= Corset =

Reinforced historical European undergarment

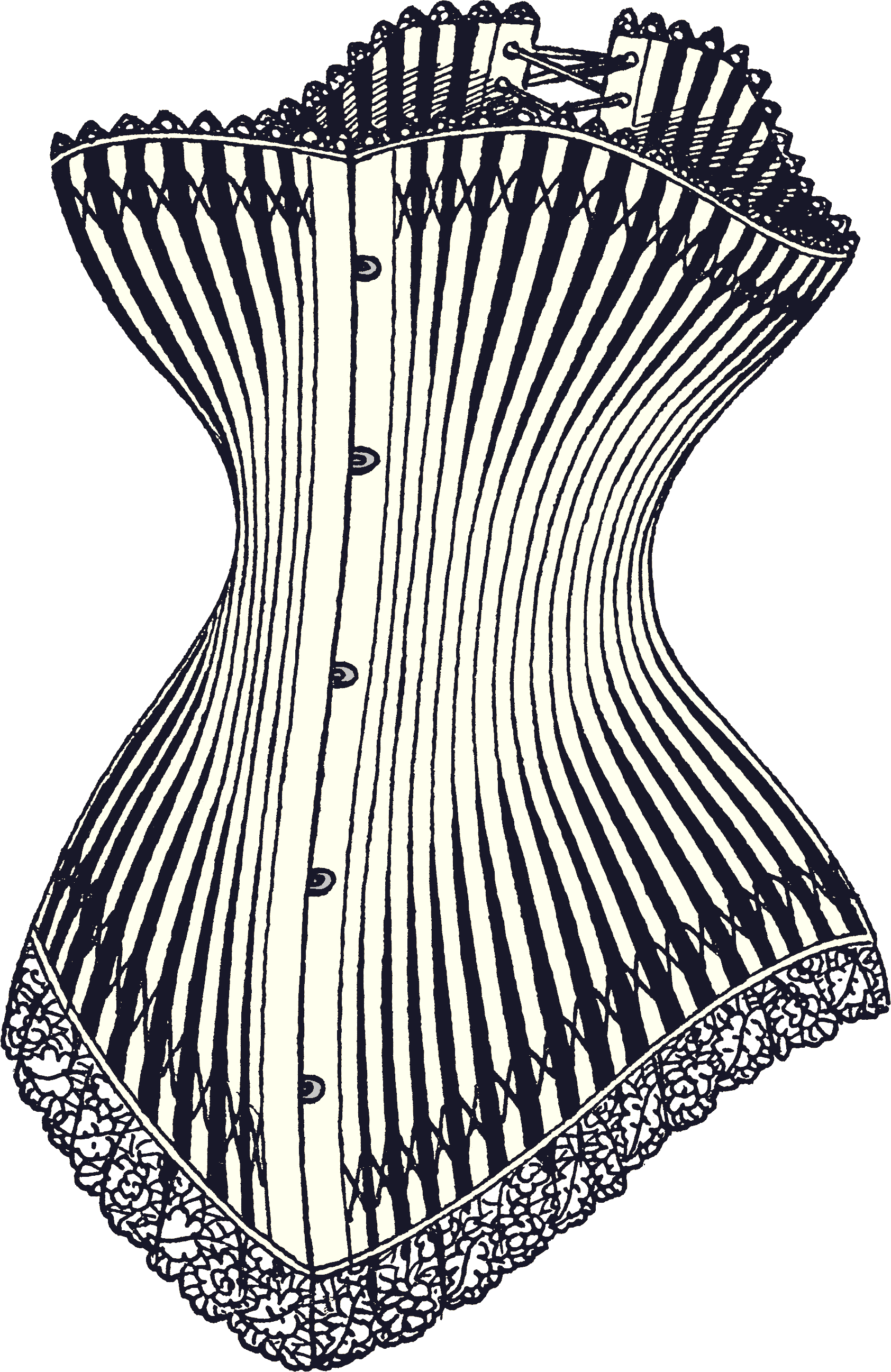
A drawing of a luxury hourglass corset from 1878, featuring a busk fastening at the front and lacing at the back

A corset (/ˈkɔːrsɪt/) is a support garment worn to constrict the torso into the desired shape and posture. They are traditionally constructed out of fabric with boning made of whalebone or steel, a stiff panel in the front called a busk which holds the torso rigidly upright, and some form of lacing which allows the garment to be tightened. Corsets, also known as stays, were an essential undergarment in European women's fashion from the 17th century to the early 20th century. In the 17th and 18th centuries they had a conical, straight-sided shape. This eventually evolved into the more curvaceous 19th century form. By the beginning of the 20th century, shifting gender roles that allowed women to be more active outside the home, as well as the onsets of World War I and II (and the associated material shortages) led the corset to be largely discarded by mainstream fashion.

Since the corset fell out of use, the fashion industry has extended the term "corset" to refer to garments which mimic the look of traditional corsets. These modern designs may feature some amount of lacing or boning, but generally have very little, if any, effect on the shape of the wearer's body. Elasticated garments, such as girdles and waist trainers, are still worn today and serve a similar purpose in shaping the waist or hips, although they lack the rigidity of corsets. A corset brace is a type of orthotic resembling a traditional corset, used to support the lower back in patients with mild to moderate back pain.

== Etymology ==
The word corset is a diminutive of the Old French word cors (meaning "body", and itself derived from the Latin corpus): the word therefore means "little body". The craft of corset construction is known as corsetry, as is the general wearing of them. (The word corsetry is sometimes also used as a collective plural form of corset). Someone who makes corsets is a corsetier or corsetière (French terms for a man and for a woman maker, respectively), or sometimes simply a corsetmaker. The garment to which the corset refers was variously referred to as (a pair of) bodies, stays, or a corset, depending on the time period. In the 18th century, the word corset came into general use in the English language.

== Uses ==
=== Fashion ===
As the form and purpose of the corset constantly evolved throughout its time as a standard undergarment, there is no way to definitively state how it was worn. While the original purpose of stiffened undergarments was to avoid creasing more costly, highly adorned outer garments, the most common and well-known use of corsets is to slim the body and make it conform to a fashionable silhouette.

==== 16th–18th centuries ====
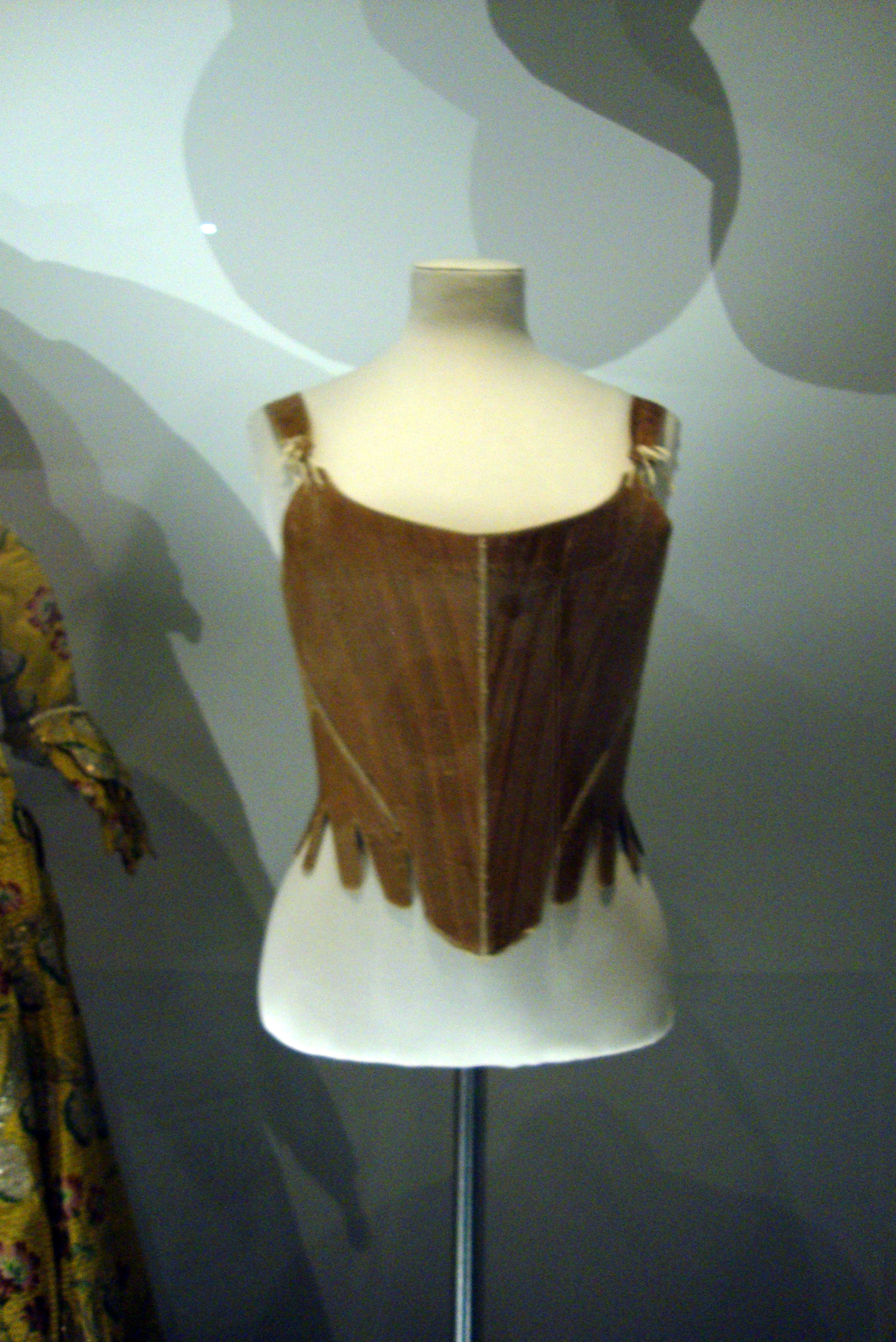
Pair of stays, c.1780s. Fashion Museum, Bath, England.

In the Tudor period, corsets, known then as "bodies", were worn to achieve a tubular straight-up-and-down shape, which involved minimizing the bust. These bodies, worn by women and men, were common into the 16th and 17th centuries and achieved their stiffened shaping with materials including steel, wood, or whalebone. They were constructed of two parts and fastened at the sides. Bodies evolved into the stays of the 17th century.

Stays shaped the body to fit the desired silhouette, which, for example, in the 1780s resembled an inverted cone shape. They an also ensured good posture and the appearance of smooth contours – the central aim of such undergarments of this period, rather than exaggerating the bust and waist. Stays were believed to prevent body deformities and were sometimes worn as outer garments by the peasant class. Women of all levels of society wore stays or jumps, from ladies of the court to street vendors. Stays were considered more respectable than jumps, as described in an anonymous aphorism dating to 1762: "Now a shape in neat stays, now a slattern in jumps;" the use of stays was associated with respectability and being above physical labor.

==== 19th century ====
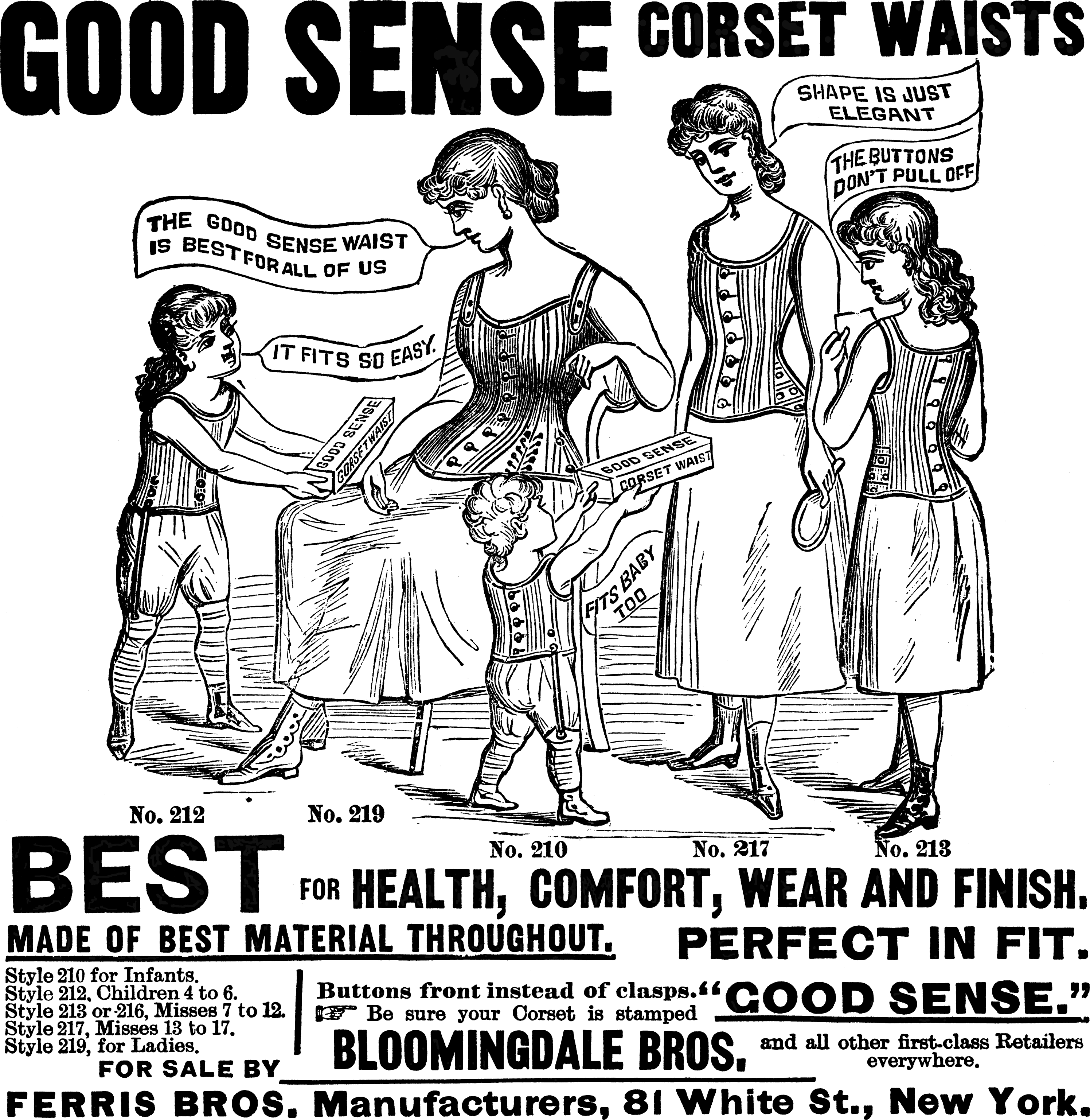
Advertisement of corsets for children, 1886

From the end of the 18th century until the 1820s, in reflection of the neoclassical style of dress, the demi-corset or short stays became popular, as the empire line of fashionable gowns did not require support or shaping to the waist. These garments ended at or just above the waist, supporting the bust without providing shaping to the rest of the torso.

After the early 1800s, the wasp waist silhouette came into vogue for women, and the advent of steel eyelets and boning allowed for stronger, more durable corsets that could create greater reductions in waist size. This period saw the creation of the curvaceous, nipped-in corsets that we most commonly associate with the term "corset" today. Corsets were a standard part of daily wear for all women in Western fashion. Forgoing a corset in public was a risqué choice and associated with prostitution.

During the 19th century, all infants generally wore some kind of stiffened waistband, and female children were transitioned to the corset at some point before or during adolescence. In some cases, mothers started their daughters wearing corsets in early childhood. The New York Times described the practice in its Fashion section in 1881:

From the time an infant wears dresses, a kind of broad belt is used, with shoulder pieces. To this, the child's undergarments are buttoned. Little girls wear these until they are about 7 years of age. From this time, the belt has rather more shape, and the back part is supported on both sides by a whalebone or a very soft steel spring. From the age of 10 to 12 years, another bone is added in the back. Corsets for young ladies have busks, narrow whalebones, and very soft steel springs. Ladies' corsets of satin or other material have jointed busks, and are drawn in over the hips, making the front of the corsets very long.

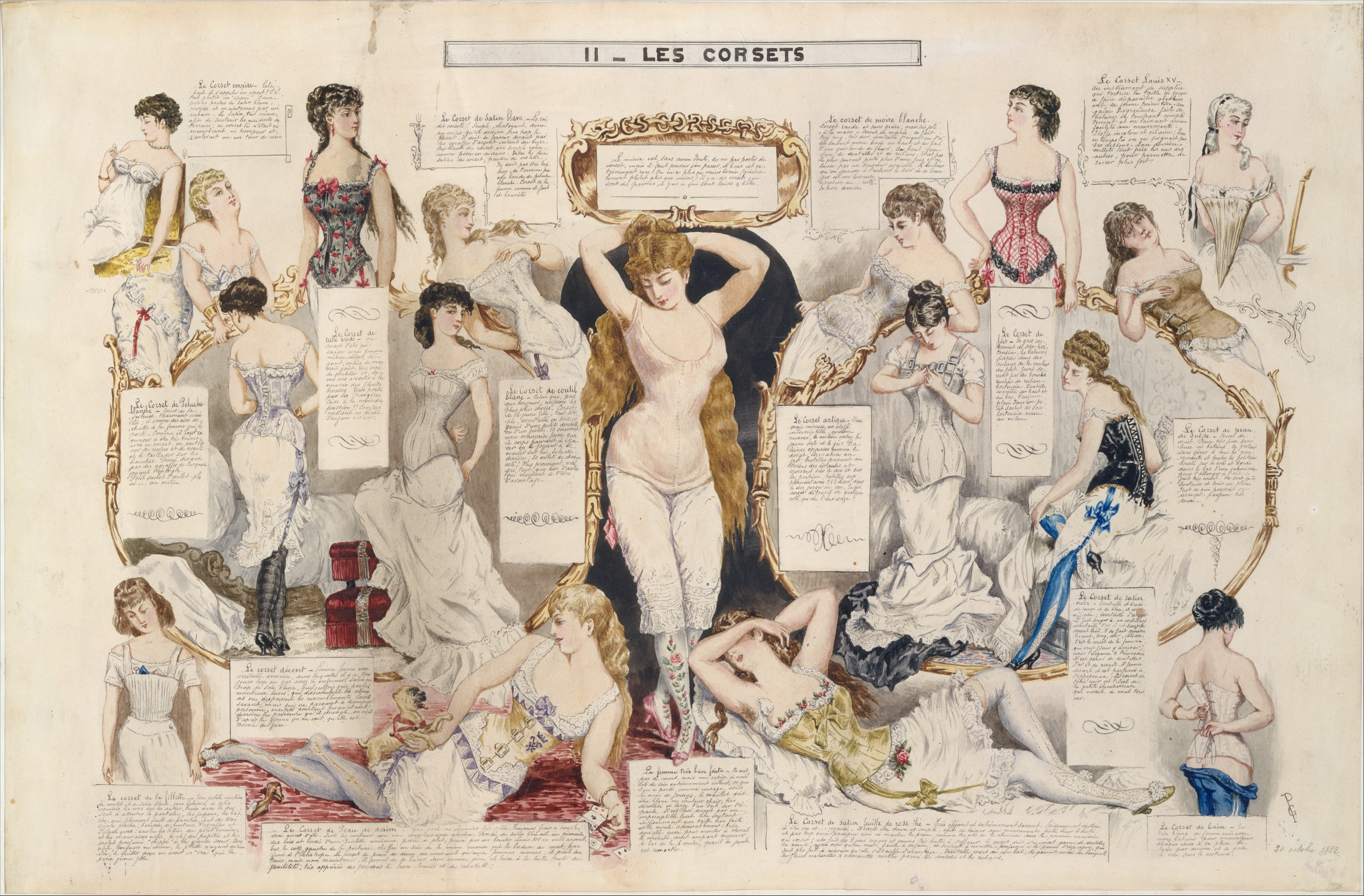
Humorous illustration of a variety of corset styles and designs published in La Vie Parisienne in 1881, including one for young girls (lower-left), one from the Regency era (upper-left), and one from the 18th century (upper-right). The caption in the gold frame reads: "The best thing is, without a doubt, not to wear a corset, but you have to be able to do without one, and that is, frankly, rare. One needs them, more or less (generally more than less); some corsets are beautiful, some are ugly and stupid."

An "overbust corset" encloses the torso, extending from just under the arms toward the hips. An "underbust corset" begins just under the breasts and extends down toward the hips. A "longline corset"—either overbust or underbust—extends past the iliac crest, or the hip bone. A longline corset creates the appearance of a longer torso and narrower hips. This style was common during the 1910s, when slim hips came into vogue, and later evolved into the elasticated girdle. A "standard" length corset stops short of the iliac crest. Some corsets, in very rare instances, reach the knees. A shorter kind of corset that covers the waist area (from low on the ribs to just above the hips), is called a waist cincher. A corset may also include garters to hold up stockings; alternatively, a separate garter belt may be worn. A corset supports the visible dress and distributes the weight of large structural garments, such as petticoats, crinolines, and bustles. Corsets were worn under or over petticoats, crinolines, and other structural garments, depending on the time period and the wearer.

==== Men's corsets ====
In the 1820s, some men began to wear corsets, due to the beauty standard of men having a very thin waist. This was associated with dandies, along with garments such as the redingote, which sometimes featured padding to emphasize the waist even more. Men wearing corsets was also associated with the military and some forms of sport, due to their ability to support the back. Men's corsets primarily served to slim the waist and were worn over the shirt but beneath the trousers, vest, and jacket. The practice was controversial, along with dandies in general. By the mid-1800s onward, men's corsets fell out of favor, and were generally considered effeminate and pretentious.

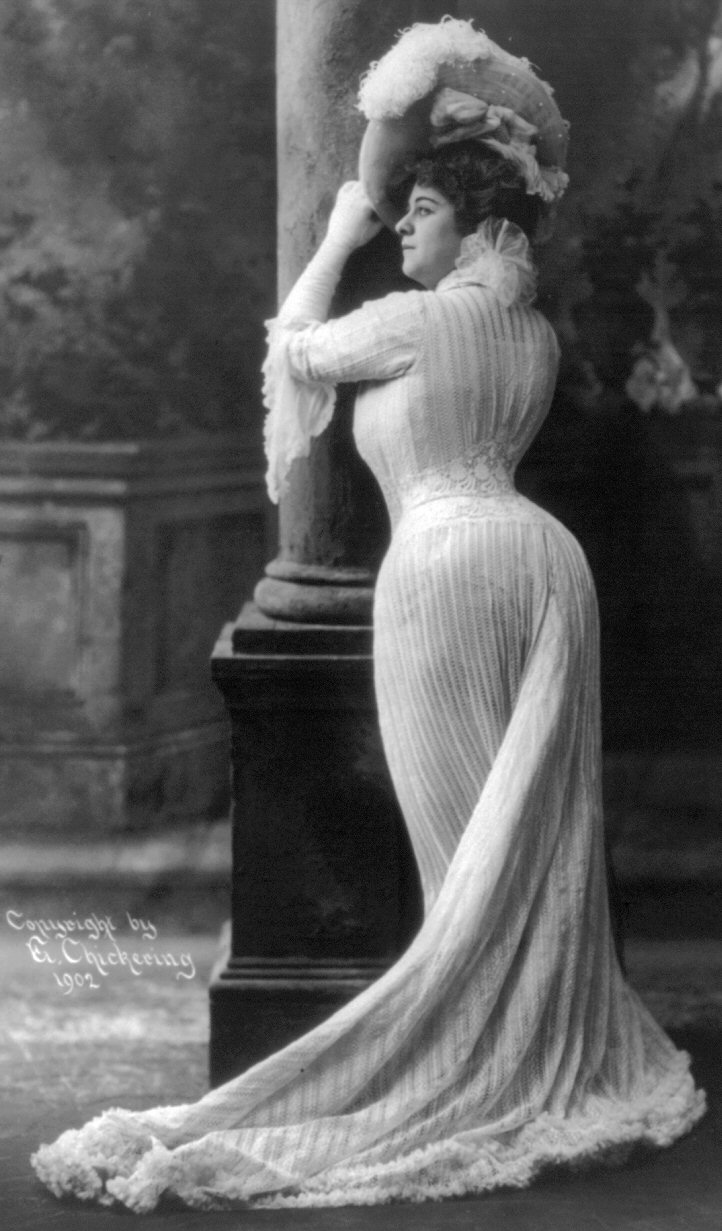
Actress Bianca Lyons shows the exaggerated female curves achieved by corsets and padding, c. 1902

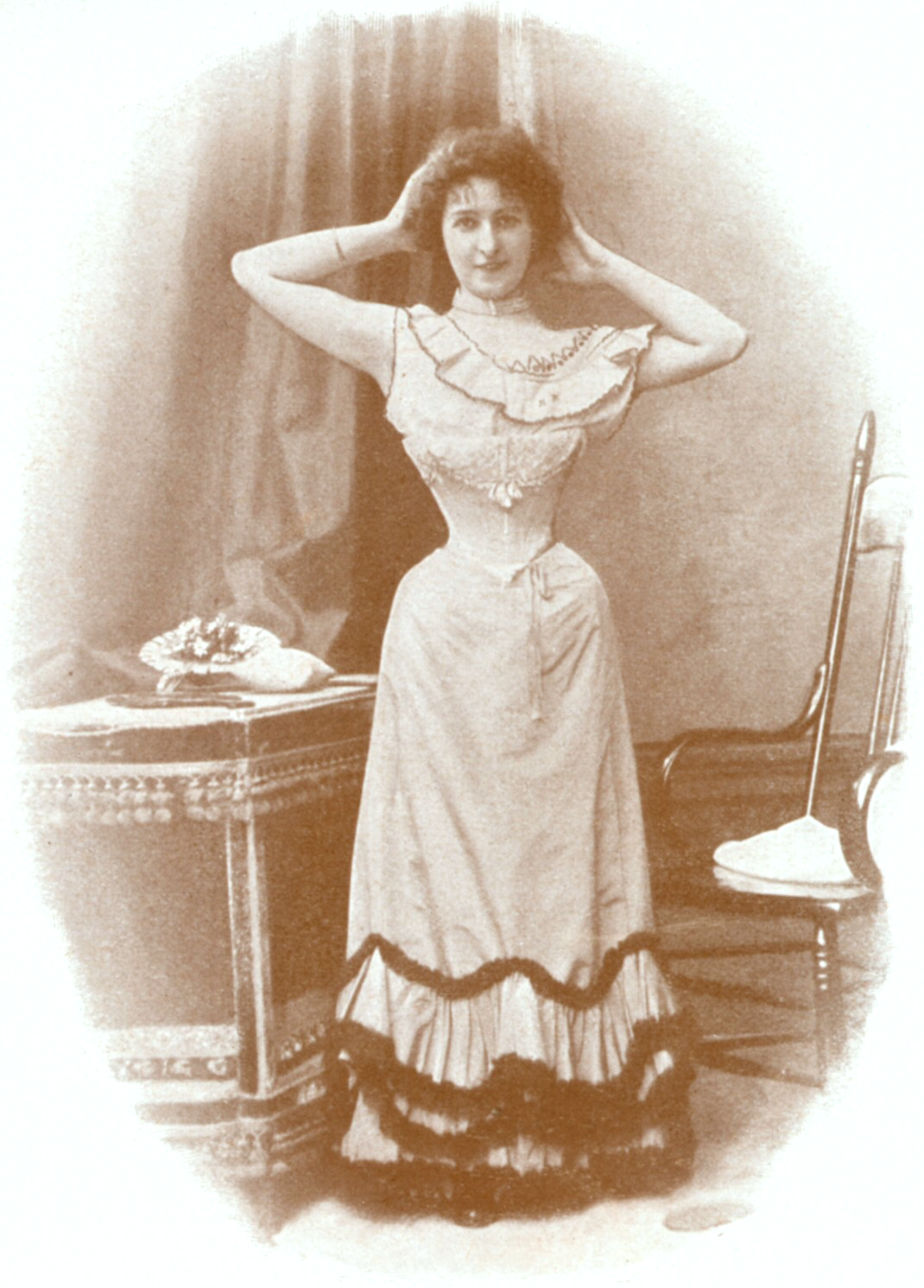
A woman models a corset in 1898

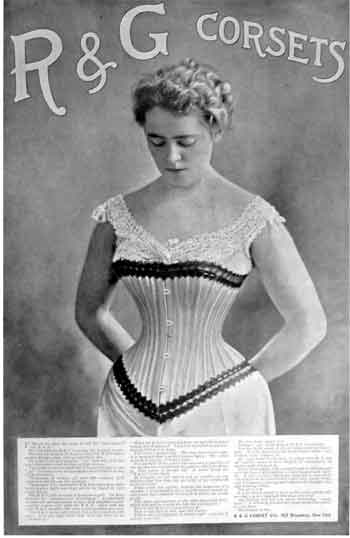
An award-winning advert from the back cover of the October 1898 Ladies' Home Journal

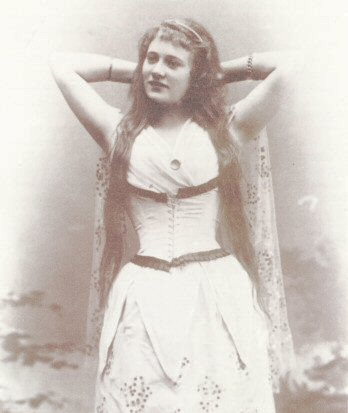
Amanda Nielsen in a corset

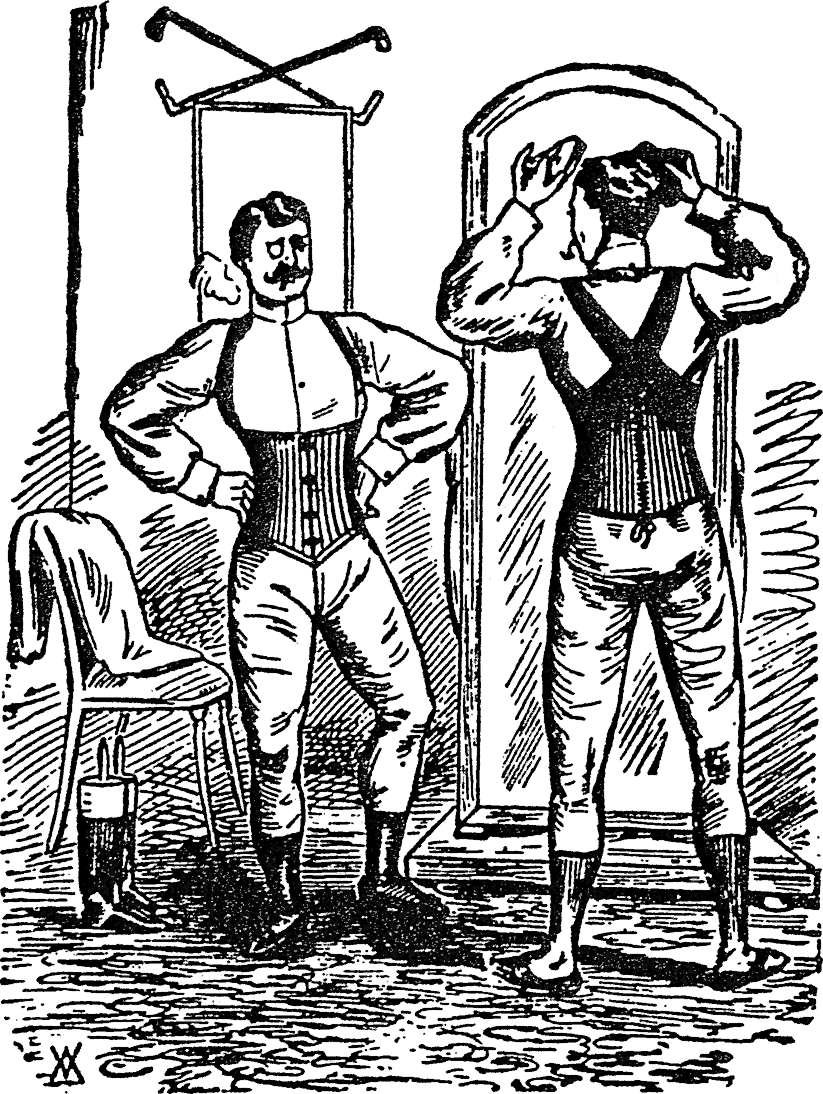
1893 advertisement of corsets for men

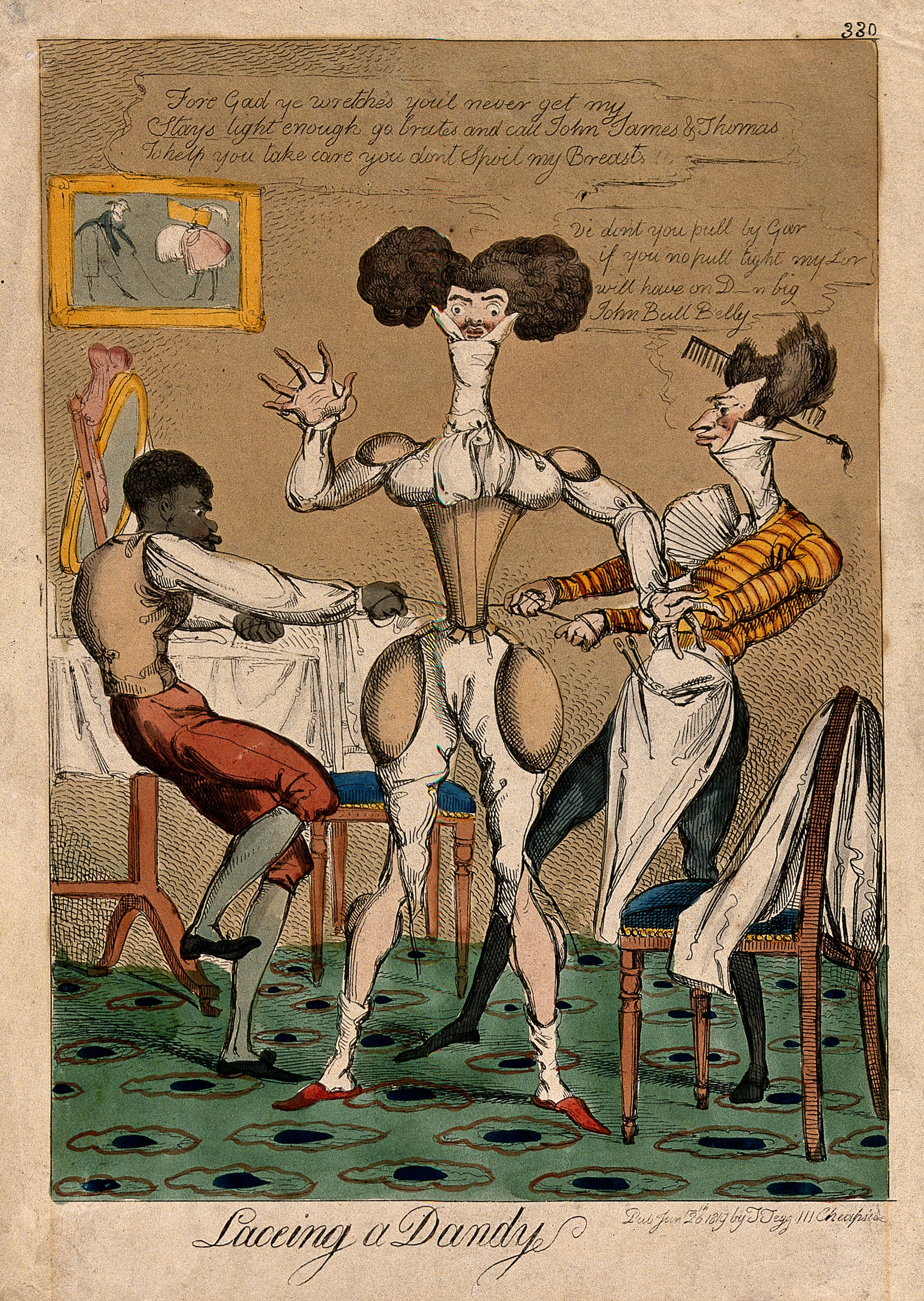
"Lacing a Dandy," a satirical cartoon of a man being laced into a corset, 1819

==== Support garments for the corset ====
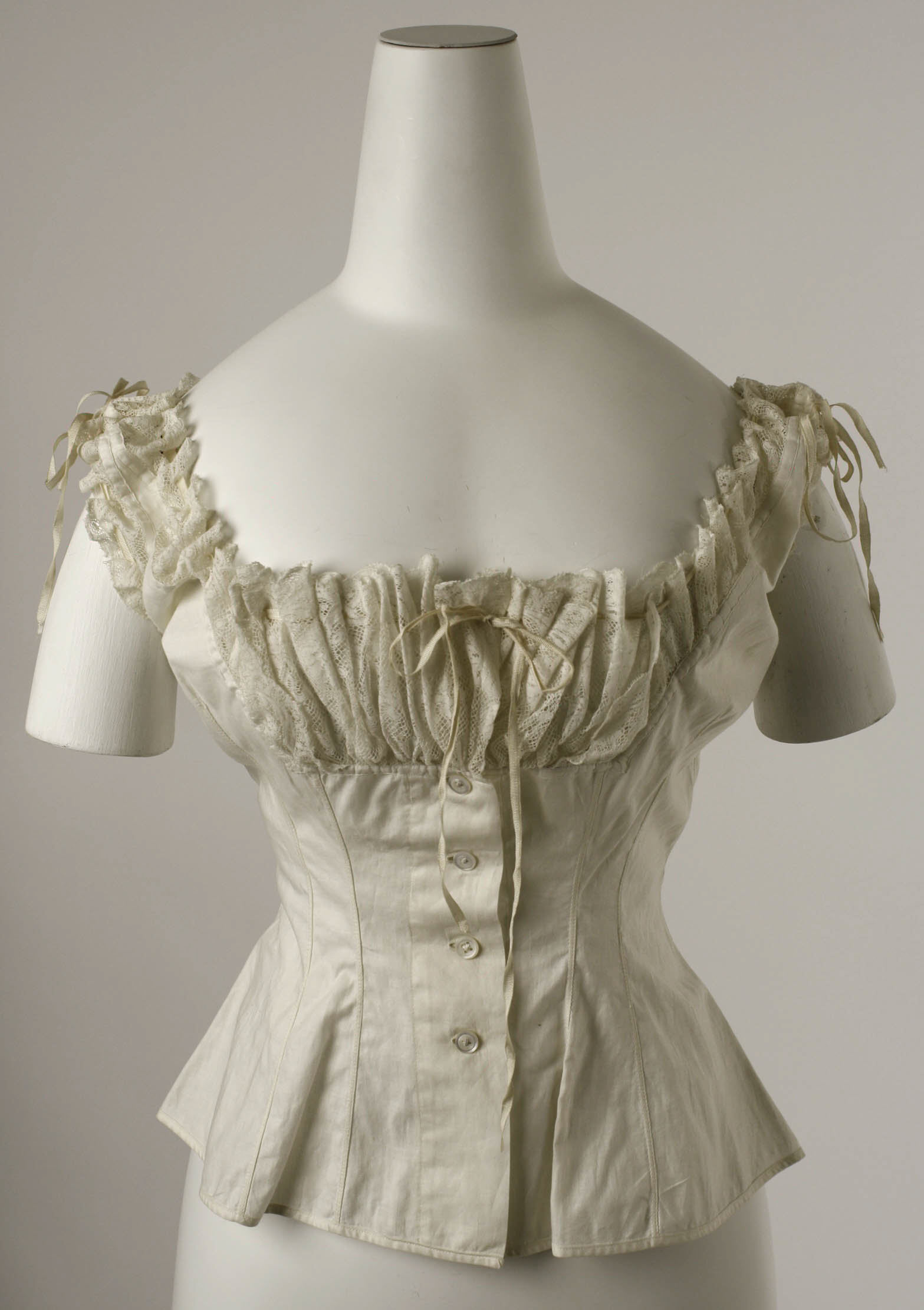
A cotton corset cover from 1887.

Typically the corset was worn over light cotton underwear like a chemise, which was a thin cotton dress, or a combination, which combined the chemise and drawers into one garment. This served to absorb sweat and protect the corset and wearer from each other, and also to function as underwear and protect other garments from the wearer and their sweat. This is in part due to difficulties laundering these items: laundering would reduce the lifespan of an otherwise long-lasting garment and, during the 19th century, the steel boning and metal eyelets could rust if washed regularly. The other primary purpose of the chemise is to prevent chafing from the stiff, sometimes coarse materials used in corsets.

Beginning in the 1840s, corset covers were sometimes used. These served to protect outer clothes from the corset, to protect the corset from being damaged by boning in outer garments, to protect garments from sweat, to smooth the lines of the corset, and for modesty. The corset cover could help to avoid revealing the corset when wearing a dress with a low neckline. The corset cover was generally in the form of a light chemisette, made from cotton lawn or silk. Modern corset wearers may wear corset covers for many of the same reasons.

=== Fetish ===
Aside from fashion and medical uses, corsets are also used in sexual fetishism, most notably in Bondage/Discipline/Sado-Masochism (BDSM). In BDSM, a submissive may be required to wear a corset, which would be laced very tightly and restrict the wearer to some degree. A dominant may also wear a corset, often black, but for entirely different reasons, such as aesthetics. A specially designed corset, in which the breasts and vulva are exposed, can be worn during "vanilla sex" or BDSM activities. Dress historian David Kunzle argues in his work Fashion and Fetishism that historical usage of the corset had a fetishistic dimension as some wearers reported feeling sexual pleasure from the use of the garment, and the corseted waist was highly sexualized by men and women alike.

=== Medical ===
A corset brace is a lumbar support that is used in the prevention and treatment of lower-back pain. They can also be prescribed to patients healing from spinal surgery. A corset brace resembles a historical corset, but is typically made with elastic fabric and plastic boning to allow for more flexibility. Metal boning may be used if more rigidity is needed. Artist Andy Warhol was shot in 1968 and never fully recovered; he wore a corset for the rest of his life. Historically, metal corsets have been used by doctors to correct issues with posture.

== Construction ==
Corsets are typically constructed of a sturdy, nonstretch material, often cotton, with coutil being a popular choice historically. Other materials sometimes used included silk, wool, or leather. Structure is provided by boning (also called ribs or stays) inserted into channels in the cloth or leather. In the 18th and early 19th century, thin strips of baleen (also known as whalebone) were favoured for the boning, while steel boning was more common in the mid to late 19th century. Spring and/or spiral steel boning or synthetic whalebone (plastic boning specifically designed for corsetry) are the preferred materials for higher quality modern corsets. Plastic is commonly used for modern fashion corsets. Other materials used for boning have included ivory, wood, and cane. The front of the corset is supported by a stiff, flat piece along the sternum called the busk which creates a smooth line in the front, usually made of wood or metal.

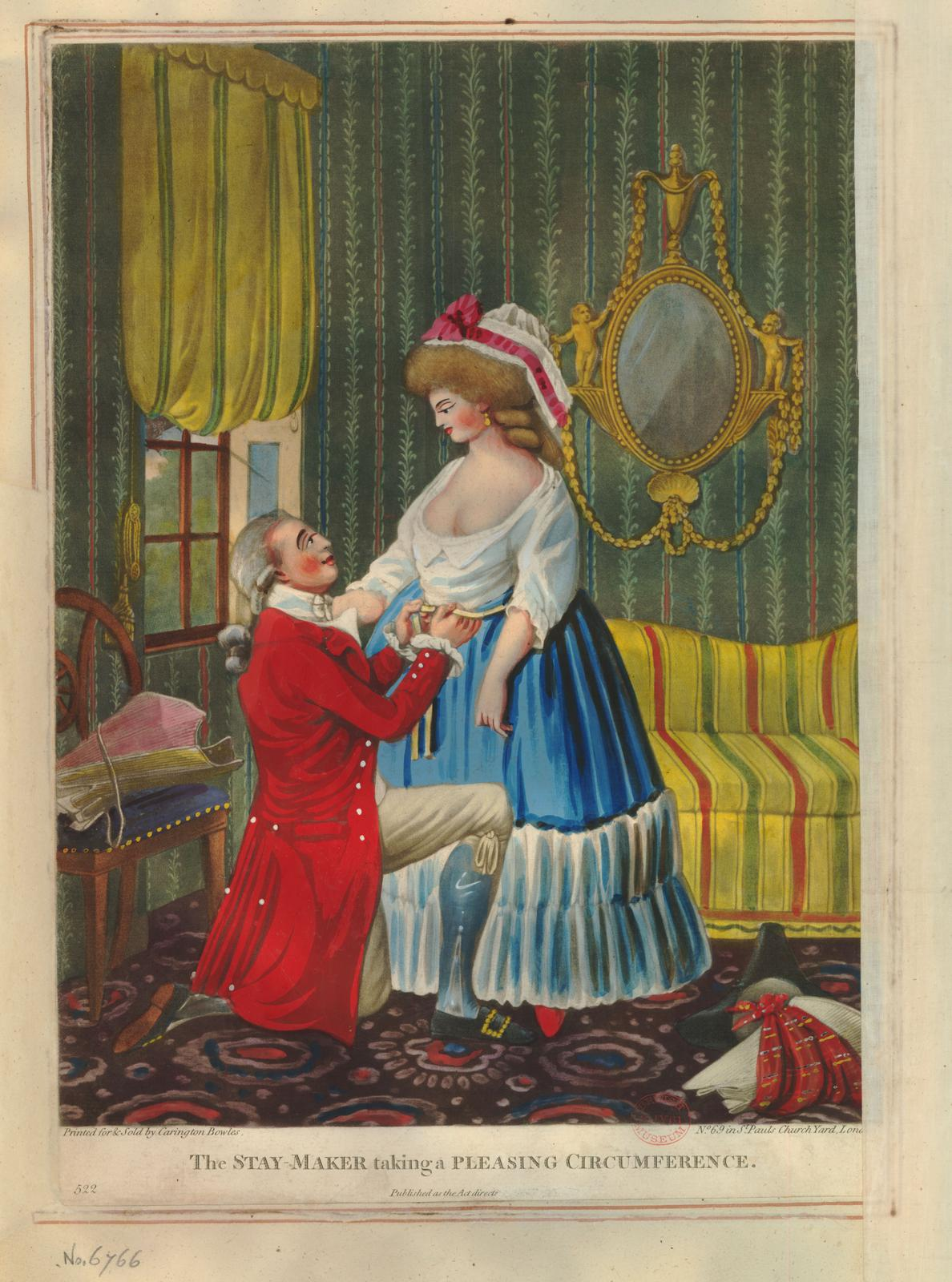
"The Stay-Maker taking a pleasing circumference," 1784 illustration

Corsets are held together by lacing, typically on the back of the garment. Tightening or loosening the lacing produces corresponding changes in the level of compression of the corset. Depending on the desired effect and time period, corsets can be laced from the top down, from the bottom up, or both up from the bottom and down from the top, using the bunny ears lacing method. In the Victorian era, the center-front split busk was developed, which allowed the corset to be buttoned or hooked in the front. This allowed corsets to be more easily worn and removed by the wearer, even if she did not have help at hand to loosen or tighten the laces. If the corset was worn loosely, it was possible to leave the lacing as adjusted and take the corset on and off using the front opening. (If the corset is worn snugly, this method will damage the busk if the lacing is not significantly loosened beforehand). Spoon busks were developed in the 1870s and serve to shape the stomach to create a more fashionable rounded look, preventing the rigid bottom of the corset from jutting out, as well as distributing the pressure from the corset.

=== Manufacture and design ===
In the 1660s, the manufacture of stays, as they were known during the period, began to emerge as its own profession in France. These craftsmen were known as staymakers. The work was specialized and generally considered men's work, although women often assisted in the construction process sewing together pieces cut and fitted by men. Women were excluded from staymaker's guilds, and the work was considered too strenuous for women to do correctly.

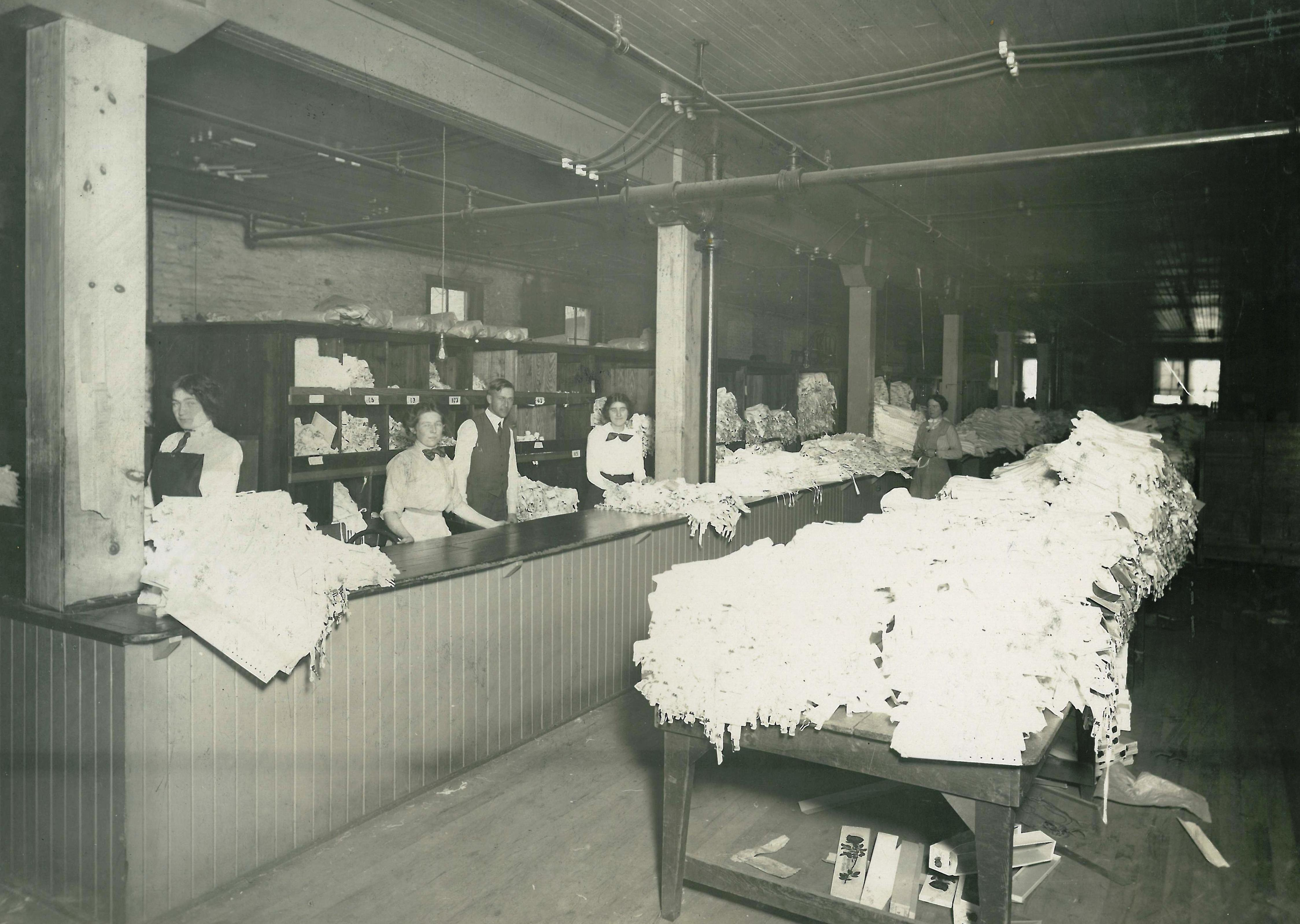
A workspace at Kalamazoo Corset Company, 1912, after a historic strike which unsuccessfully protested low wages, long hours, unsanitary working conditions, and sexual harassment in the workplace.

By the 19th century, corsets became one of the first garments to be manufactured in factories via assembly line. Each step was performed by a different group of people, often children. Heavy or messy work was done in house, such as cutting the fabric pieces and japanning the steels to prevent rust, and lighter work, such as sewing the bones in place, was taken home by piece workers, generally women who enlisted their children to help them. Workers in corset factories were among the most poorly-paid in London, and frequently could not make enough to meet their daily living expenses. The advent of the sewing machine as well as the use of assembly-line manufacturing allowed manufacturers to offer a larger variety of corsets in different colors. Steam-moulding, developed in the late 1860s, created stiffer and more rounded corsets.

Although the corsetmaking industry was dominated by men, a number of woman designers and inventors became known for their work in this field. Among them included Roxey Ann Caplin, who consulted her physician husband to create corsets with respect to modern knowledge of female anatomy. The field of corsetmaking was one in which new designs were continually submitted and patented, often with the desire to create ever stronger or stiffer corsets that were less likely to break.

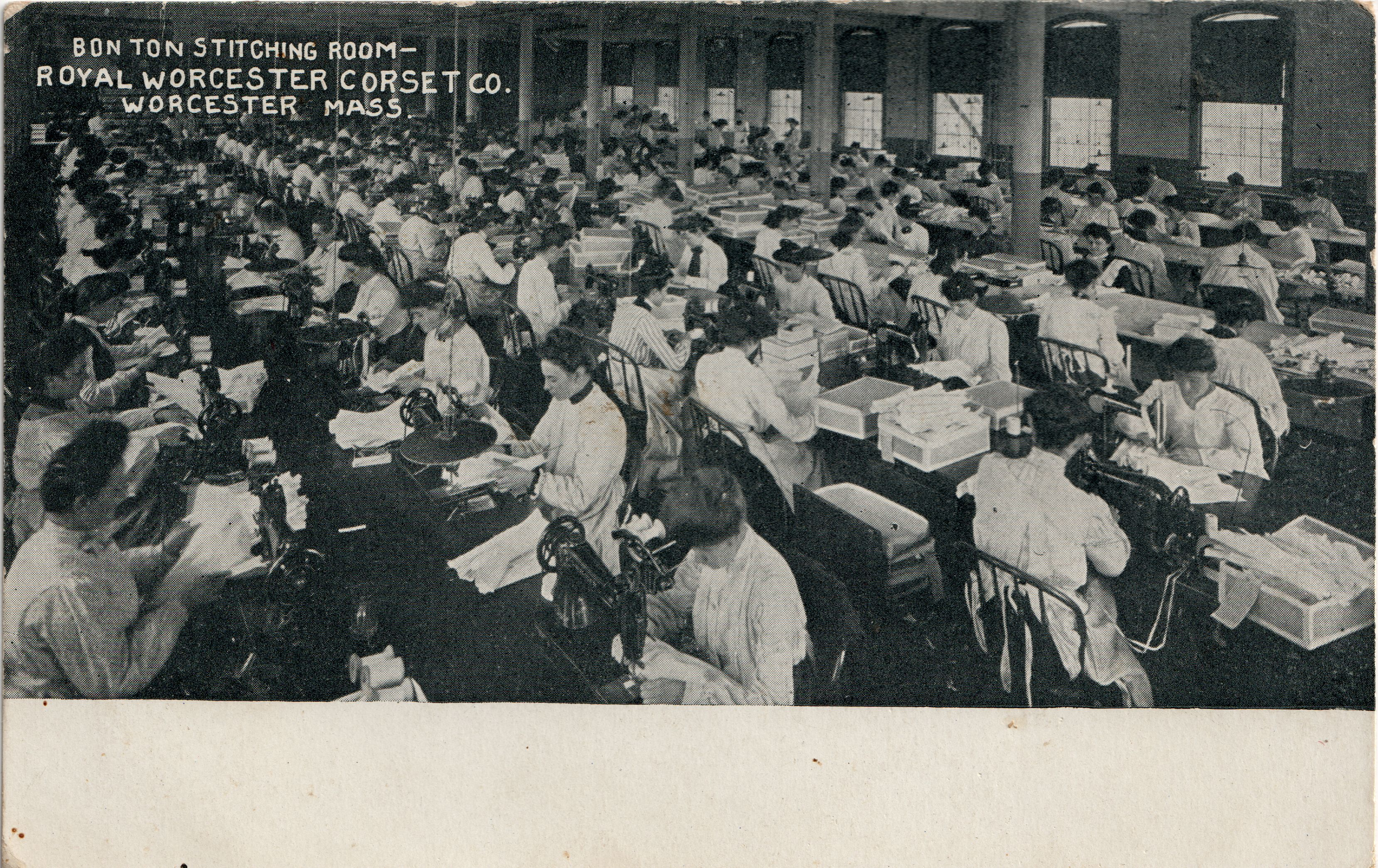
Women making corsets for the Royal Worcester Corset Company of Massachusetts, circa 1910s or 1920s

== Waist reduction ==
Prior to the invention of the steel eyelet in 1827, the corset primarily served to smooth the lines of the torso and support the posture. Steel eyelets as well as steel boning and busks allowed wearers to lace their corsets significantly more tightly without damaging the garment, and created the wasp-waisted shape now associated with the corset. Nineteenth century writing on female beauty emphasized the importance of a small, round waist, an exaggeration of the difference between the male and female figure. The corset was the primary tool used to achieve this figure, along with padding in the skirt such as petticoats and bustles. Periods where skirt fashions were larger and more voluminous typically corresponded with larger-waisted, less dramatic corsets, as less reduction was needed to achieve the hourglass effect; the opposite was true during periods with smaller skirt volumes.

Dress historians estimate that the average corseted waist size of the 1880s was approximately 53 centimetres (21 in), with an uncorseted waist size of about 69 centimetres (27 in). Extreme reduction - tightlacing - was largely the domain of middle to lower-middle-class women hoping to increase their station in life, although the amount of reduction that constituted "tightlacing" is not precisely defined. However, the range of typical waist reduction likely ranged from 5.1–15.2 centimetres (2–6 in). Corset advertisements typically listed sizes ranging from 46 to 76 centimetres (18 to 30 in) closed (which would have been worn with 2.5–7.6 centimetres (1–3 in) of open lacing). Beauty writer Arnold Cooley complained that that while natural waist sizes were generally around 71 to 74 centimetres (28 to 29 in), most women did not allow themselves to exceed 61 centimetres (24 in), and that sizes of 56–51 centimetres (22–20 in) were seen in "deluded victims of fashion and vanity." Statistics from 1888 indicate that the average waist size had decreased over the past 25 years, attributed to tightlacing itself as well as the lowered respiration and food intake permitted by corset usage.

Modern wearers are unlikely to achieve the same degree of reduction that was recorded in historical usage. During the eighteenth and nineteenth centuries, corset training was usually begun during adolescence or even before. The slimmest waist sizes on record should be contextualized with the fact that they were seen in teenage girls, and were likely to have been reserved for special occasions such as dances.

Until 1998, the Guinness Book of World Records listed Ethel Granger as having the smallest waist on record at 33 centimetres (13 in). After 1998, the category changed to "smallest waist on a living person." Cathie Jung took the title with a waist measuring 38 centimetres (15 in). Other women, such as Polaire, also have achieved such reductions: 41 centimetres (16 in) in her case. Empress Sisi of Austria was known to have a very slender waist at 41 centimetres (16 in).

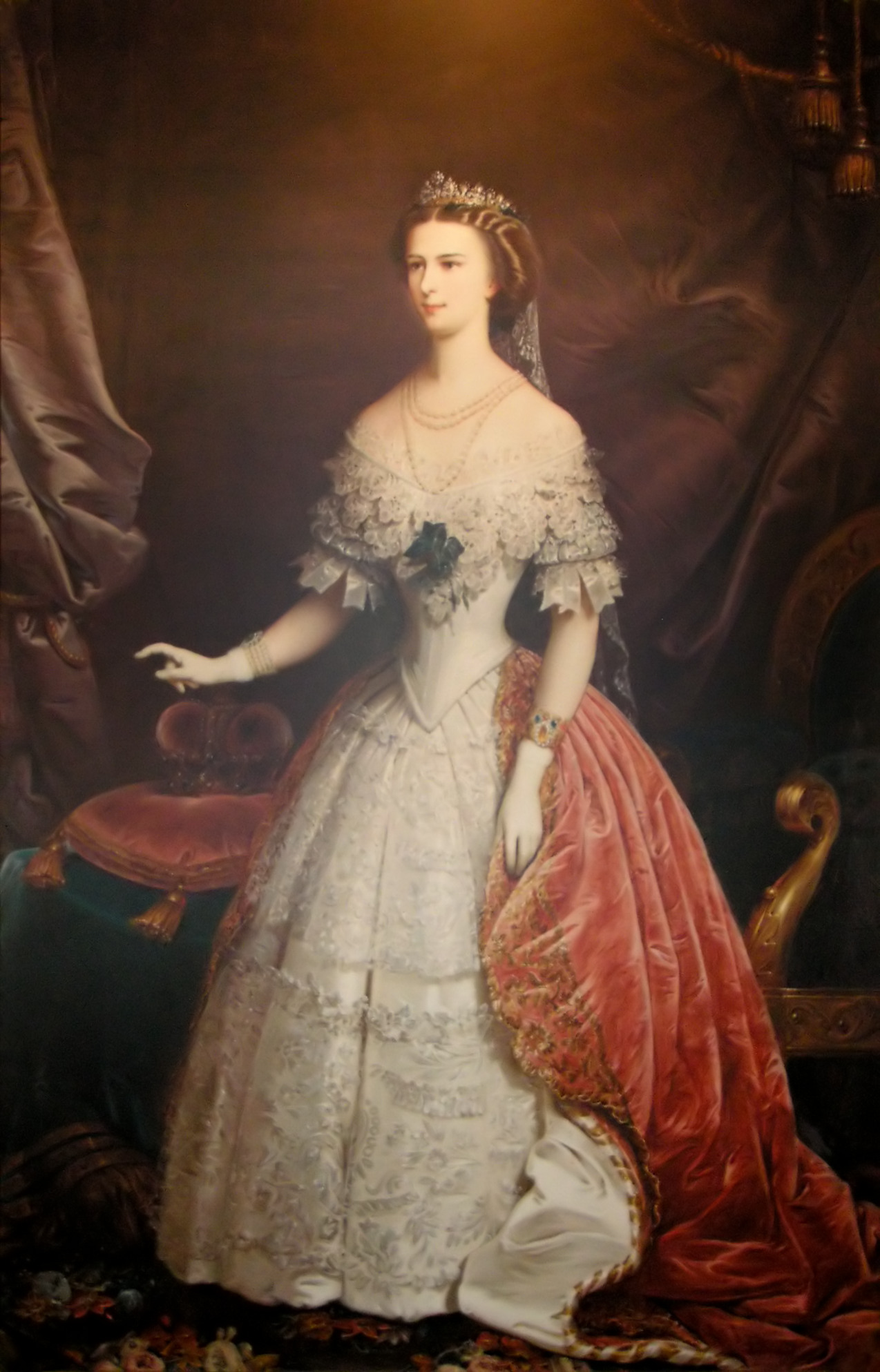
Empress Elisabeth of Austria, nicknamed Sisi, was known for her waist measuring 41 centimetres (16 in)

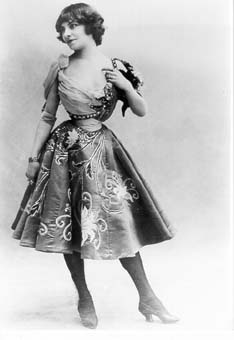
Polaire, a French actress known for her waist of 41 centimetres (16 in)

== Health effects ==
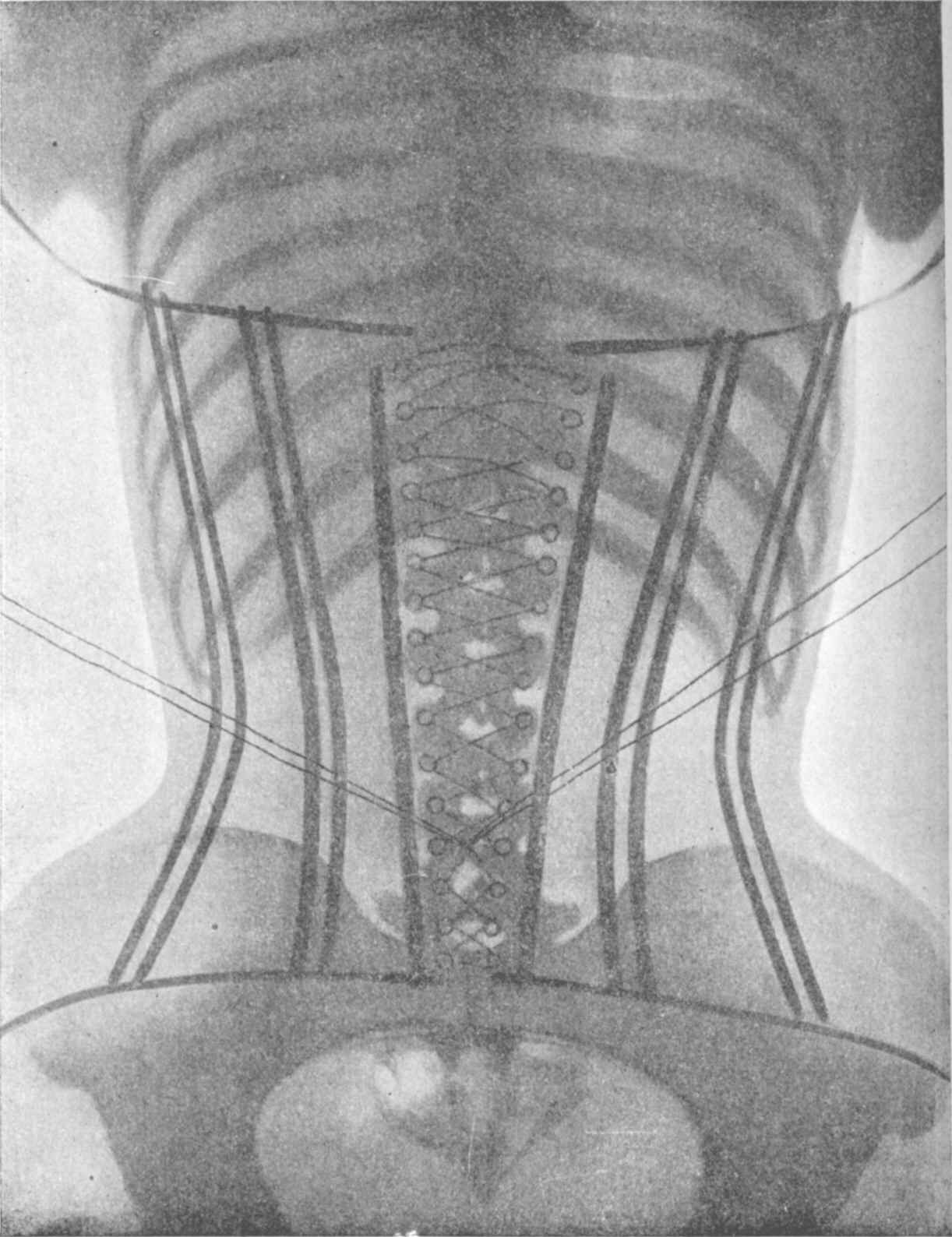
X-ray of a woman in a corset

The negative physical effects of corseting have become widely spoken about, including a variety of myths. For example, the idea that Victorian women frequently underwent rib removal to achieve a smaller waist is baseless. However, wearing a corset does affect a number of bodily functions and can be deleterious to the wearer's health, especially when worn regularly over a long period of time; during the Victorian era stays were typically begun at or before the onset of puberty, with reported ages ranging from 7 to 13.

=== Comfort ===
The comfort of corsets is hugely variable. Similar to shoes, new or ill-fitting corsets are not comfortable, and different styles of corsets had different impacts on their wearers. Modern actresses in period dramas have often voiced their struggles with uncomfortable and restrictive corsets. In the 18th century, some writers regarded stays as being uncomfortable, even "nearly purgatory", but discomfort was seen as secondary to the outcome of fashionable dress. A greater deal of discussion on the comfort of corsets comes later in the 19th century with advancements in technology creating the small waists associated with corsetry today. Again, reports varied widely, with some extolling the beauty of tighter corsets, others praising the supportive value of loosely laced corsets, and others condemning the wearing of corsets altogether. Generally, women wore a lightly boned, loosely tightened corsets in the morning or when doing household tasks, taking exercise, or traveling; slightly tighter corsets for casual social occasions like shopping, tea, or visiting; and the tightest lacing would be reserved for formal occasions such as balls. Advertisements for new models of corsets frequently emphasized the comfort of their product.

The experiences of historic reenactors can, to some extent, give insight into the experience of wearing corsets. Sarah Bendall, a material culture and fashion historian, “likens the pain to either being equal or less than the discomfort you get from a typical bra with its underwire and straps”, when describing her experience of wearing reproduction corsetry. An experiment with historic reenactors into the impact of corset-wearing found that subjects reported a significant impact on comfort with reduction beyond 7.6 centimetres (3 in) (about 10% of the waistline), which aligns with modern estimates of historical usages; some reported issues with shallow breathing or lower back pressure. Late-19th century S-bend corsets were reported to cause a greater impact than the curved-front mid-19th century style.

=== Respiration ===
Moderately laced corsets have been demonstrated to reduce lung capacity anywhere from 2 to 29%, with an average of 9%, and can cause an increase in shortness of breath during moderate exercise such as dancing. In a study of 16 subjects, those with smaller-than-average (<83 centimetres (32.5 in)) waists were found to experience a greater reduction of lung capacity, but those with above-average waist sizes had more difficulty recovering to their initial lung capacity after the corset was removed; this replicated the results of historical studies. Based on such studies as well as modern accounts of corset usage, accounts of fainting due to corset usage are thought to be credible. Dances were often a reason to lace a corset unusually tight, which combined with exercise could lead to shortness of breath.

Doctors warned corseted women against "everything that [was] worthy of the name exercise" to avoid strain, although some guides were written on light calisthenics to be done by young women who would presumably be wearing corsets. Typical exercises included stretching, dance steps, and skipping, largely focusing on moving the limbs and balancing. As women's social freedom increased during the second half of the 19th century, sport corsets began to be sold, designed for wear while bicycling, playing tennis, or horseback riding. These designs typically incorporated some form of elastic panelling or mesh. In a treadmill exercise test, corseted subjects from the historical reenactment community were found to have a significantly higher respiration rates and heart rates after exercise, particularly those wearing a 1900s-style straight-front corset, although both styles impacted the wearers.

Corsets were widely thought to contribute to tuberculosis. Prior to the advent of germ theory, some thought corsets directly caused the disease, as women were significantly more likely to contract and die from the disease than men in this era. Others thought corsets contributed to TB deaths due to impairment of lung function.

=== Muscular wasting ===
Corsets are known to contribute significantly to muscle wasting in the core and back when worn over long periods of time. Although they temporarily relieve back pain, muscle atrophy due to disuse will lead to increased lower-back pain and eventually reliance on the corset to stand upright without pain. Forceps delivery was standard during this period, which could be due to atrophy of the abdominal muscles caused by lifelong corset usage.

=== Skeletal deformities ===
Skeletal analyses have found that the usage of corsets had a significant effect on the form of the spine, ribs, and hips. This change was permanent when the corset was used in early childhood and adolescence; modern wearers who begin usage in adulthood may see some temporary changes. The consequences of this change are not fully agreed upon by researchers. Underdevelopment of the pelvic inlet may have contributed to difficulties in birth.

=== Pelvic floor and reproductive health ===
A significant source of the controversy surrounding corsets was their ability to affect the reproductive system due to the downward pressure created by displacement of organs. One Doctor Lewis writes in an 1882 edition of The North American Review:

A girl who has indulged in tight lacing should not marry. She may be a very devoted wife, yet her husband will secretly regret his marriage. Physicians of experience know what is meant, while thousands of husbands will not only know, but deeply feel the meaning of this hint.

This quote alludes to problems with the reproductive organs experienced by women who tightlaced, and demonstrates the difficulties of explaining this issue due to Victorian taboos around discussing sexuality. Reformist and activist Catharine Beecher was one of the few to defy propriety norms and discuss in any detail the gynecological issues resulting from lifelong corset usage, in particular uterine prolapse. Corsets were usually worn during pregnancy, often as long as possible, to suppress and disguise the appearance of the growing fetus. Obstetrician and writer Alice Bunker Stockham campaigned against the widespread practice of wearing corsets during pregnancy, writing sardonically: "The corset should not be worn for two hundred years before pregnancy." Feminist historian Leigh Summers theorized that some of the moral panic came from the common but unspeakable idea that tightlacing could be used to induce an abortion. Doctors often attributed the difficult births many Victorian women experienced to corsets, widely believing that "primitive" women who wore less restrictive garments had less painful births and were overall healthier and more vigorous.

Modern skeletal analyses indicate that corseting, particularly during pre-puberty (most girls began in early or pre-adolescence), led to underdevelopment of the pelvic inlet, which is consistent with reported difficulties in birth, although studies into this topic have been mixed. Surgery Professor Arthur Cleland of Glasgow reported that it was common, upon autopsy, to find atrophied ovaries in women who were upper class, shop assistants, or household servants, but not in those considered "rough" working class.

==== Prolapse ====
Uterine prolapse was a condition likely exacerbated by regular corset usage. Both rectal and uterine prolapse occurred at a higher incidence during the Victorian era than today, with occurrences declining as the corset fell out of fashion. An 1888 doctor reported that “uterine derangement had increased fifty percent within the last fifteen years as a result of tight clothing, corsets and high heels." This era saw the development of a number of pessaries and other devices patented to support the prolapsed uterus, the insertion of which frequently led to further complications; the topic was a subject of wide professional discussion among gynecologists.

=== Miscellaneous ===
Corset wearing is known to decrease the size of the stomach and constrict intestinal motility, potentially leading to constipation or indigestion. The downward pressure on the pelvic floor can also lead to urinary incontinence, similar to that experienced during pregnancy. Contemporary gynecologist Dr. Howard Kelly noted in his 1909 work Medical Gynaecology that the ligaments and muscles involved with urination in corseted subjects were insufficient to maintain continence, which may have led to frequent urinary tract infections. Friction and pressure from the corset may also cause abrasions or bruising of the skin. The pressure exerted by a corset may have also negatively affected kidney function, potentially contributing to hypertension. The displacement of fat caused by a corset may lead to distension in the lower abdomen that persists when the corset is removed, an effect that can be exacerbated by the muscular weakness caused by corset usage.

Chlorosis is a now-outdated term which referred to a disease thought to be caused directly by corsets, the symptoms of which correspond to what is now called hypochromic anemia. The illness, also known as green sickness, was associated with the onset of menarche and fell under the umbrella of "female complaints": problems attributed to the increasing demands that puberty brought onto the frail female body. The physician Frederick Parkes Weber posited that the disease may have been caused by corset wearing, noting that the illness never appeared in boys, that fat rather than thin girls were more likely to experience it, and that prolonged bed rest seemed to resolve the symptoms, while trips to the sea (during which corsets would still be worn) did not.

== History ==
For nearly 500 years, bodies, stays, or corsets with boning made of reeds, whalebone, or metal were a standard part of European women's fashion. Researchers have found evidence of the use of corsets in the Minoan civilization of early Crete.

=== 16th and 17th centuries ===
In the late 16th century, what would later be known as the corset was called "a pair of bodys." It consisted of a simple bodice, stiffened with boning of reed or whalebone. A busk made of wood, horn, whalebone, metal, or ivory further reinforced the central front and created an upright posture. It was most often laced in the back, and was, at first, a garment reserved for the aristocracy. Later, the term "pair of bodies" would be replaced with the term "stays" and was generally used during the 17th and 18th centuries. Stays shaped the upper torso into a cone or cylinder shape. In the 17th century, tabs (called "fingers") at the waist were added.

=== 18th century ===
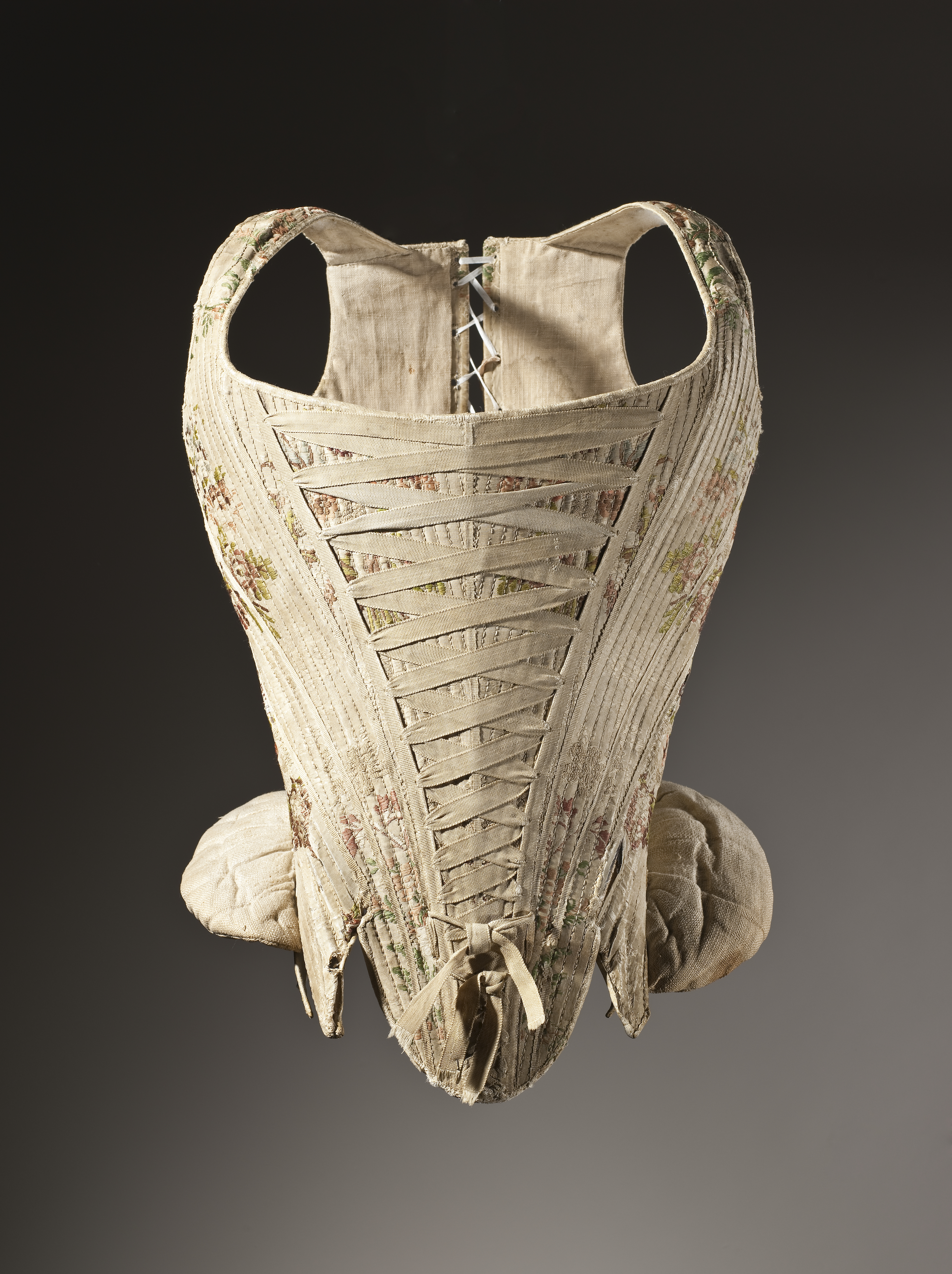
Woman's corset (stays) c. 1730–1740. Silk plain weave with supplementary weft-float patterning, stiffened with baleen; Los Angeles County Museum of Art, M.63.24.5.

Stays evolved in the 18th century, during which whalebone was used more, and increased boning was used in the garment. The shape of the stays changed as well. While they were low and wide in the front, they could reach as high as the upper shoulder in the back. Stays could be strapless or use shoulder straps. The straps of the stays were generally attached in the back and tied at the front.

The purpose of 18th century stays was to support the bust and confer the fashionable conical torso shape, while drawing the shoulders back. At that time, the eyelets were reinforced with stitches and were not placed across from one another, but staggered. That allowed the stays to be spiral laced. One end of the stay lace was inserted into the bottom eyelet and knotted, and the other end was wound through the eyelets of the stays and tightened on the top. "Jumps" were a variant of stays, which were looser, had no boning, and sometimes had attached sleeves, like a jacket.

Corsets were originally quilted waistcoats, which French women wore as an alternative to stiff stays. They were only quilted linen, laced in the front, and unboned. That garment was meant to be worn on informal occasions, while stays were worn for court dress. In the 1790s, stays began to fall out of fashion. That coincided with the French Revolution and the adoption of neoclassical styles of dress. In the late 18th and early 19th centuries, some men were known to wear corsets, particularly the widely mocked dandies.

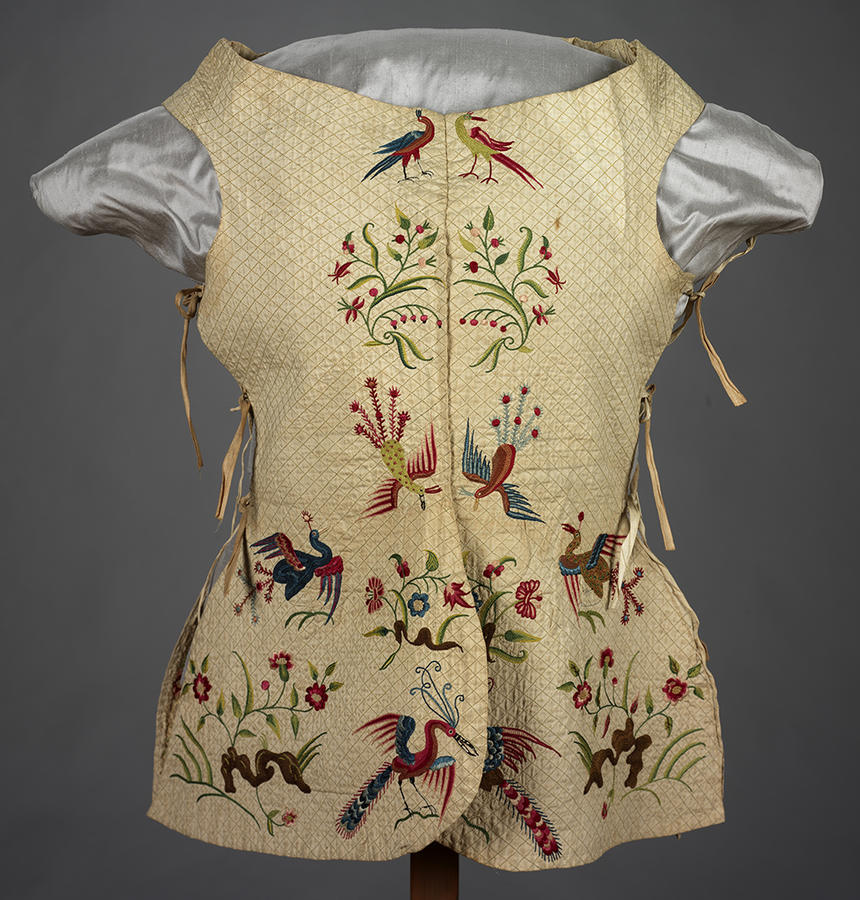
A pair of quilted linen jumps, late 17th-early 18th century

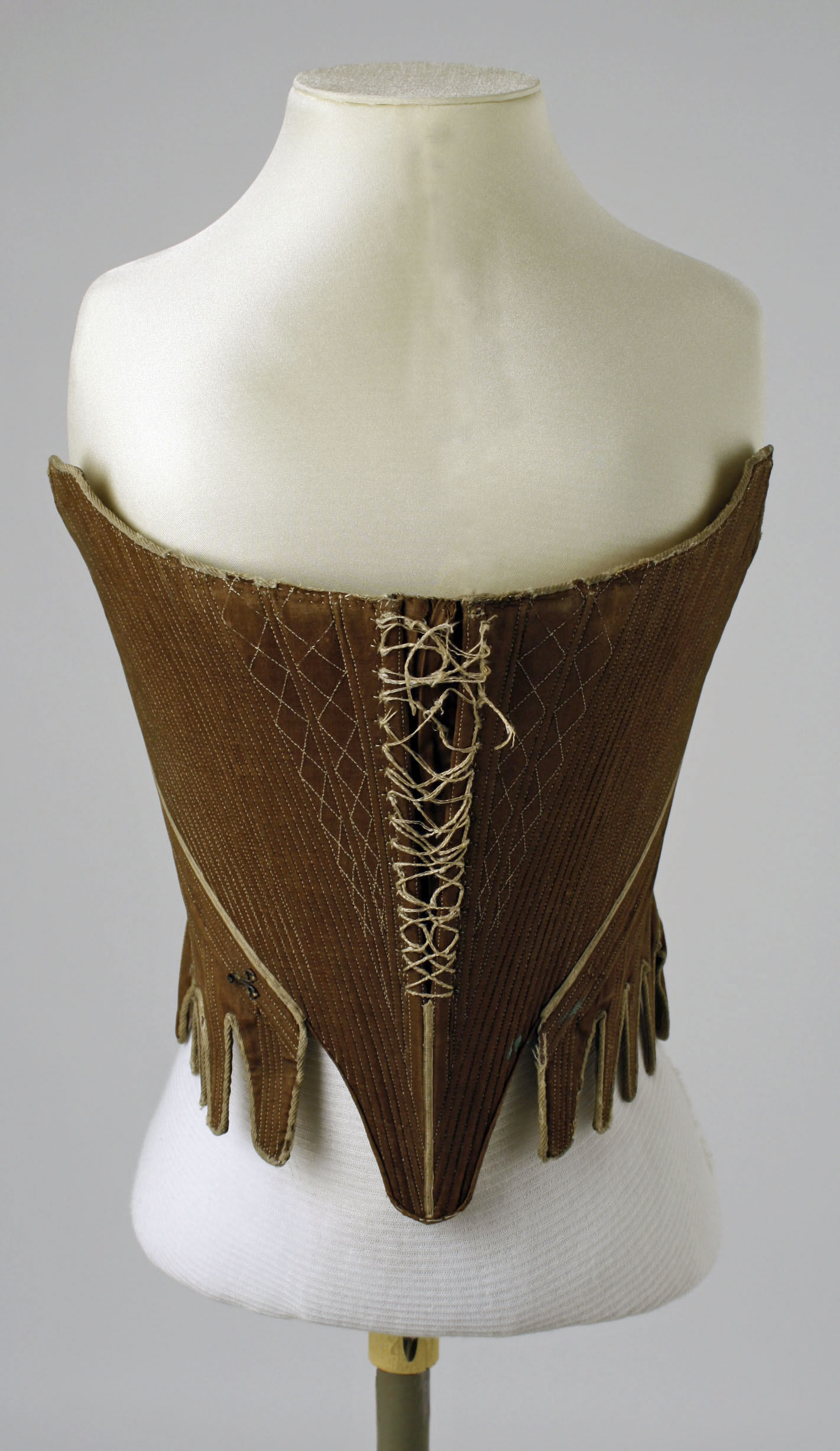
Linen stays, circa 1780

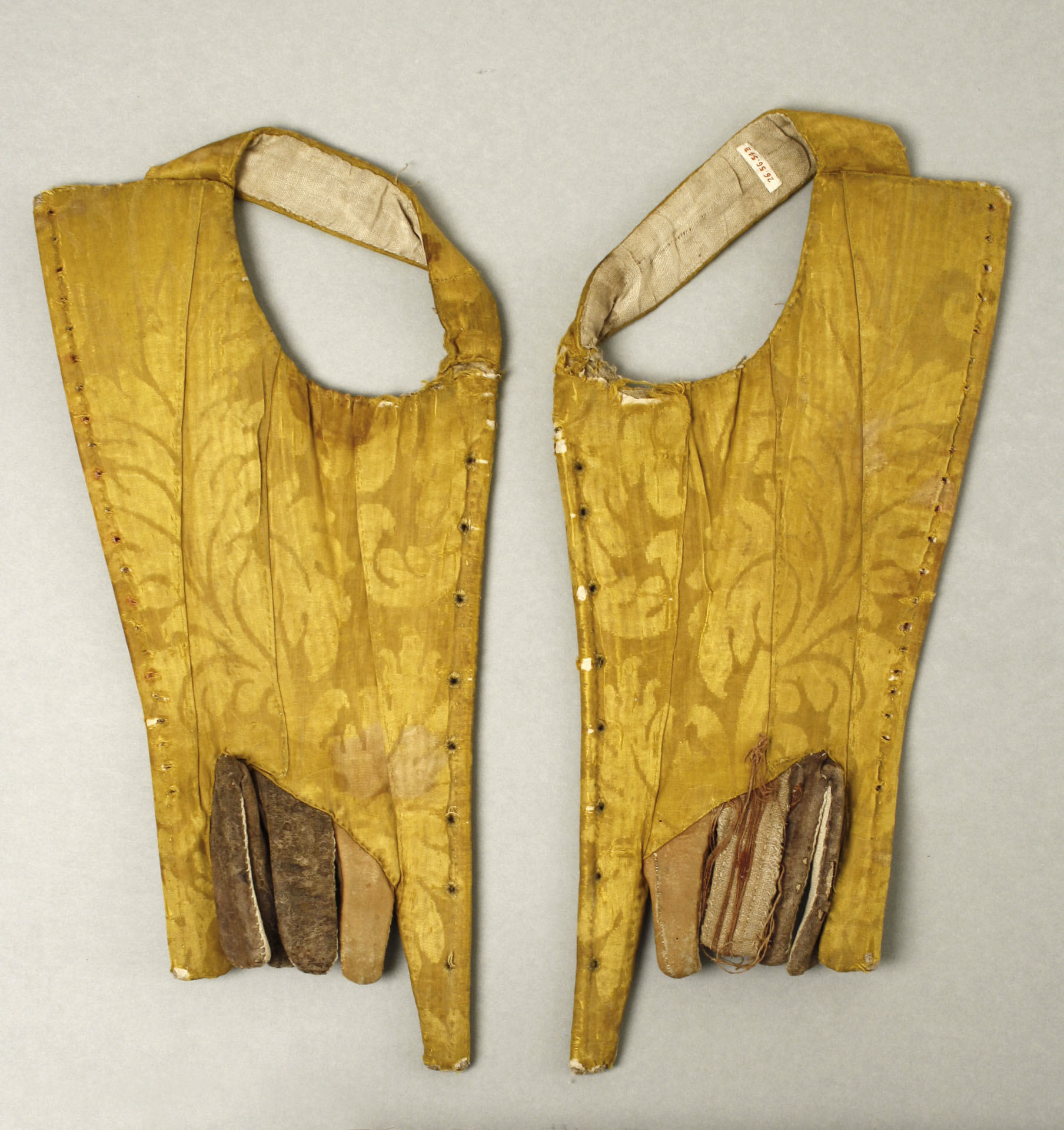
Pair of 18th century Italian stays

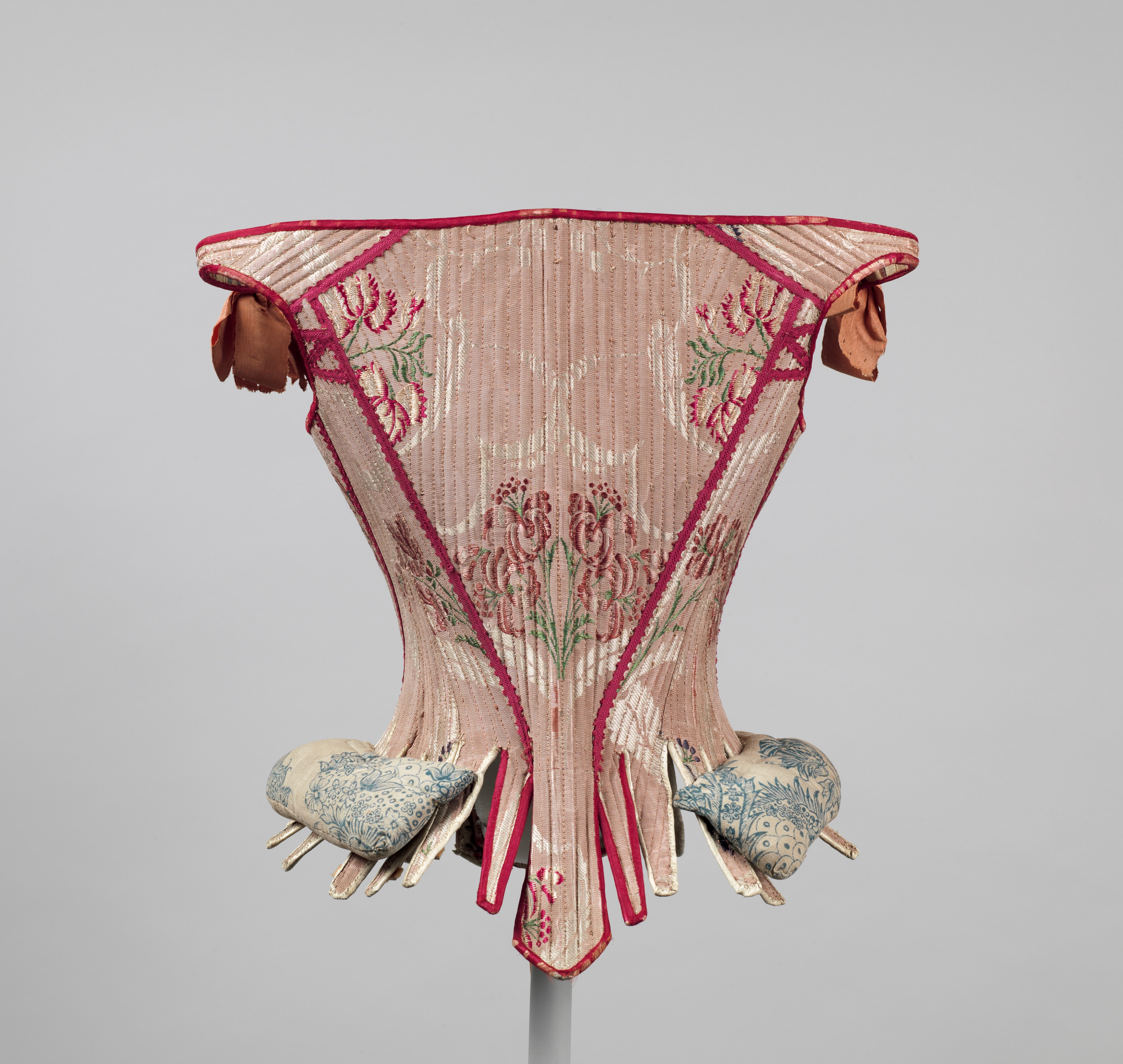
European corset from the mid-late 18th century

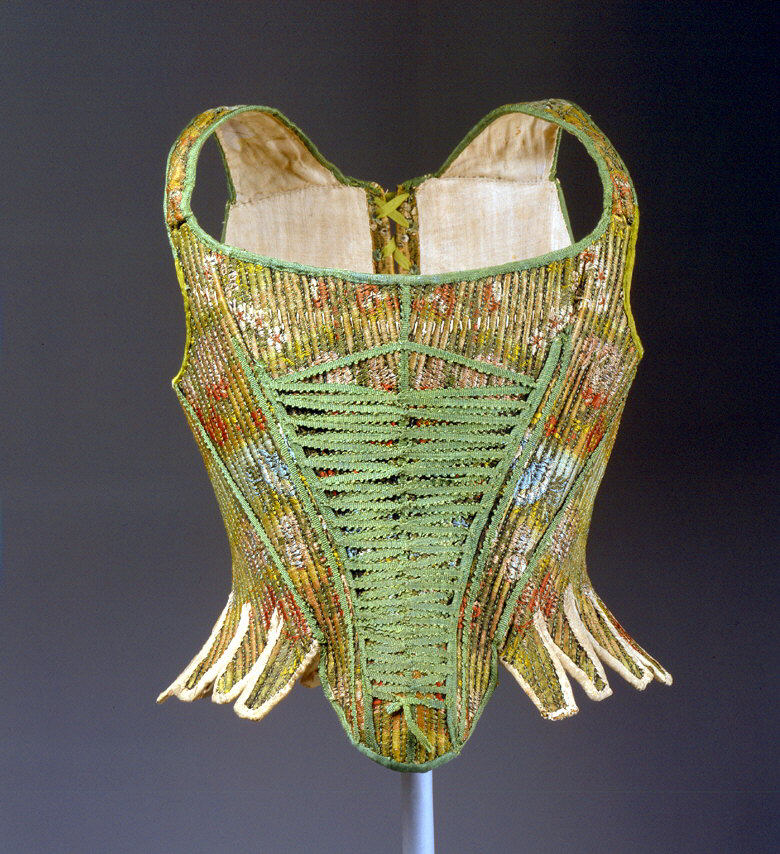
Late 1760s French corset

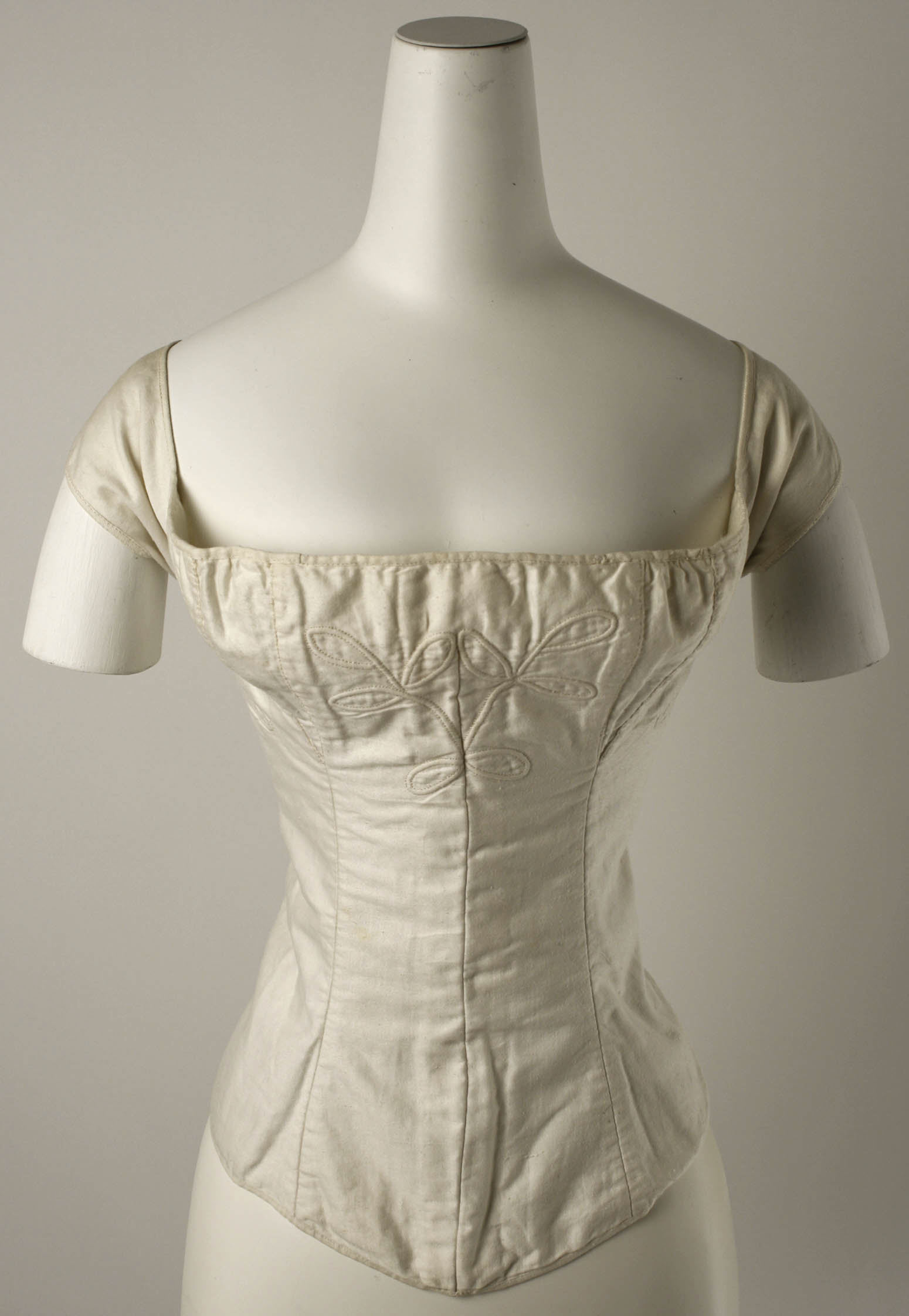
American corset circa 1820-30

=== 19th century ===
In the early 19th century, when gussets were added for room for the bust, stays became known as corsets. They also lengthened to the hip, and the lower tabs were replaced by gussets at the hip and had less boning. In the 1820s, fashion changed again, with the waistline lowered to almost the natural position. That was to allow for more ornamentation on the bodice, which, in turn, saw the return of the corset to modern fashion. Corsets began to be made with some padding, for a waist-slimming effect, and more boning. Some women made their own, while others bought their corsets. Corsets were one of the first mass-produced garments for women. They began to be more heavily boned in the 1840s, and the shoulder straps were eliminated. By 1850, steel boning became popular.

With the advent of metal eyelets in 1827, tightlacing became possible. The position of the eyelets changed. They were situated opposite one another at the back. The front was fastened with a metal busk. The corsets of the 1850s–1860s were shorter, because of a change in the silhouette of women's fashion, with the advent of the hoop skirt or crinoline. After the 1860s, as the crinoline fell out of style, the corset became longer, to shape the abdomen, exposed by the new lines of the princess or cuirass style. Corsets were often decorated with elements like boning in contrasting colors and lace trims. The spoon busk was developed in the 1870s, and served to shape the stomach and distribute pressure.

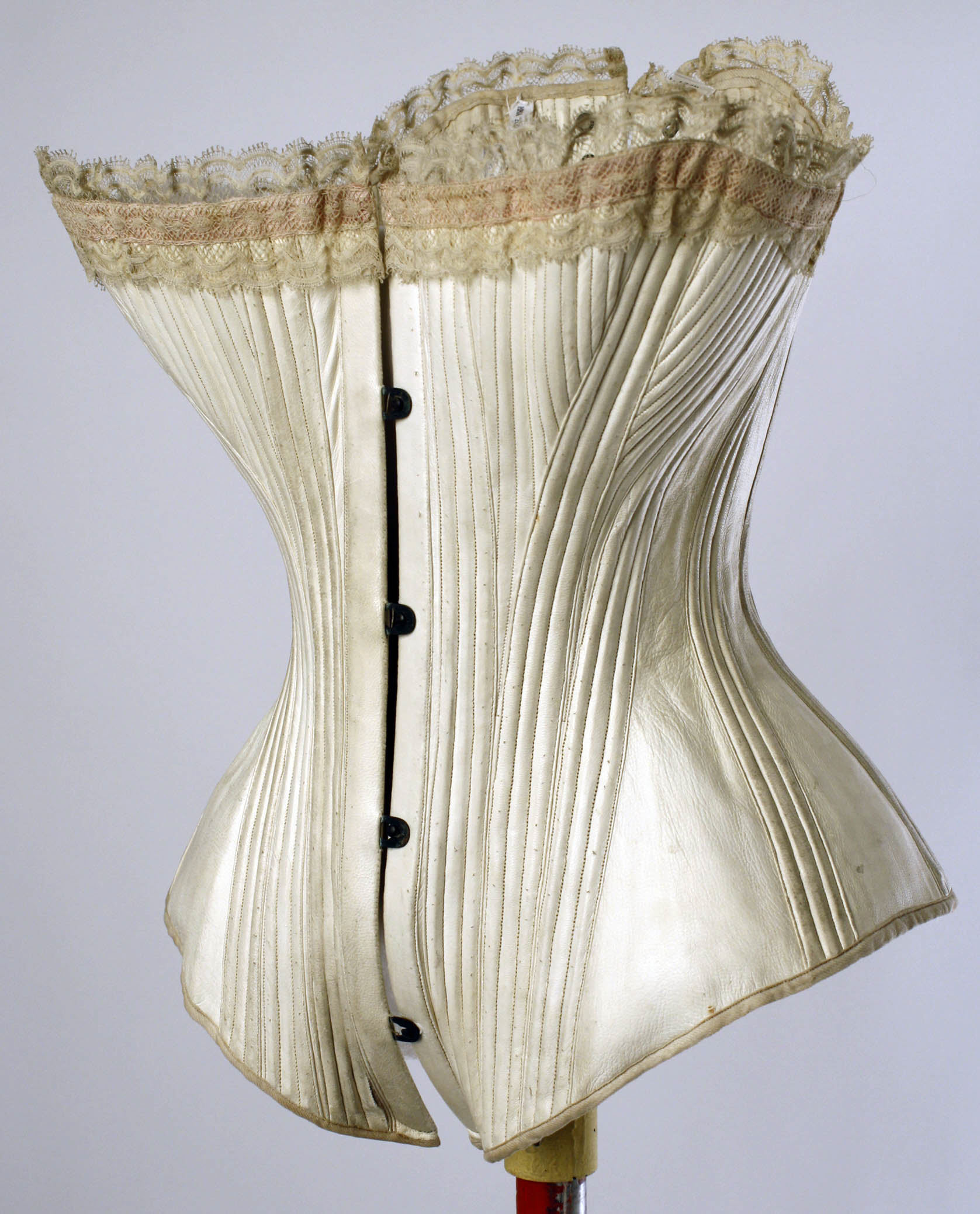
Mid-1880s French corset

In 1855, a woman named Frances Egbert had trouble with her corsets, due to the front steel pieces constantly breaking as a result of strain. Consequently, her husband, Samuel Barnes, designed "reinforced steels" for Egbert's corsets. Barnes filed a patent for the invention 11 years later, and Egbert collected the royalties on this patent for 15 years following his death. Following the case of Egbert v. Lippmann, the US Supreme court deemed Barnes's and Egbert's patent as "public".

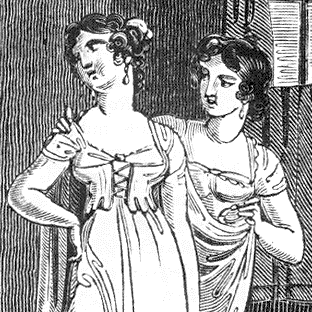
1811 illustration, depicting typical underclothes of the Regency period

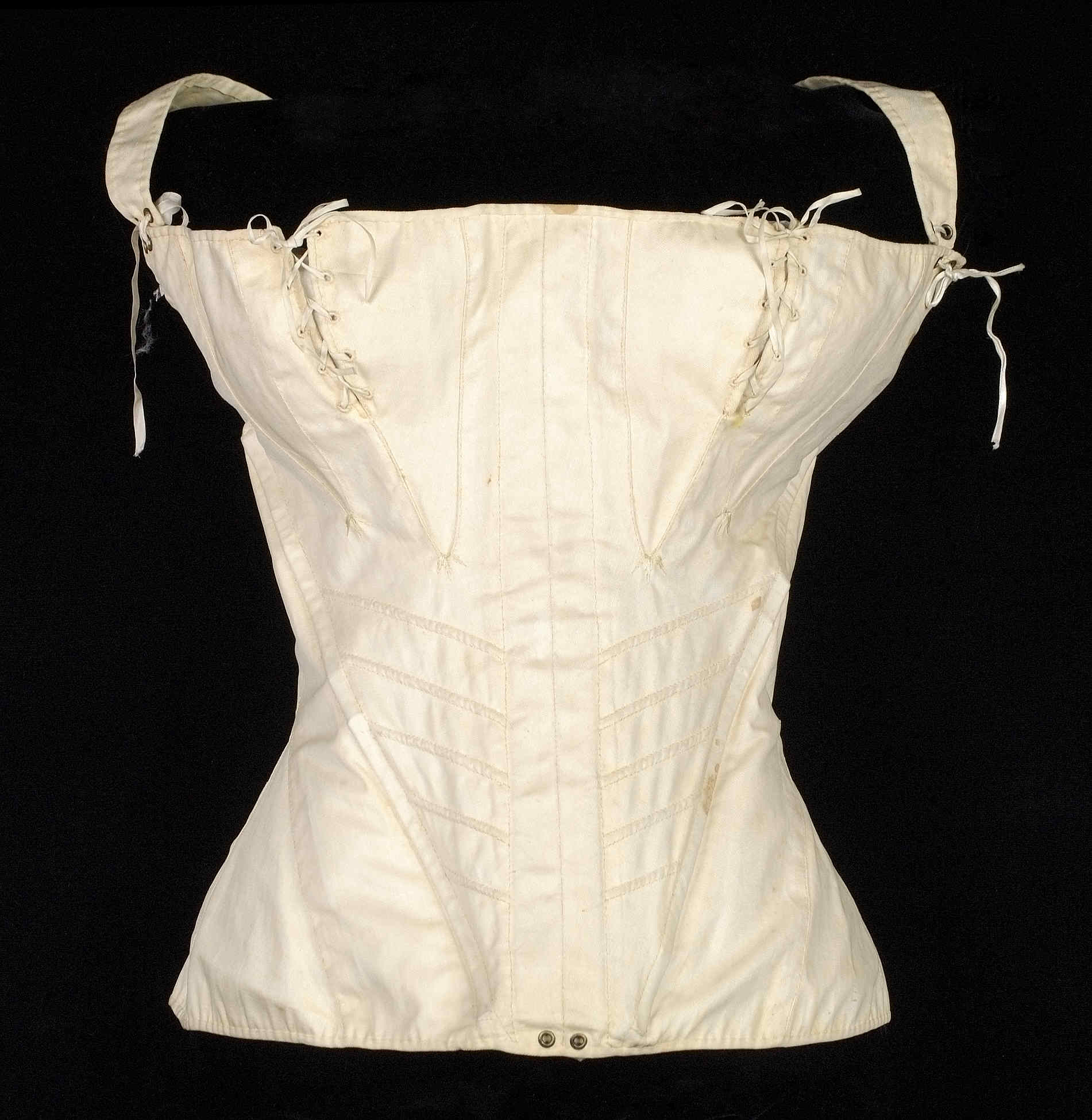
1835 pair of cotton stays from America

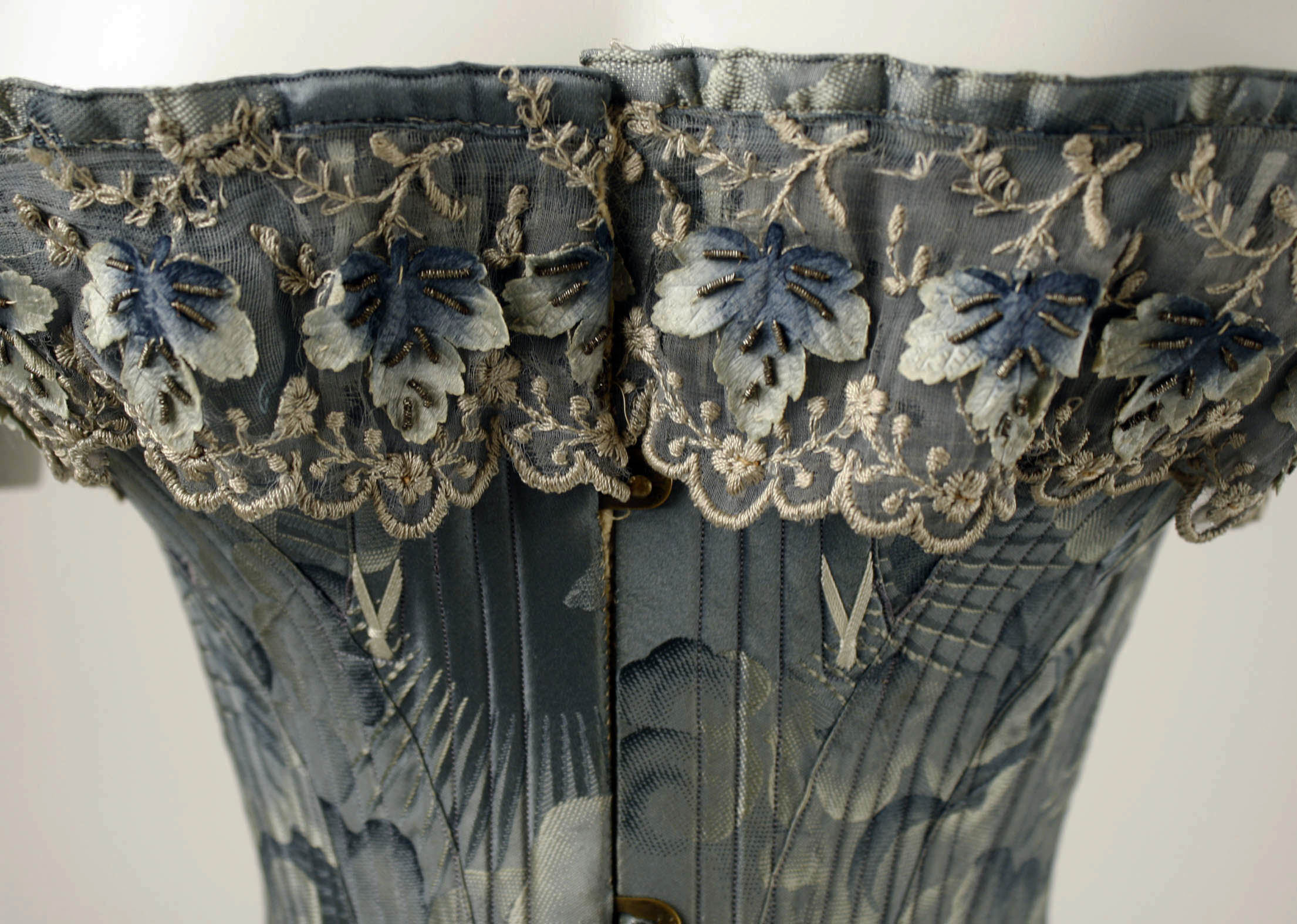
Closeup of lace details on an American corset circa 1878

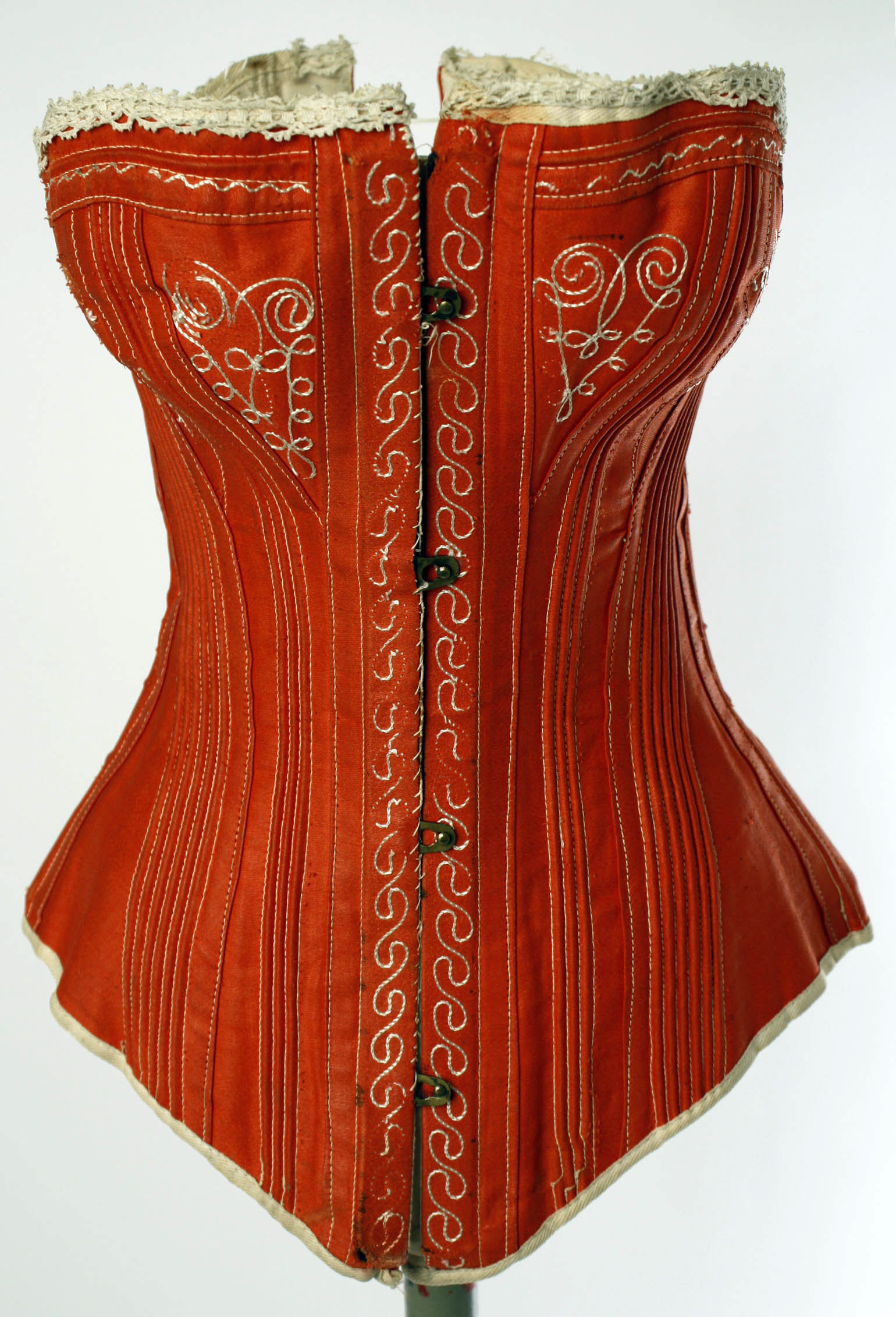
Highly decorative English corset from the 1880s with contrasting embroidery and lace trim

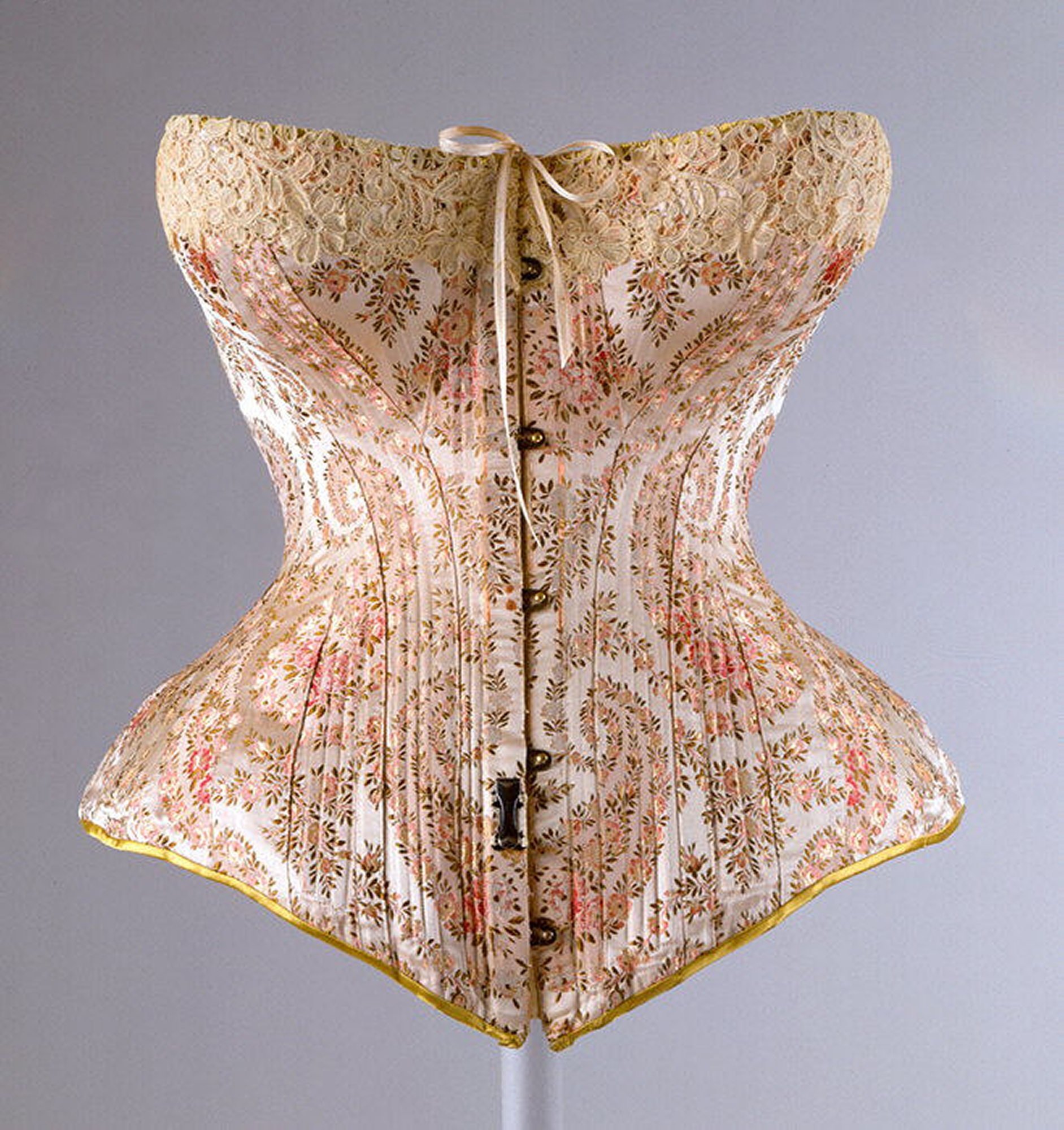
French corset made of patterned silk, 1891

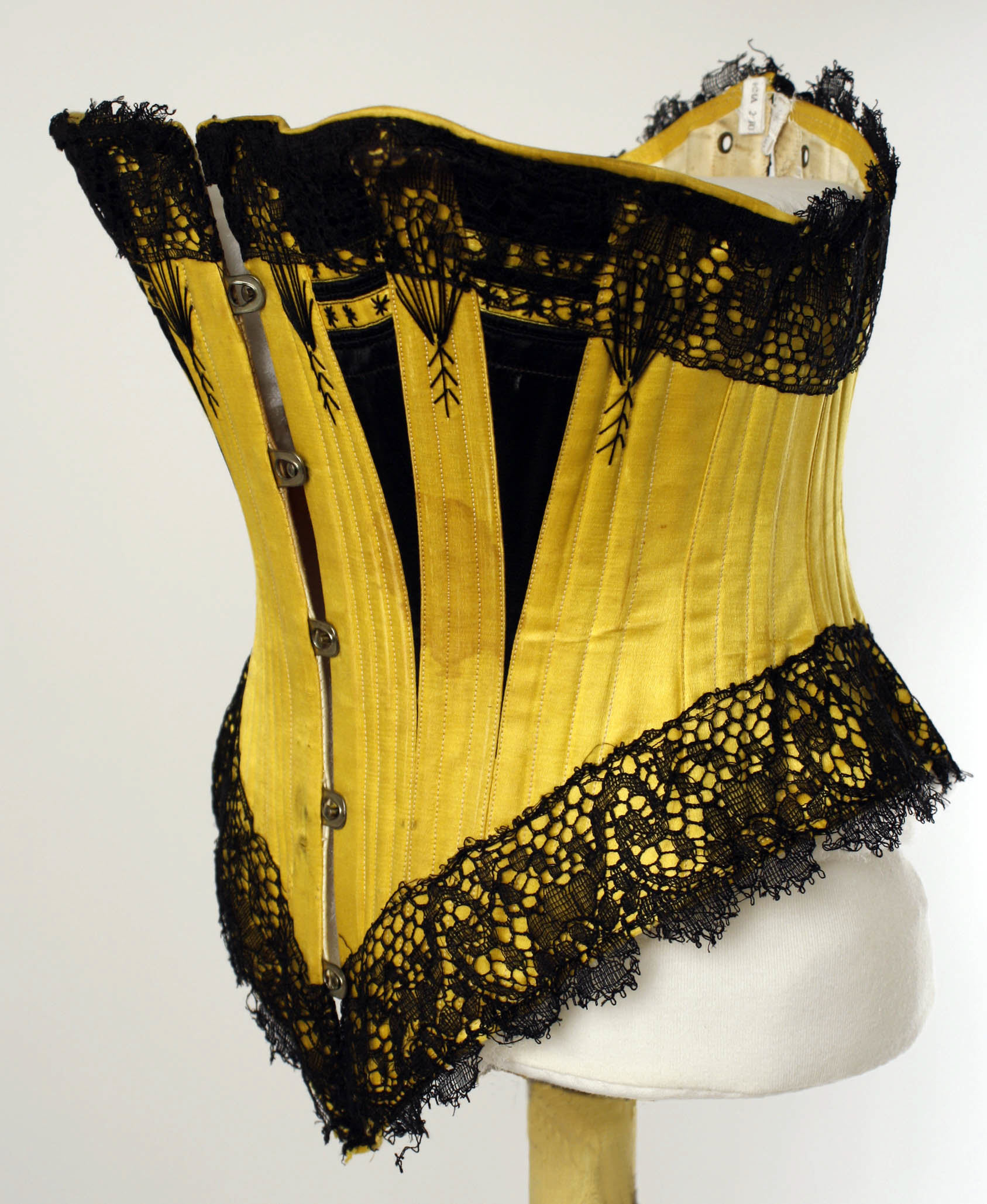
English underbust corset in contrasting black and yellow, 1880

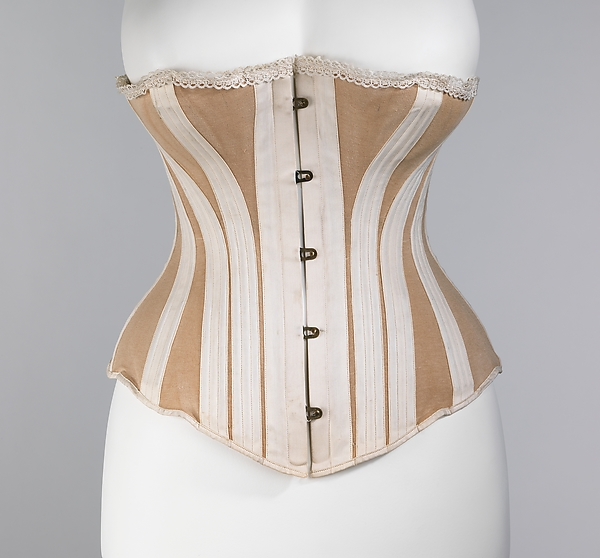
An 1885 corset made of stretch jersey, possibly to accommodate physical activity.

=== Corset controversy and dress reform ===
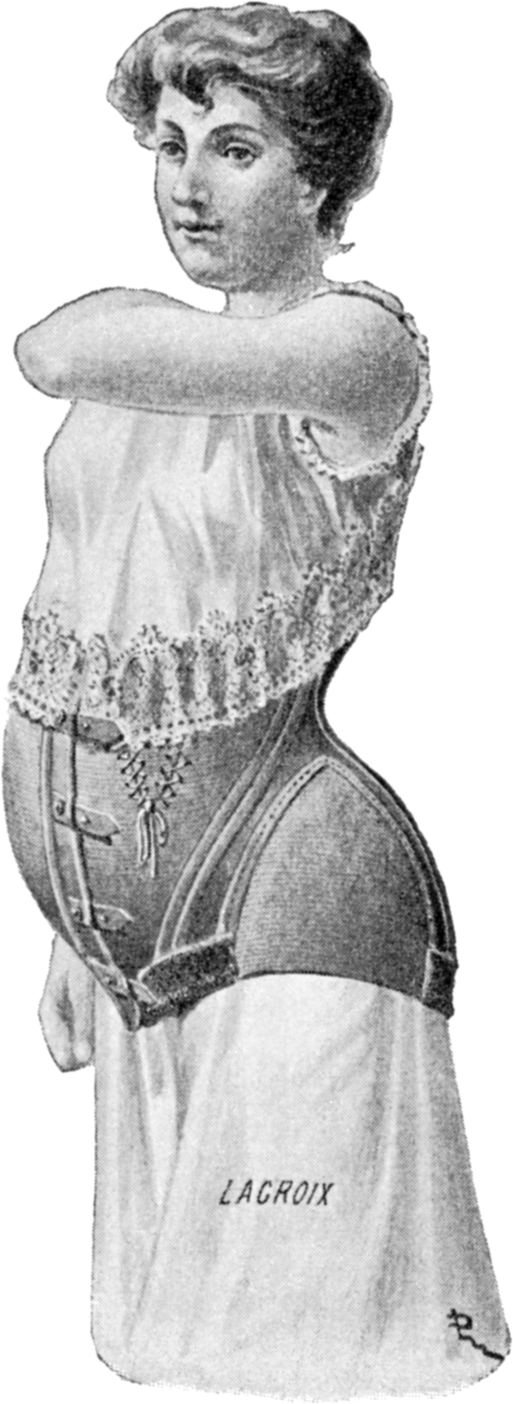
A maternity corset, 1908

The new practice of tight-lacing instigated widespread controversy. Dress reformists claimed that the corset was prompted by vanity and foolishness, and harmful to health. The reported health risks included damaged and rearranged internal organs, compromised fertility; weakness and general depletion of health. Those who were pro-corset argued that it was required for stylish dress and had its own unique pleasures; dress historian David Kunzle theorized that some enthusiastic fans of tightlacing may have experienced sexual pleasure when tightlacing, or by rubbing against the front of the corset, which contributed to the moral outrage against the practice.

The corset controversy was also closely tied to notions of social Darwinism and eugenics. The potential damage to the uterus, ovaries, and fetus was frequently pointed to as a danger to the race; i.e., the European race. Western women were thought to be weaker and more prone to birth complications than the ostensibly more vigorous, healthier, "primitive" races who did not wear corsets. Dress reformers exhorted readers to loosen their corsets, or risk destroying the "civilized" races. On the other hand, those who argued for the importance of corsets cited Darwinism as well, specifically the notion that women were less evolved and thus frailer, in need of the external support of a corset.

The reformers' critique of the corset was one part of a throng of voices clamoring against tightlacing. Doctors counseled patients against it and journalists wrote articles condemning the vanity and frivolity of women who would sacrifice their health for the sake of fashion. Although for many, corseting was accepted as necessary for health, propriety, and an upright military-style posture, dress reformers viewed tightlacing, especially at the height of the era of Victorian morality, as a sign of moral indecency.

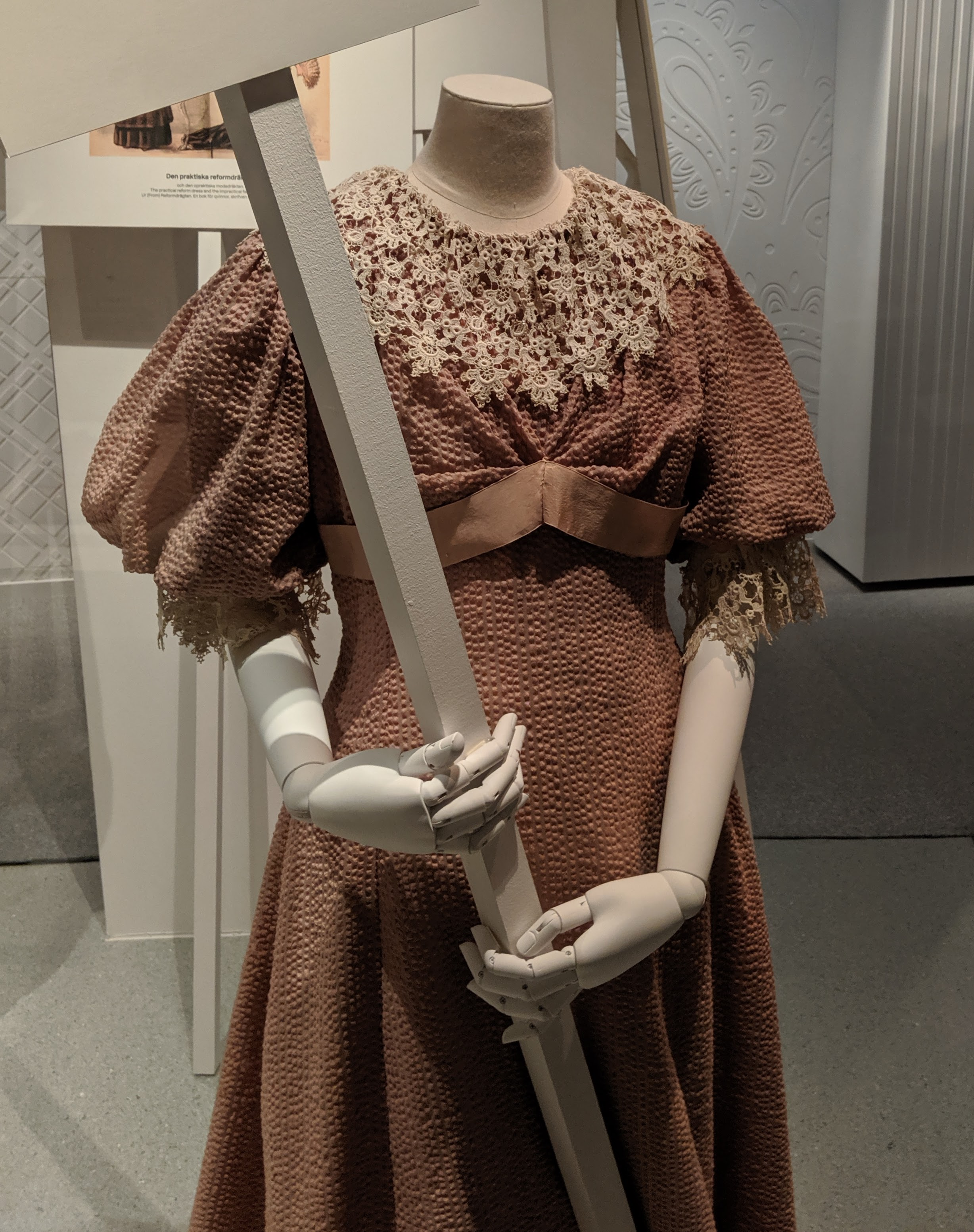
Dress designed by Swedish dress reformist Kristine Dahl for feminist activist Gurli Linder, 1890s, intended to be worn sans corset or bustle.

American women active in the anti-slavery and temperance movements, with experience in public speaking and political agitation, advocated for and wore sensible clothing that would not restrict their movement, although corsets were a part of their wardrobe. While supporters of fashionable dress contended that corsets maintained an upright, "good figure", and were a necessary physical structure for a moral and well-ordered society, dress reformers maintained that women's fashions were not only physically detrimental, but "the results of male conspiracy to make women subservient by cultivating them in slave psychology". They believed a change in fashions could change the position of women in society, allowing for greater social mobility, independence from men and marriage, and the ability to work for wages, as well as physical movement and comfort.

In 1873, Elizabeth Stuart Phelps Ward wrote:

Burn up the corsets! ... No, nor do you save the whalebones, you will never need whalebones again. Make a bonfire of the cruel steels that have lorded it over your thorax and abdomens for so many years and heave a sigh of relief, for your emancipation I assure you, from this moment has begun.

Despite those protests, little changed in fashion and undergarments up to 1900. The majority accepted corsets as necessary on some level, and relatively few advocated for it to be abandoned entirely. The primary result of the dress reform movement was the evolution, rather than elimination, of the corset. Because of the public health outcry surrounding corsets and tightlacing, doctors took it upon themselves to become corsetieres. Many doctors helped to fit their patients with corsets to avoid the dangers of ill-fitting corsets, and some doctors even designed corsets themselves. Roxey Ann Caplin became a widely renowned corset maker, enlisting the help of her husband, a physician, to create corsets which she purported to be more respectful of human anatomy. Health corsets and "rational corsets" became popular alternatives to the boned corset. They included features such as wool lining, watch springs as boning, elastic or mesh paneling, and other features purported to be less detrimental to one's health.

In the 1890s, Inès Gaches-Sarraute designed the straight-front corset in response to her patients' gynecological issues which were attributed to wearing corsets. The design was intended to reduce pressure on the abdomen and improve overall health. The new S-curve silhouette created by this design quickly caught on among fashion houses in the early 20th century. The style was worn from 1900 to 1908.

=== Early 20th century ===
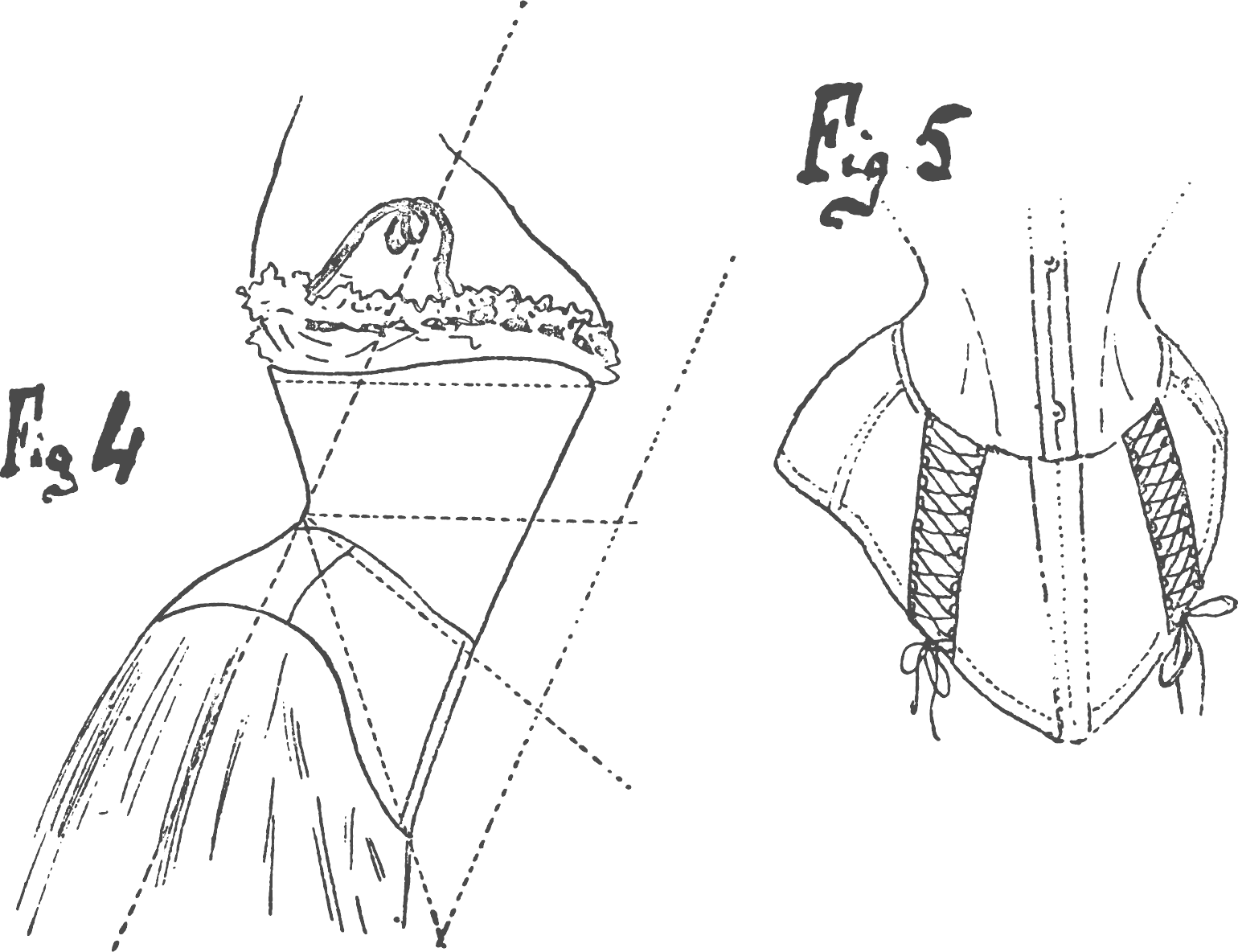
Diagram of a straight-front corset, 1902

The corset reached its longest length in the early 20th century. At first, the longline corset reached from the bust down to the upper thigh. There was also a style of longline corset that started under the bust, and necessitated the wearing of a brassiere, a style that was meant to complement the new silhouette. It was a boneless style, much closer to a modern girdle than the traditional corset. From 1908 to 1914, the fashionable narrow-hipped and narrow-skirted silhouette necessitated the lengthening of the corset at its lower edge. Meanwhile, as bras began to catch on in the 1910s, fewer and fewer corsets included bust support. The fashionable corsets of this period covered the thighs and changed the position of the hips, making the waist appear higher and wider and the hips narrower, forecasting the "flapper" silhouette of the 1920s. The new fashion was considered uncomfortable, cumbersome, and required the use of strips of elastic fabric. The development of rubberized elastic materials in 1911 helped the girdle replace the corset.

In 1910, the physician Robert Latou Dickinson published "Toleration of the corset: Prescribing where one cannot proscribe", in which he investigated the medical effects of corsets, including the displacement and deformation of internal organs. He found that, while some women could wear these garments without apparent harm, the vast majority of users sustained permanent deformations and damage to their health. The purportedly healthier S-line corsets still restricted costal breathing and exerted pressure downwards on the pelvis.

The longline style was abandoned during World War I, in part to save materials for the war effort. However, even prior to World War I, corsets had begun to fall out of fashion. Women's lives were increasingly active outside the home and in the workforce, which necessitated more simplified clothing. By 1913, the size and weight of a typical garment was significantly reduced; a 81 centimetres (32 in) waist was considered acceptable where before a 51 centimetres (20 in) waist was the standard.

In the late 1940s and early 1950s, there was a brief revival of the corset in the form of the waist cincher, as well as the full-on corset style under the "Merry Widow" style (named after the 1952 film of the same name). This was used to give the hourglass figure as dictated by Christian Dior's "New Look". However, use of the waist cincher was restricted to haute couture, and most women continued to use girdles. Waspies were also met with push-back from women's organizations in the United States, as well as female members of the British Parliament, because corsetry had been forbidden under rationing during World War II. The revival ended when the New Look gave way to a less dramatically shaped silhouette.

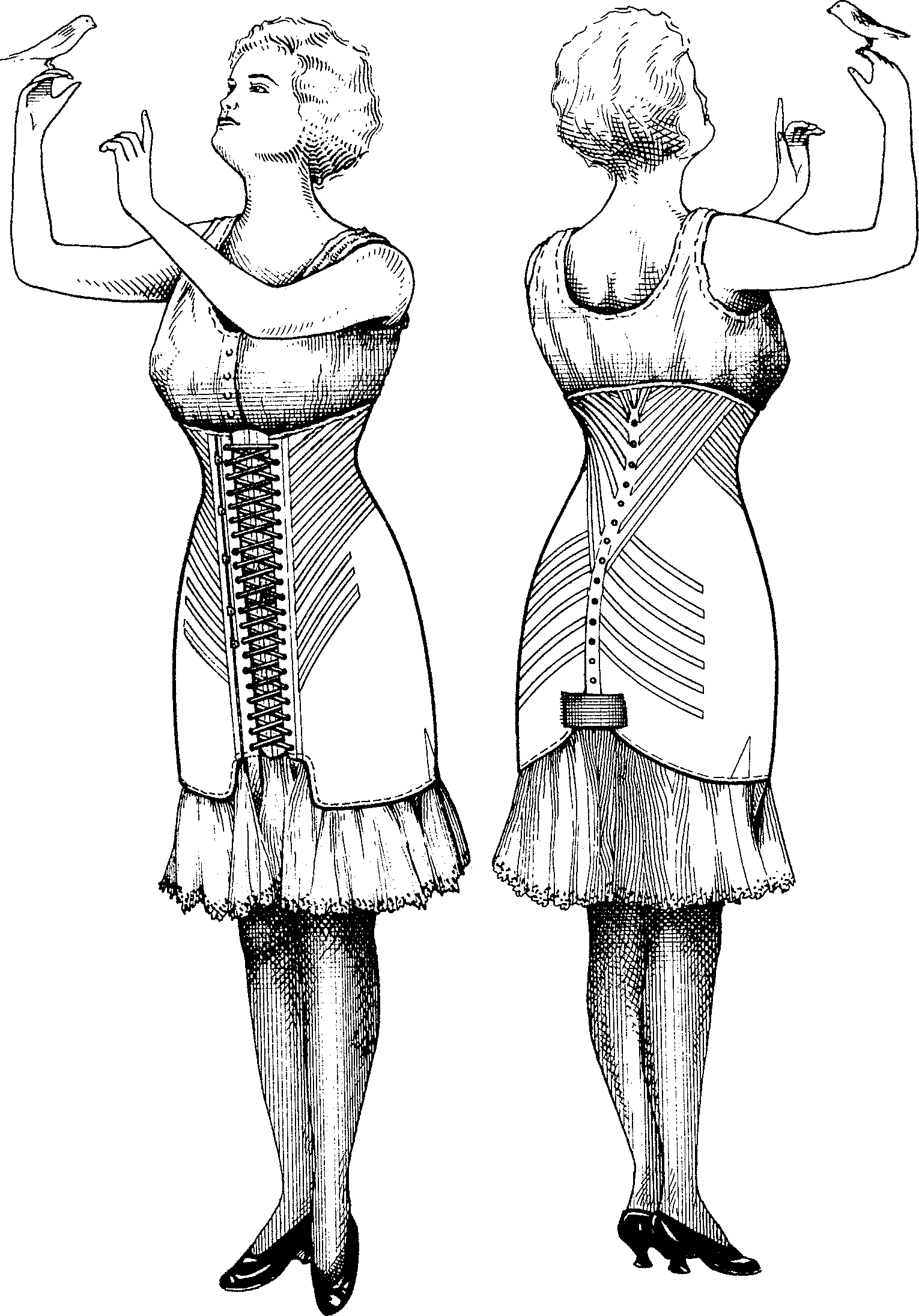
A longline hip-slimming corset, 1917

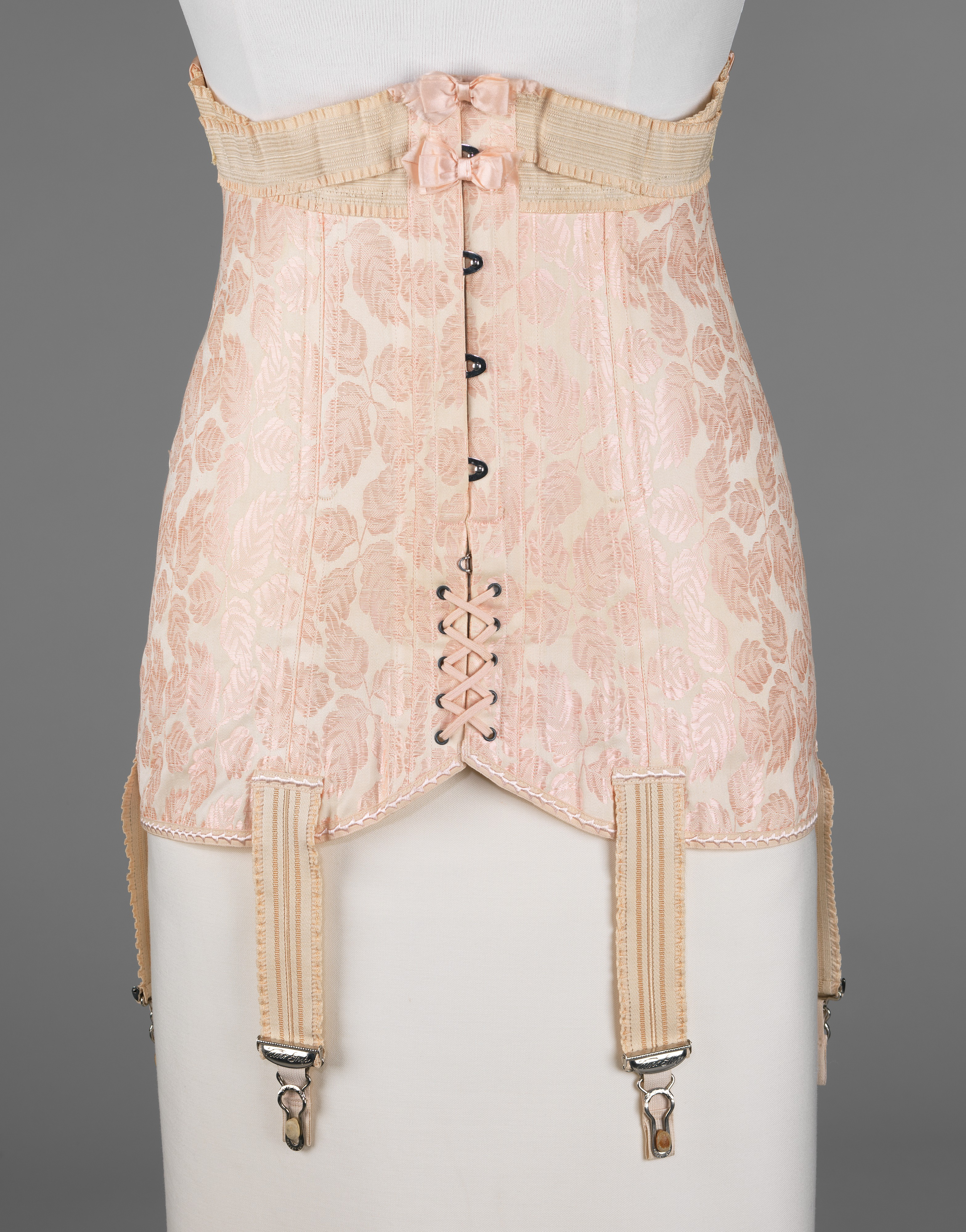
A 1918 longline corset.

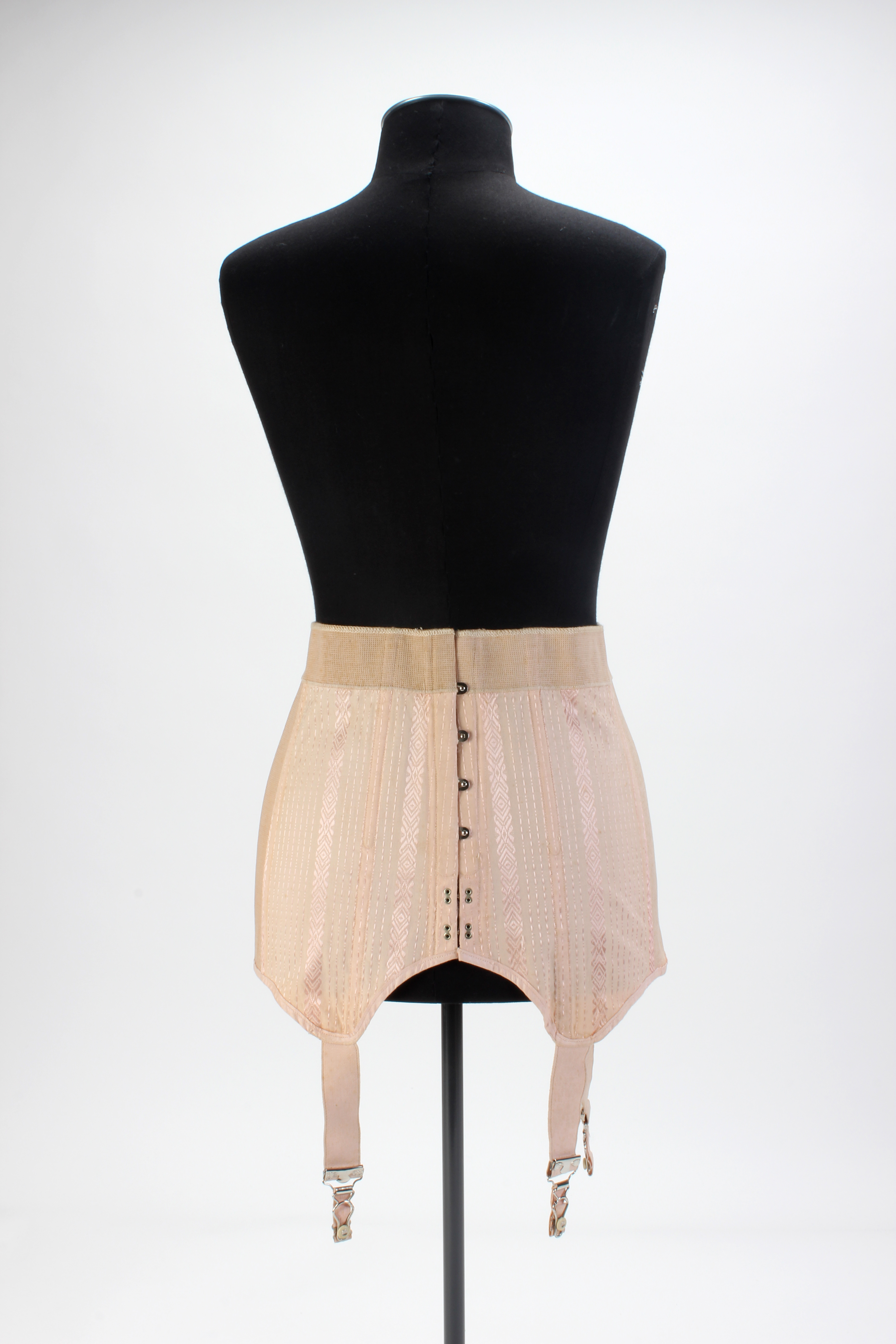
1930s elasticated girdle, with stocking garters.

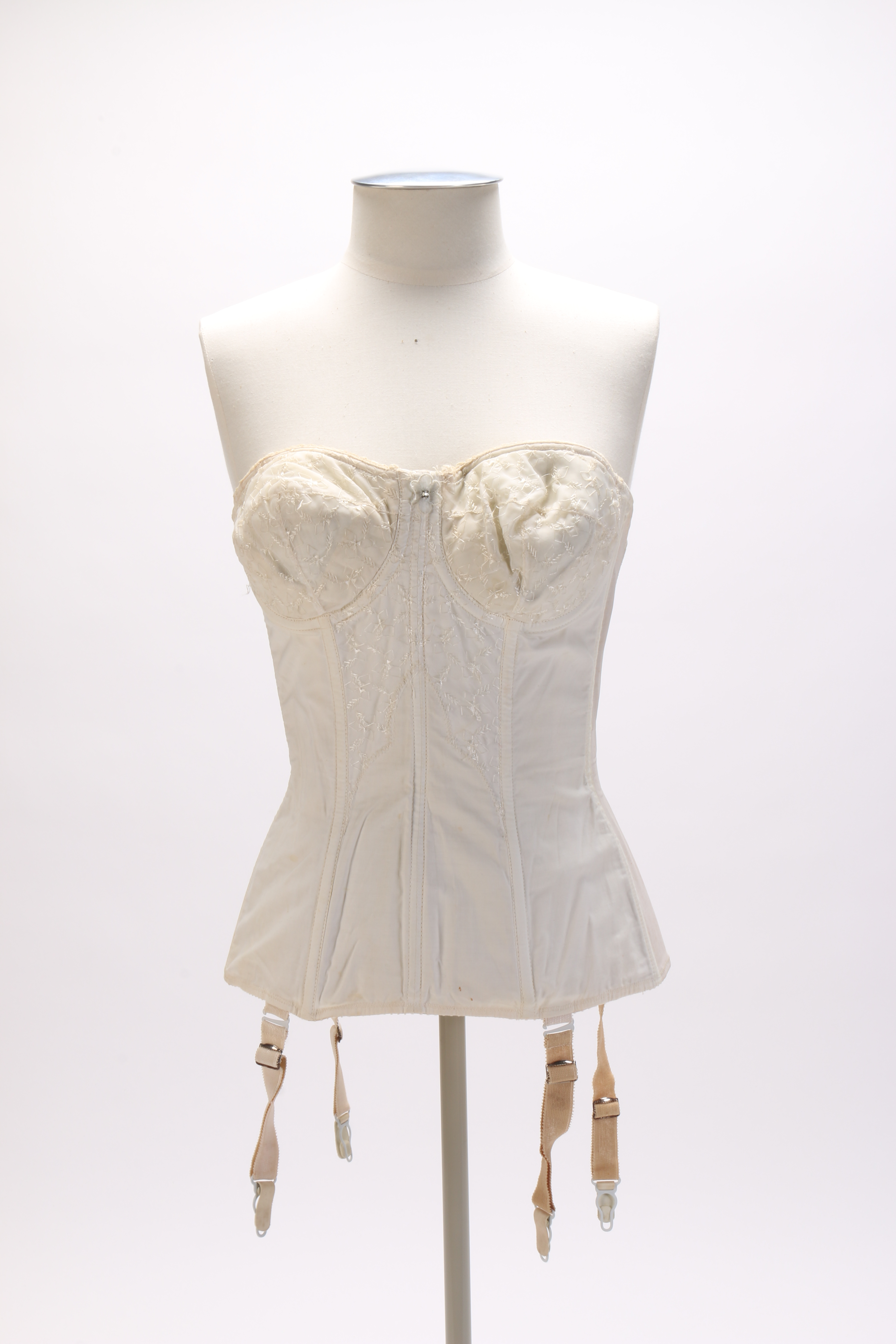
Cotton and elastic 1950s corselette, with nylon bra cups and garters

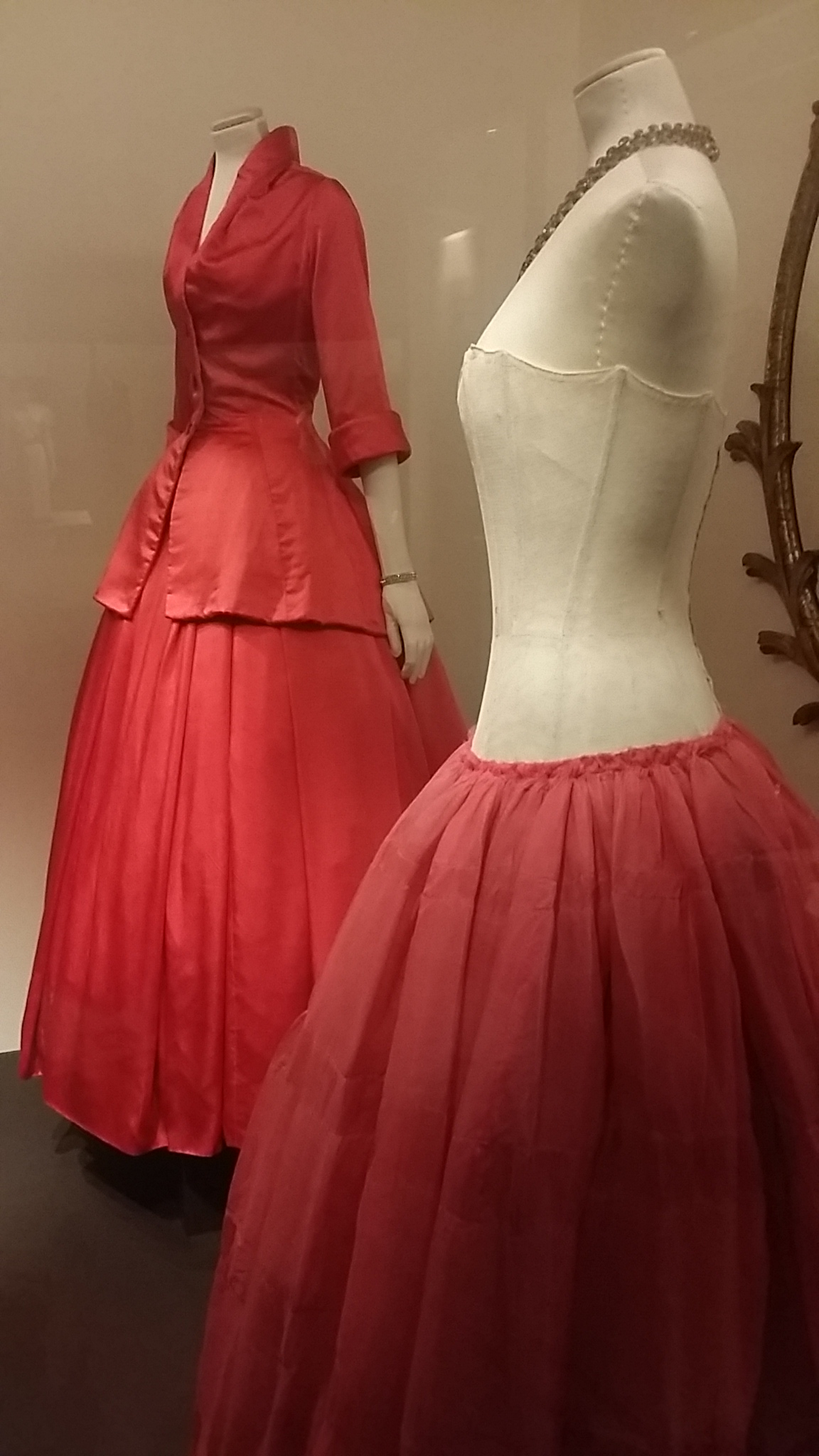
1954 Christian Dior evening gown featuring boned corset bodice.

=== Late 20th and 21st century ===
By the 1960s, the advent of hippie culture and youth rebellion led the wasp-waisted silhouette to fall out of favor. Feminist activists protested against the restrictive nature of Dior's designs. In 1968 at the feminist Miss America protest, protestors symbolically threw a number of feminine products into a "Freedom Trash Can." These included girdles and corsets, which were among items the protestors called "instruments of female torture". The 1960s and 1970s saw the rise of popular fitness culture, and diet, plastic surgery (modern liposuction was invented in the mid-1970s), and exercise became the preferred methods of achieving a thin waist. The sexual revolution of the 1960s and 70s brought with it midriff-revealing styles like the crop top, and many women chose to forgo supportive undergarments like girdles or corsets, preferring a more athletic figure.

The corset has largely fallen out of mainstream fashion since the 1920s in Europe and North America, replaced by girdles and elastic brassieres, but has survived as an article of costume. Originally an item of lingerie, the corset has become a popular item of outerwear in the fetish, BDSM, and Goth subcultures. In the fetish and BDSM literature, there is often much emphasis on tightlacing, and many corset makers cater to the fetish market.

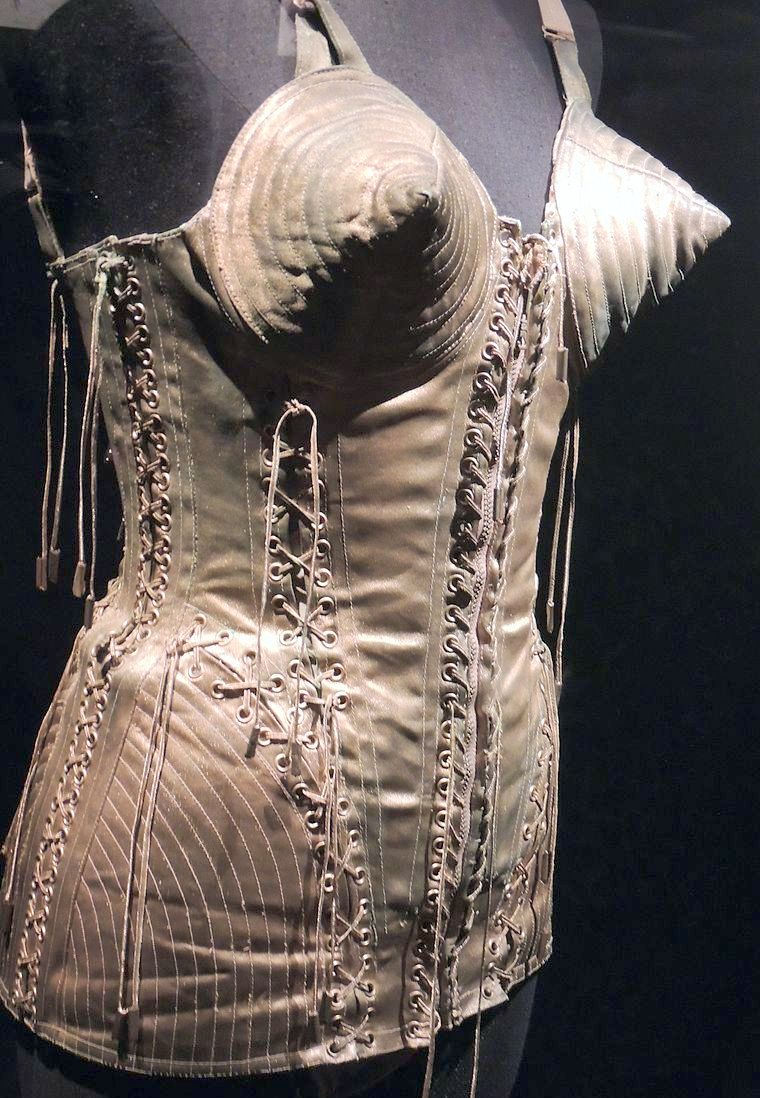
Jean Paul Gaultier corset worn by singer Madonna in the 1990 Blond Ambition World Tour.

Corsets are frequently worn by actors in productions with historical settings or by historical reenactors. Modern historical fiction films and TV shows such as Bridgerton have renewed interest in corsets while also drawing attention to potential health risks as actresses including Emma Stone, Cara Delevingne, and Simone Ashley have complained about discomfort wearing them during the course of their careers. Into the present, the corset has been seen as a sign of patriarchal oppression; however, conceptions of the social role of the corset continue to evolve to consider how the writings of men have had an undue influence perception of historical corsetry. Sarah Bendall, a material culture and fashion historian, states, “men ridiculed the fashion or used it to make a moral point about how silly the women were - and that's what has been relied on.”

In the 1960s, then-vintage garments such as chemises, corsets, and corset covers became acceptable as outerwear; forms of these garments can still be seen today in modern undergarments and sleepwear. Since the late 1980s, the corset has experienced periodic revivals, all which have usually originated in haute couture and have occasionally trickled through to mainstream fashion. Jean-Paul Gaultier's corset "bustiers" were popularized by pop musician Madonna, and could be worn as a top or under a jacket. Fashion designer Vivienne Westwood's use of corsets contributed to the push-up bust trend that lasted from the late 1980s throughout the 1990s.

The strongest of the revivals was seen in the Autumn 2001 fashion collections and coincided with the release of the film Moulin Rouge!, in which the costumes featured many corsets as characteristic of the era. Another fashion movement, which has renewed interest in the corset, is the steampunk subculture that utilizes late-Victorian fashion shapes in new ways. In the early 2020s, corset-inspired tops and dresses began to trend as part of the regencycore aesthetic, inspired by television series like Bridgerton and The Gilded Age. These designs typically do not incorporate any form of boning.

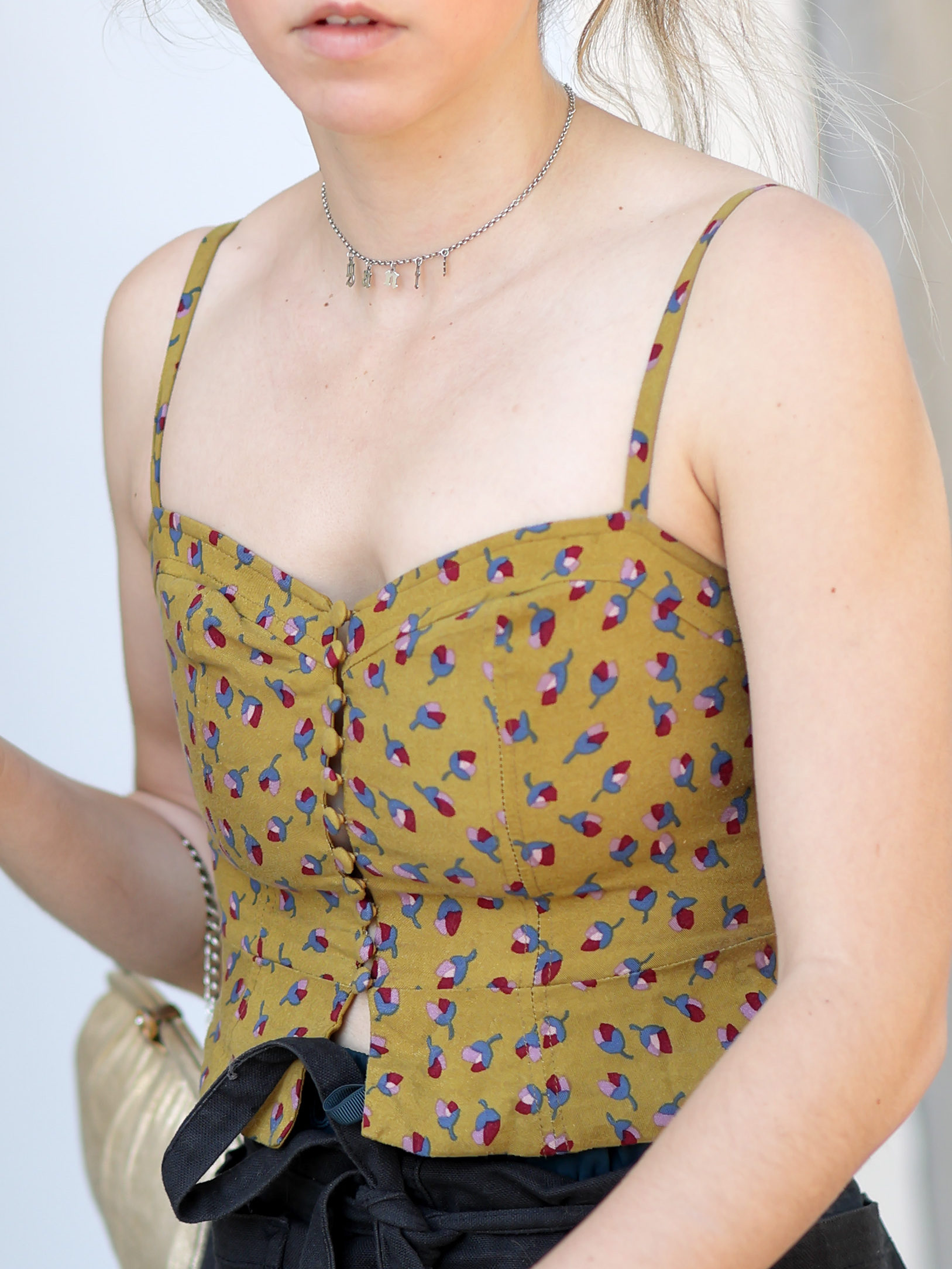
Corset-style top worn in 2021

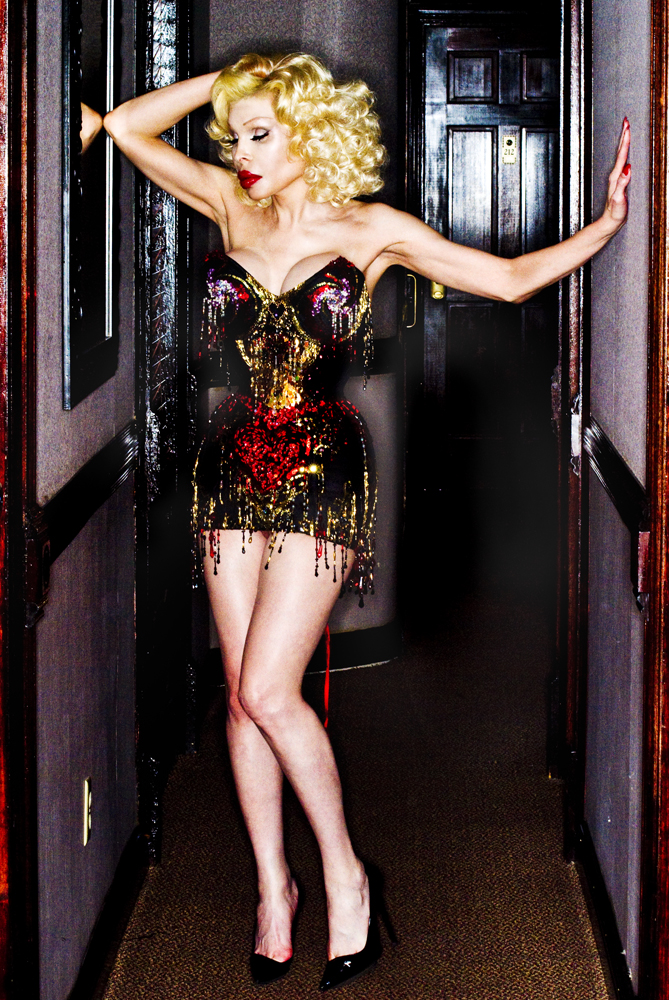
Amanda Lepore wearing a corset designed by Gabriel Moginot

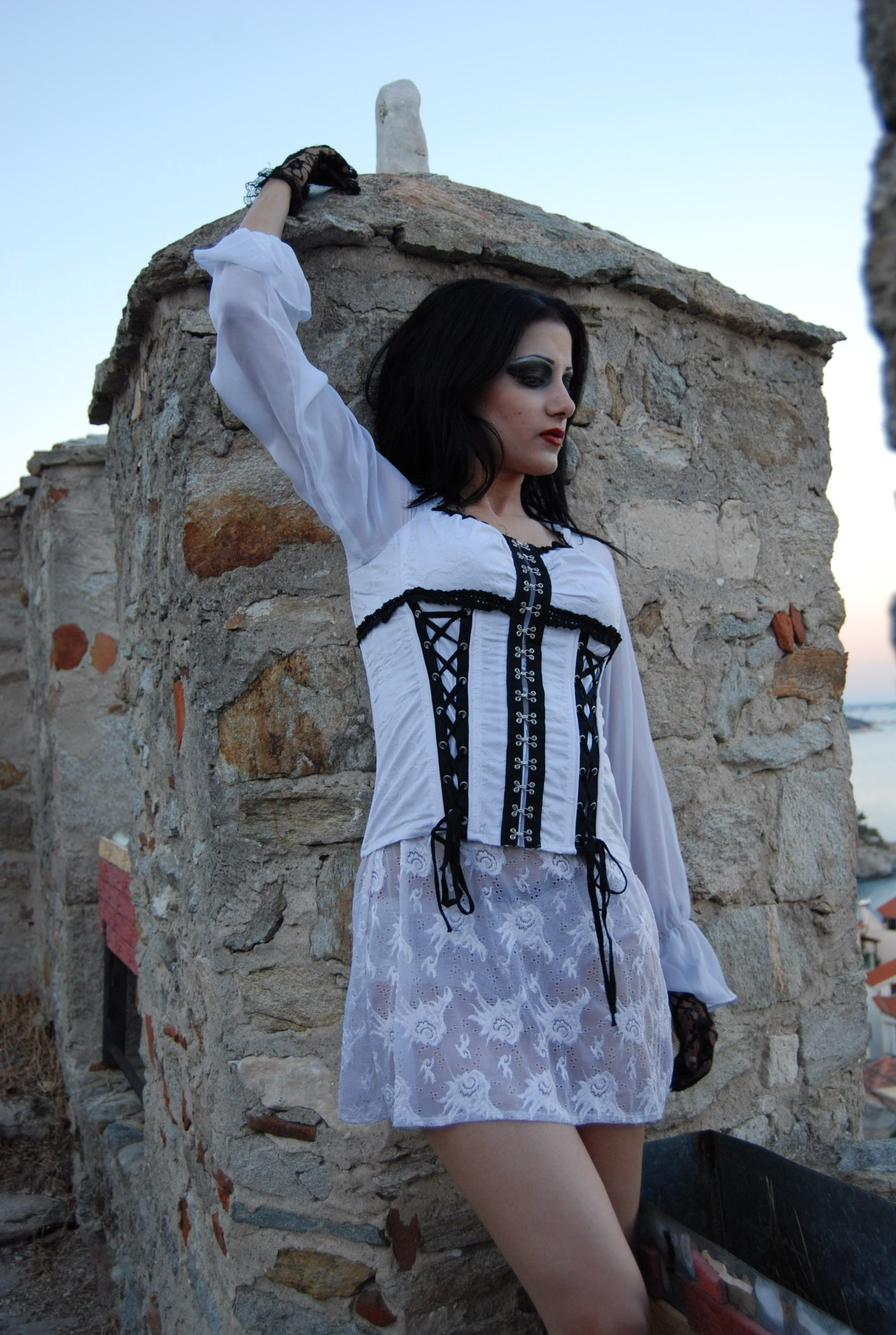
A photoshoot featuring a blouse with corset-inspired lacing and hook-eye closures.

== Special variants ==
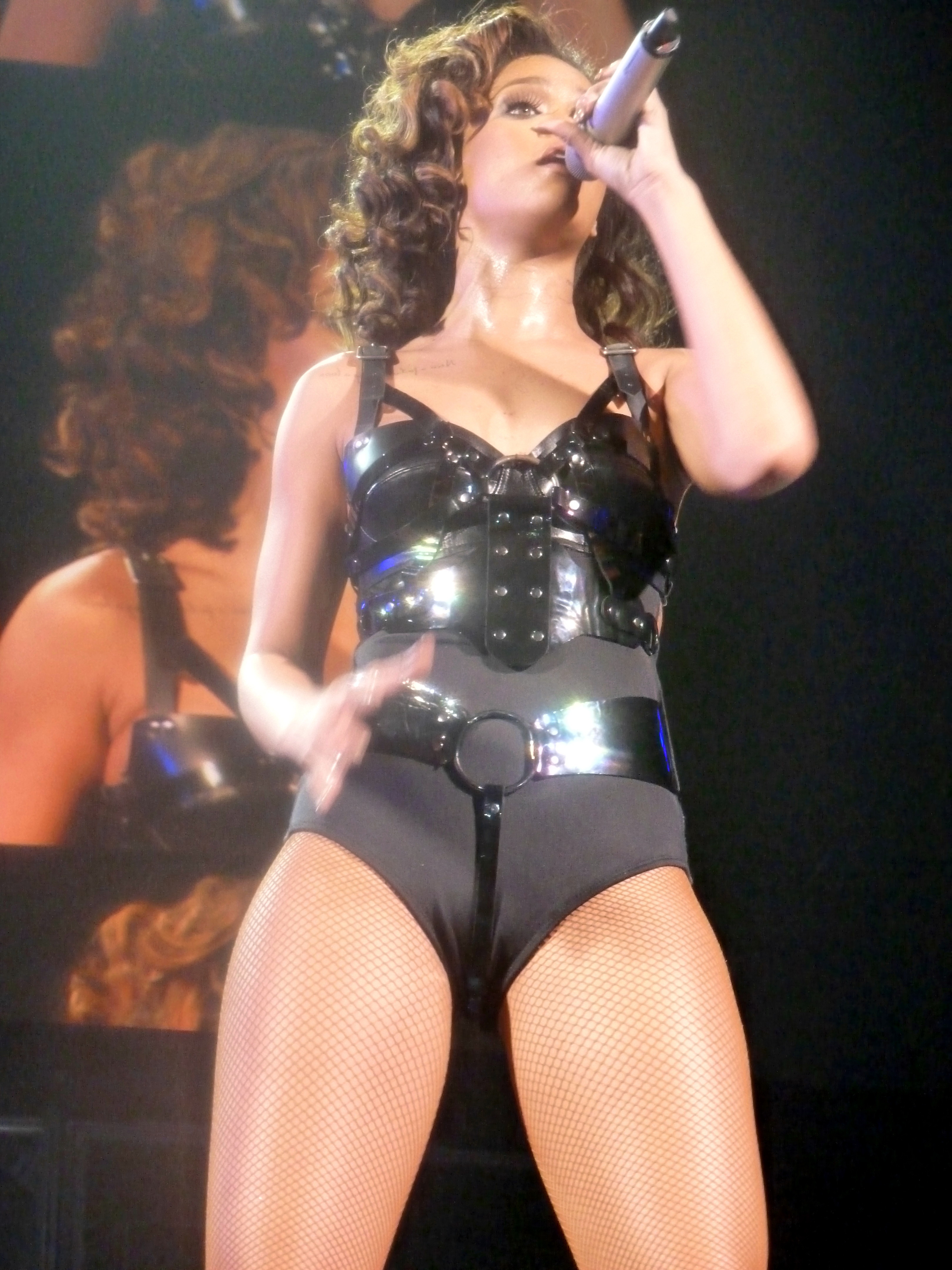
Singer Rihanna wearing a modified corset along with underwear as outerwear.

There are some special types of corsets and corset-like devices which incorporate boning.

=== Corset dress ===
A corset dress (also known as hobble corset because it produces similar restrictive effects to a hobble skirt) is a long corset. It is like an ordinary corset, but it is long enough to cover the legs, partially or totally. It thus looks like a dress, hence the name. A person wearing a corset dress can have great difficulty in walking up and down the stairs (especially if wearing high-heeled footwear) and may be unable to sit down if the boning is too stiff.

Other types of corset dresses are created for unique high fashion looks by a few modern corset makers. These modern styles are functional as well as fashionable and are designed to be worn with comfort for a dramatic look.

=== Neck corset and collar ===
A neck corset is a type of posture collar incorporating stays and it is generally not considered to be a true corset. This type of corset and its purpose of improving posture does not have long term results. Since certain parts of the neck are being pulled towards the head, a band in the neck, called the platysmal band, will most likely disappear. Like the neck corset, a collar serves some of the same purposes. The neck collar can be worn to allow minimal neck movement after road accidents, and is more accessible and cheap than physiotherapy. However, neck corsets and collars are more often used as a fashion statement or as an element of BDSM rather than physiotherapy.

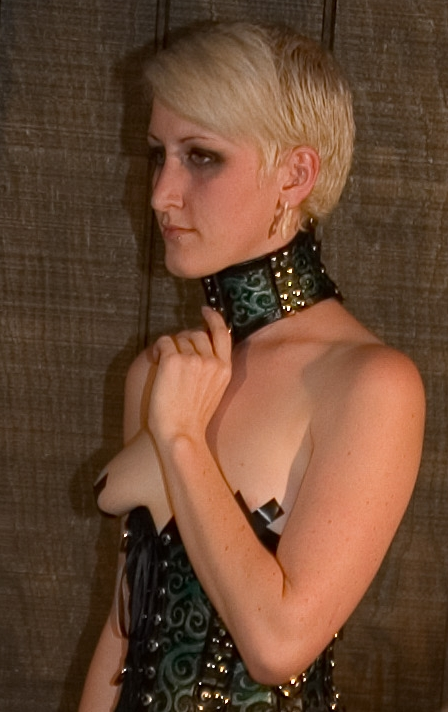
BDSM neck collar and corset

== See also ==
- Bralette
- Bustier
- Corset controversy
- Dudou, a Chinese undershirt sometimes known as a "corset"
- Fainting room
- Fetish clothing
- Gibson Girl
- Tightlacing
- Waist cincher
