= Sweater design =

Design of knitted sweaters

Sweater design is a specialization of fashion design in which knitted sweaters are designed to fulfill certain aesthetic, functional and commercial criteria. The designer typically considers factors such as the insulating power of the sweater (and its resulting warmth for the wearer); the fashion of its colors, patterns, silhouette and style lines, particularly the neckline and waistline; the convenience and practicality of its cut; and in commercial design, the cost of its production and the profitability of its price point. Sweater designs are often published in books and knitting magazines. Sweater design is an old art, but continues to attract new designers, such as Nicky Epstein and Meg Swansen.

== Criteria ==
The aim of sweater design is a sweater that fulfils certain criteria. The primary criterion is that its intended wearer wants to wear it and, in case of commercial sweater design, is willing to buy it at a commercially feasible price point. General secondary criteria include

- the insulating power, material and breathability of the sweater should make its intended wearer physically comfortable;
- the sweater should be appropriate for the occasion in which it will be worn;
- makes its intended wearer feel fashionably attractive;

To satisfy these secondary criteria, the designer has several tools at their disposal, such as yarns, colors, patterns, textures, necklines, hemlines, sleeve shapes, style lines, pockets and embellishments, as well as the fit of the garment to its intended wearer, the silhouette.

- For commercial sweater design, the production of the sweater must also be inexpensive, lest the price point be too high and make the sweater undesirable. This is generally done by simplifying the design so that it can be made by machine; more complicated commercial designs are generally hand-knit in pieces that are then stitched together. For example, the separate pieces of the hand-knit sweaters found in stores are generally knit and assembled in different villages in China.

Despite the wealth of design techniques and studies of successful designs, the primary criterion (that the sweater be desired) is not always achieved, often due to factors beyond the designer's control including serendipity.

== Functional role as criterion ==
Sweaters are worn in various circumstances. For example, while some sweaters are worn at fancy dress occasions, others are worn to work, to religious services, in sporting or outdoors events such as hiking and camping. Similarly, the choice of a sweater can vary with different climates and different seasons, even with different times of the day. The sweater designer will generally target a particular occasion and temperature, e.g., a bulky, cabled, long-sleeved woolen seater for camping versus a refined, elegantly simple, short-sleeved cashmere sweater for white-collar work.

== Comfort criterion ==
Comfort is paramount; the sweater should make the wearer feel at ease, in the most general sense. The temperature should be right, the fabric should "breathe" and should not irritate the skin. The sweater should hang right and not need constant adjustment; It should fit well and allow for customary motion without binding (e.g., at the armholes). Finally, a sweater should not make the wearer feel uncomfortable because of its "cut" (e.g. showing bra straps or too much cleavage) or general style (e.g., colors/patterns that the wearer feels are inappropriate).

== Fitting a sweater ==
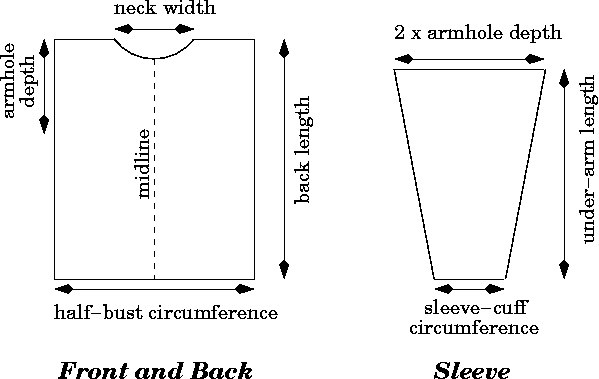
A simple sweater pattern with drop shoulders and cylindrical torso.

The fit of a sweater affects its comfort, its attractiveness and, sometimes, its practicality (e.g., dangling sleeves can fall into food or get caught on hooks).

The simplest sweaters (drop sleeve, cylindrical) require six measurements:

- circumference around the bust/chest (widest point)
- circumference (or width) of the neck
- under-arm length (armhole to sleeve-cuff hem)
- circumference of the arm at the sleeve-cuff hem
- back length (vertical distance from back of the neck to lower hem)
- armhole depth (vertical distance from bottom of armhole to lower hem)

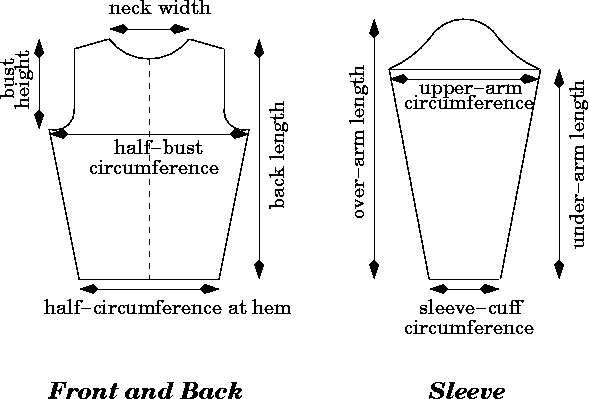
Sweater with tapered torso and set-in sleeves.

A few more measurements usually produce a well-fitted sweater:

- circumference at the lower hem
- over-arm length (shoulder to sleeve-cuff hem)
- circumference of the upper arm near the armhole
- bust height (vertical distance from back of the neck to bust line)
- shoulder width (horizontal distance between bony shoulder points, measured across back)

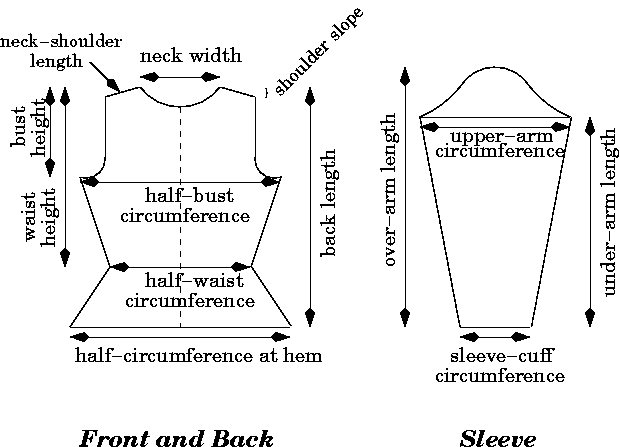
Sweater with a waistline and set-in sleeves.

For a more tailored look, even more measurements are necessary

- slope of the shoulders (vertical distance from base of neck to shoulder-point line)
- neck-shoulder length (horizontal distance from base of neck to shoulder point)
- circumference at the waist, the point of largest inward or outward curvature
- waist height (vertical distance from back of the neck to waist line)

Ideally, these measurements will be taken directly from the intended wearer, since bodies are idiosyncratic and these measurements may vary independently of one another, e.g., the bust measurement does not determine the waist or hip measurements, just as the height does not determine the arm length or shoulder width. Alternatively, the body measurements may be estimated from clothing that fits the wearer well. As a last resort, standard measurements such as EN 13402 or US standard clothing sizes may be used.

Of course, a sweater need not conform exactly to the wearer's body. Ease may be introduced to make the sweater larger than the body (oversized), typically by increasing the circumference measurements by 2-6 inches. Different amounts of ease can be introduced at different points to give the sweater a distinctive silhouette. For example, a "Gibson-girl" sleeve is produced by adding much ease to the upper arm and none to the lower arm, whereas the reverse is true for "bell" sleeves (also called "bishop" sleeves). Similarly, the bodice can fit loosely in the bust and tightly at the waist, or the reverse. Negative ease (i.e., subtracting from the body measurements) is also possible to achieve a very close-fitting look, but more than 2 inches is not recommended.

By making the sweater match the desired measurements, an excellently fitting sweater can be made. The width of a knitted piece at a given height should equal the corresponding circumference; for example, if the desired bust circumference is 38", then the front or back width at that height should be 19" each. The width of the upper sleeve (just before the sleeve cap, if any) should likewise equal the desired circumference of the upper arm.

Having determined the size and shapes of the knitted pieces, the number of stitches in a row is given by the desired width multiplied by the knitting gauge (e.g., 5 st/inch). Similarly, the number of rows in a column may be determined by multiplying the desired height by the vertical gauge (e.g., 3 rows/inch).

== Shaping ==
The human body has curvature, but woven fabric is flat and has little elasticity. To produce curvature in a smooth (unruffled) woven fabric, it is necessary to subtract or add wedges of fabric. Positive curvature (cupping, such as is needed at the bust point or over the rear) is produced by subtracting a wedge (a dart) with the point of the dart almost at the point of desired maximum curvature. The greater the angle of the wedge, the greater the local curvature. (The orientation of the dart is unimportant for the curvature, so it can be chosen to accentuate a style line of the garment.) Similarly, negative curvature (ruffling/saddle-shaping, as at a skirt hem, lower back or under the bust) is produced by adding a wedge (a flare). Although the base of individual wedges usually lies on a seam, sometimes wedges occur in pairs (diamonds) that are independent of the seams. Subtracting a diamond-shaped dart produces positive curvature at the outer points of the diamond, and negative curvature at the middle points that are brought together (good for the bust or back). Conversely, adding a diamond-shaped gusset produces negative curvature at its tips and positive curvature at its middle (useful in designing stuffed animals). Sometimes, the sharp, angular edges of the wedges are softened to form continuous princess seams.

Since knitted fabric is generally elastic, it conforms readily to the wearer's body without shaping. However, some shaping may be necessary when the knitted fabrics are unusually stiff (e.g., thick cable designs or heavily overstitched designs) or in regions of high curvature (e.g. sock heels). Ironically, shaping is much easier and less obvious with knitted fabrics than with woven cloth. Instead of cutting out wedges and sewing the edges together, knitters can add or subtract stitches; work short rows; or, most subtly of all, change the needle size to produce smaller/larger stitches in the desired "wedge" region.

== Choosing the yarn ==
The choice of yarn affects the comfort of the sweater, since it affects its warmth, weight and ability to "breathe" (air exchange). Some yarns will also produce itching or even allergic reactions in some wearers.

The yarn affects the bulk and drape of the knitted fabric, as well as the visibility of stitches. Complicated stitch patterns are best seen with a smooth, highly spun yarn and may be invisible with "furry" yarns such as mohair or novelty yarns.

The washability of yarn affects its practicability. Thus, sweaters knitted for young children are usually knitted in acrylics, which are light in weight and washable.

The yarn will also determine the lifetime of the sweater (in general, highly spun yarns suffer less wear with time) and how well it will retain its shape (elastic yarns like wool are better than non-elastic yarns like cotton or silk).

== Choosing colors ==
The choice of colors is critical to the design of a sweater.

The simplest choice is to use multiple shades of a single color (e.g., various shades of blue), perhaps accented with a contrasting color (e.g. flecks of yellow). The arrangement of shades on the sweater can have a significant visual effect, due to the principle of chiaroscuro; dark shades tend to recede and be smaller, whereas light shades advance and seem larger. For example, vertical stripes with a light color in the middle and dark colors on the sides have a slimming effect. Psychologically, bright colors tend to be associated with straightforward, innocent or extroverted personalities, whereas darker shades are associated with more thoughtful, experienced and introverted personalities.

The "temperature" of a color also affects its perceived depth. Warm colors have red or yellow tones (including orange and yellow-green) and are associated psychologically with warmth and energy. Cool colors have more bluish undertones (including purples, aquas and greens) and are associated psychologically with serene, calm personalities. Warm colors tend to advance relative to cool colors, when both are presented simultaneously.

Contrasting colors may be chosen in various ways. A common choice is to take a complementary colors from one of the several color wheels (e.g., blue and orange, green and red), or to choose a pairing that occurs in nature, e.g., yellow and red.

== Choosing shapes ==
The designer has many choices for how to shape the sleeve length and cap, waistline/hemline and neckline/collar; these various choices and their visual effects are described in their individual entries. The overall shape (silhouette) of the garment is defined by the ease introduced at various points, as described above under "Fitting". In addition, a sweater may have ornamental lines/curves, even images. In general, these lines are chosen to achieve a balanced look; for example, well-chosen style lines can help compensate for body lines considered too long or too angular or too short or too rounded. However, visual effects may be idiosyncratic, and the knitter is encouraged to experiment.

== Choosing an overall pattern ==
The scale of the overall pattern relative to the size of the whole sweater is a key variable in the "look" of the sweater. Large overall patterns eliminate the need for accent patterns (see next section) but may be too bold for some wearers. A small, fine pattern makes an excellent background for accent patterns, but may not be visible with a particular yarn, or may be too retiring for some wearers.

== Choosing accent patterns ==
A sweater done uniformly in the same pattern overall is relatively simple and understated, which may be the desired effect. However, it is more usual to decorate the sleeve cuffs and either the neckline or the lower hemline with an accent pattern. The accent band can be rather wide (often ~1/3 of the total length) and its boundary can be straight or wavy/serrated.

Smaller boundaries (such as collars, tops of pockets, central seam in cardigan) may receive special ornamentation as well, e.g., cabling along its edges.

== Embellishments ==
There are many types of ornamental embellishments that can modify the overall look of the sweater.

Collars and lapels are perhaps the most visually obvious embellishments. They frame the face, neck and shoulders, and complement the neckline and armhole lines.

The choice of closures is an important practical consideration and can also help define the sweater's style. Buttons and zippers are the most common choices for sweaters, but frogs, ties and belts are also seen.

Shoulder pads and other shaping devices are uncommon, but can be included to define a particular silhouette.

The fabric of the sweater can be ornamented with various textures, such as gathers, ruffles, pleats, ruching and shirring. Ornamental patterns can be added using beads, buttons, sequins, bobbles, ribbons and knots, as well as appliqué or cordwork. Overstitching (also known as Swiss darning) and other embroidery techniques allow for many visual effects that cannot be made with normal knitting, e.g., a circle of successively interlocking stitches.

== See also ==
- Sweater
