= Ballerina neckline =

Wide, shallowly-curved neckline

In fashion, a ballerina neckline refers to the classic necklines styles on the dance attire, or leotards, worn by the dancers.

Popularized especially by designers and fashion icons of the mid-twentieth century, the term ballerina (or ballet) neckline can be construed in a variety of ways. Some classically styled or traditional leotards have a low, wide, vertically scooped neckline and others are cut in a high horizontal oval shape. Both styles may be accompanied by a very low scooped back opening.

Most often, a ballerina neckline is a relatively high cut horizontal oval shape intended to frame the collarbone. It is this particular oval shape that distinguishes the ballerina (or "ballet") neckline from a jewel neckline or a crew neckline, which are round. Similar neckline styles would be the bateau neckline (also known as a boat neck) and a scoop neck cut.

Currently, in the early 21st century, neckline styles on adult women's leotards and children's leotards include an array of variations on the classic necklines, including a front V-neck, front and back V-neck, or a sweetheart neckline with or without ruching at the bust.

== See also ==
- Ballet and fashion
