= Sweater =

Piece of clothing made out of knit or crocheted material

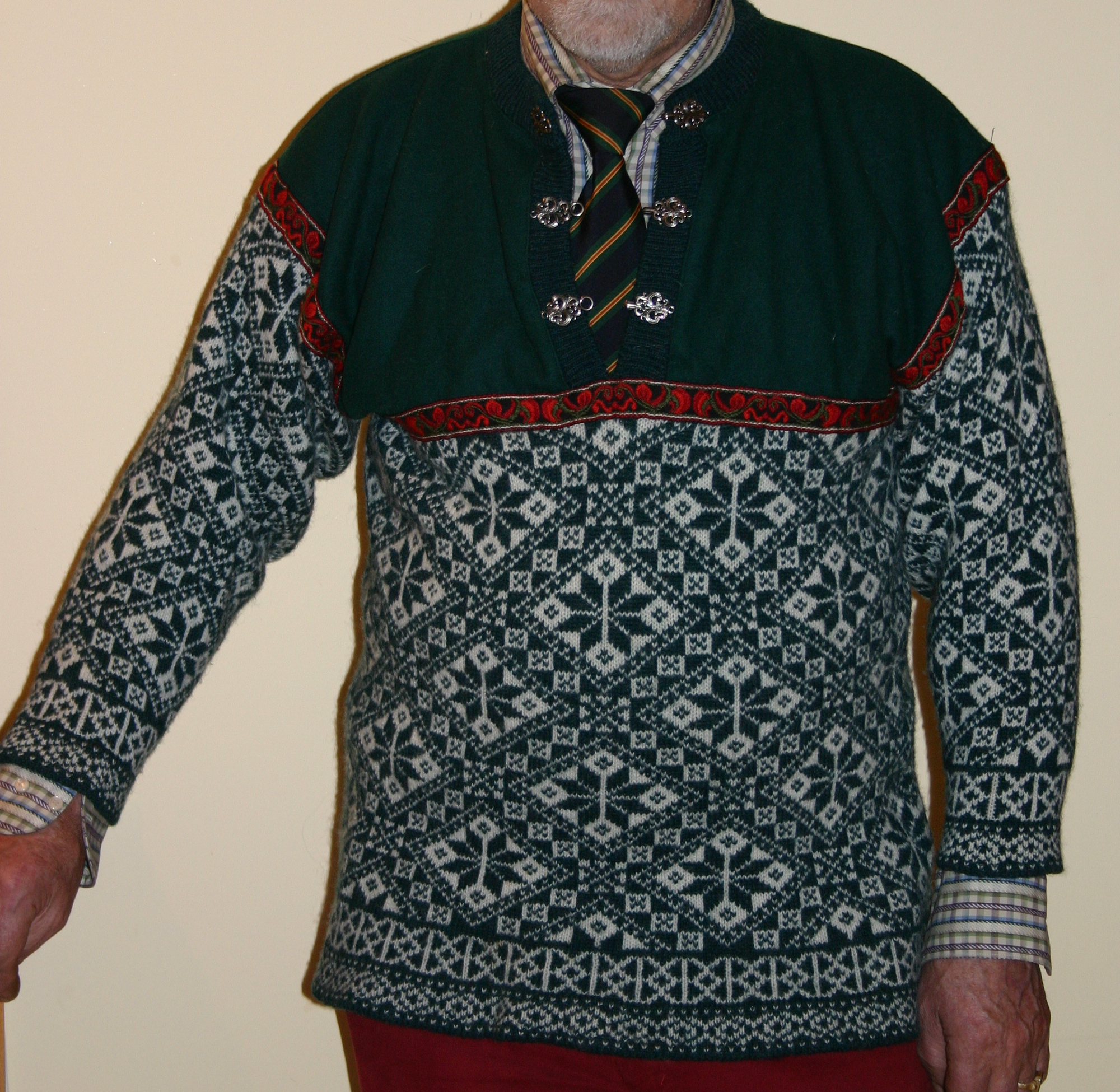
One from the Graham Leggate collection, a Norwegian selburose design

A sweater (North American English) or pullover, also called a jersey or jumper (British English, Hiberno-English and Australian English), is a piece of clothing, typically with long sleeves, made of knitted or crocheted material that covers the upper part of the body. When sleeveless, the garment is often called a slipover, tank top, or sweater vest.

Sweaters are worn by adults and children, often over a shirt, blouse, T-shirt, or another top, but sometimes next to the skin. Sweaters were traditionally made from wool but can now be made of cotton, synthetic fibers, or any combination of these. There are also seasonal sweaters, including the familiar holiday-themed Christmas sweater.

== Etymology ==
According to British dictionaries, "sweater" is used in British English in the same sense as in American English but "jumper" is commonly used instead (though some say that "sweater" is used for heavier ones worn for warmth). The Oxford English Dictionary states that in British usage, sweaters are always pulled over the head and jumpers are not necessarily, whereas most or all other British dictionaries disagree and say that sweaters are not necessarily pullovers or even say that jumpers are always pullovers, i.e. never open in front.

The Oxford English Dictionary gives "sweater" as appearing in 1882 and gives its definition as "A woolen vest or jersey worn in rowing or other athletic exercises, originally... to reduce one's weight; now commonly put on also before or after exercise to prevent taking cold. Hence a similar garment for general informal wear; a jumper or pullover"

According to most British dictionaries, British usage agrees with what American dictionaries describe as American English usage, according to which a sweater is either a pullover or a cardigan (which opens at the front). Almost all British dictionaries include cardigans as a type of sweater but at least one includes cardigans as a type of jumper (i.e. most British dictionaries consider "sweater" – and at least one considers "jumper" – to be a hypernym for both pullovers and cardigans). Colloquial and informal usage common in Britain is using the term “cardie” for a cardigan which usually refers to a button-front sweater.

== Types and design ==
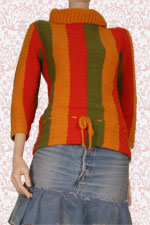
"Hot dog" sweater

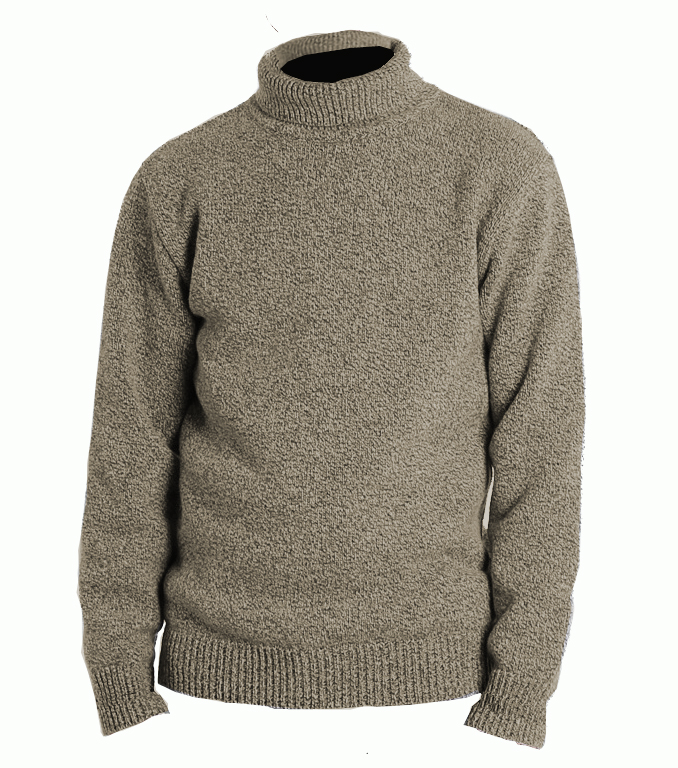
Turtleneck sweater

The term "sweater" is a catch-all for a variety of knit garments. Although the term often refers to a pullover, it can also refer to a cardigan, a garment that opens and fastens down the front. Within either group, there is a great variety of designs. Various necklines are found, although the V-neck, turtleneck, and crew neck are the most popular. The hemline is typically at hip height or slightly longer, just overlapping the waist of one's pants or skirt, but can vary significantly. It can range from just below the bust in women's garments to mid-thigh in either sex or even longer in a knitted variation of the poncho shirtdress. The sleeve length is also variable, ranging from full-length or three-quarters to short-sleeved, cap sleeves or sleeveless. The front seam or opening of a cardigan allows for further different styles, such as a surplice or a bolero jacket. All hems may have various types of borders, such as picots, ribbing, and frills.

Knitted fabrics are generally somewhat elastic and have a softer hand (feel or drape) than woven fabric. Sweaters that are more tightly fitted or have a soft drape may conform well to the body without requiring tailoring necessary in a woven garment such as darts, flares, and gores. Even when such shaping is used, it can be knit into the fabric itself, without requiring seams.

== Nomenclature ==
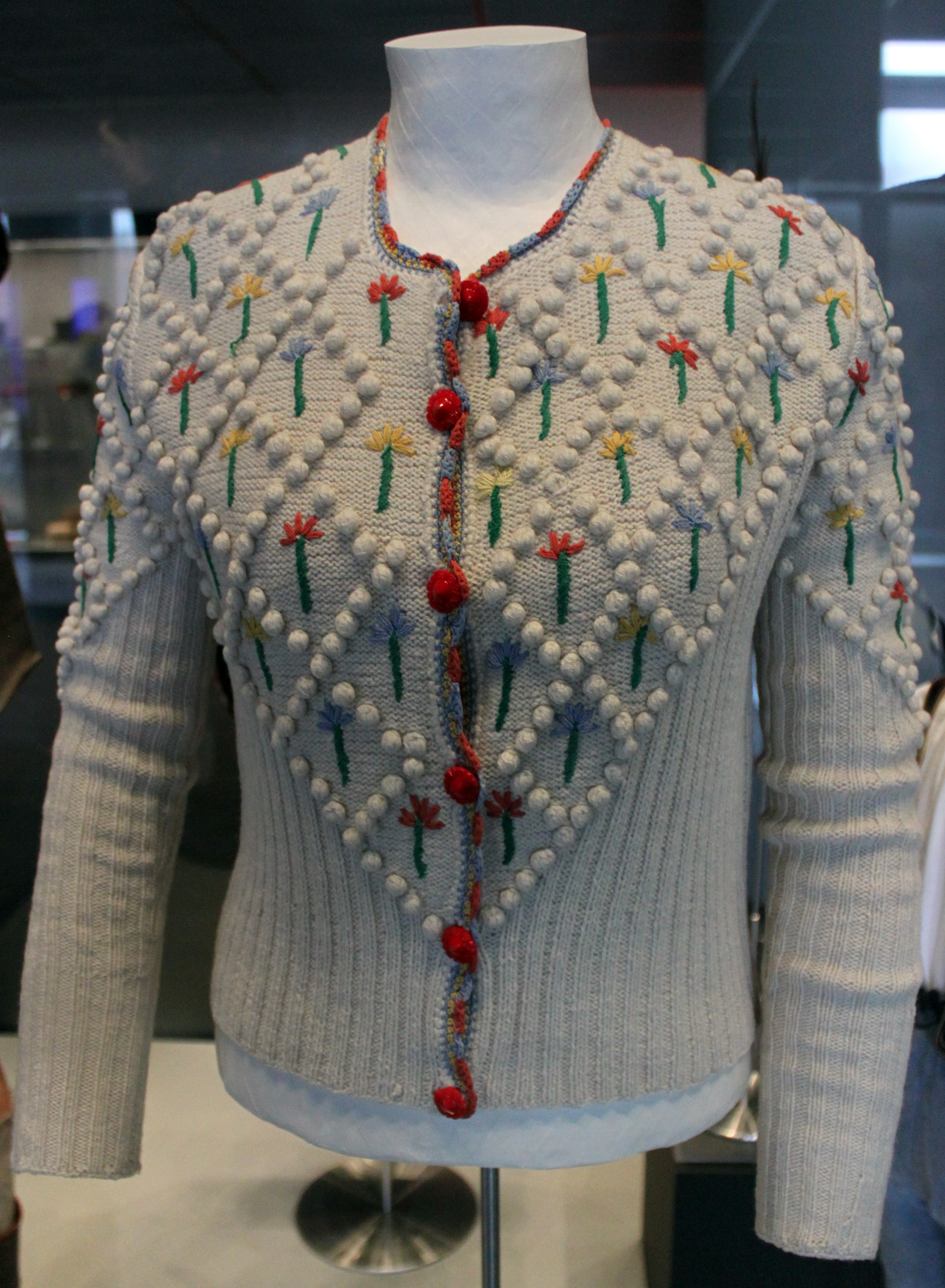
A cardigan

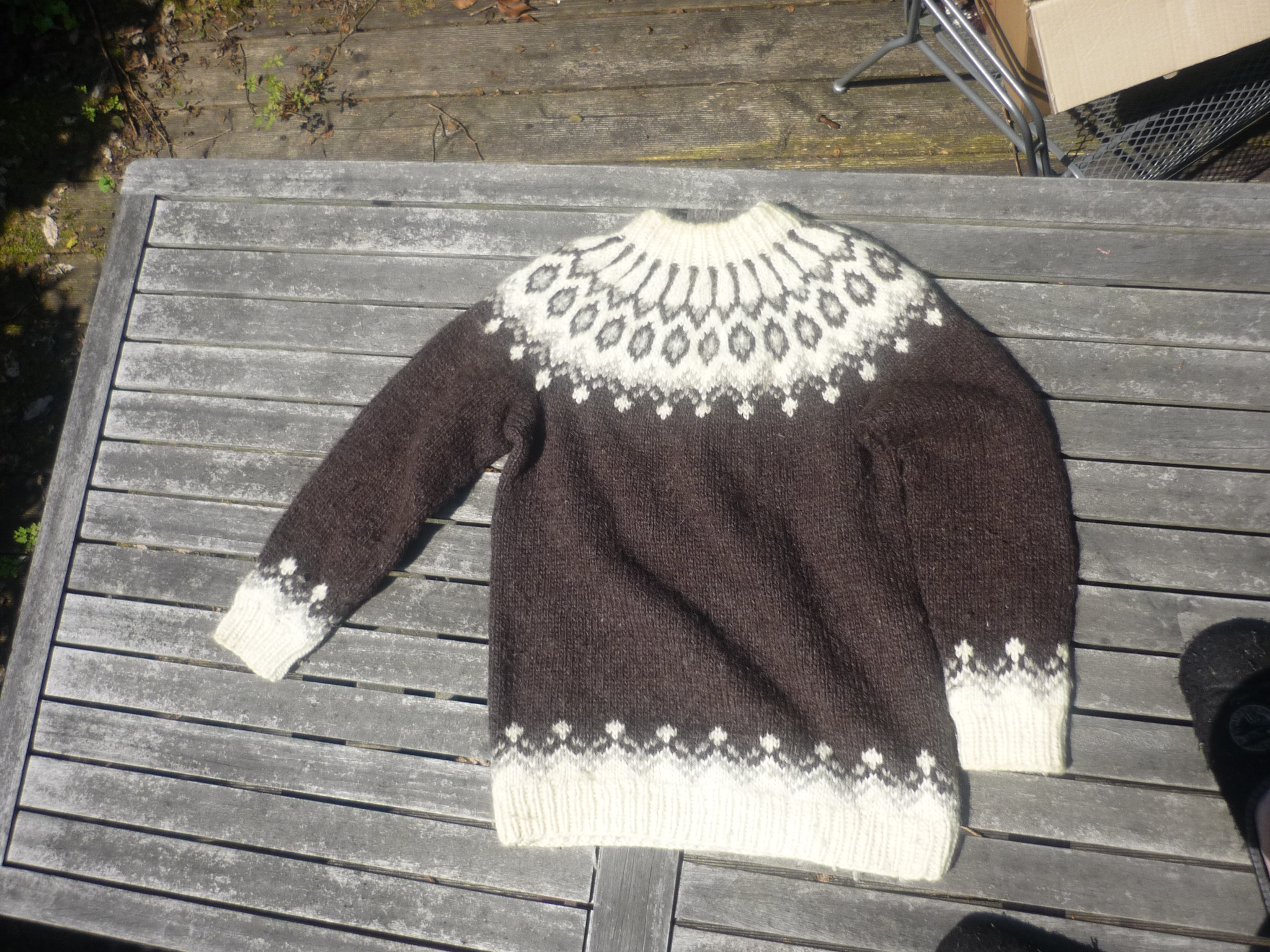
A pullover from Iceland (lopapeysa)

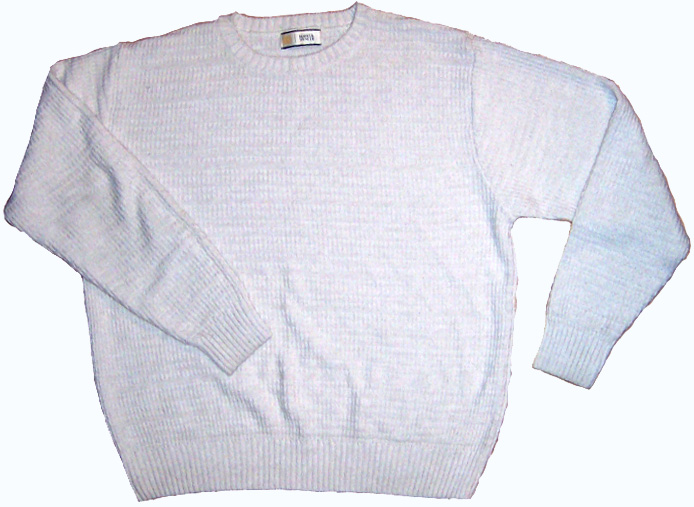
A jumper

A sweater with an open front fastened by buttons or a zipper is generally called a cardigan, but the nomenclature for other styles in different dialects can be quite confusing. In British English, a sweater may also be called a pullover, jumper, or jersey. In the United States, however, "jumper" refers to a style of women's sleeveless dress, worn over a blouse or shirt, and "jersey" refers to a knit shirt, especially if part of an athletic uniform. If sleeveless, such a garment may be called a "slipover" or "tank top" in British English, while "tank top" in US English refers to a sleeveless shirt or undershirt.

In the U.S. a sleeveless sweater may also be called a sweater vest, especially if it has a V-neck and somewhat formal appearance resembling a formal vest, a garment known as a waistcoat in the UK. In British English, "vest" refers to an undershirt. In South African English, a knitted sweater is always called a jersey, while sweater, when used, refers to a sweatshirt. In the sport of ice hockey, the top of a hockey player's uniform had traditionally been a sweater; and even though modern hockey uniform tops are more commonly a jersey they are typically referred to as a "hockey sweater," regardless of the style, but frequently, in the U.S. it is called a hockey "jersey".

In the U.K., a jersey, named for the British Crown Dependency of Jersey, which became a large exporter of knitted goods in the Elizabethan era, is usually close-fitting and machine knitted in contrast to a guernsey that is more often hand knit with a thicker yarn.

Article of Clothing	US	UK
Knitted garment covering torso and arms that is closed at the front	sweater, pullover	sweater, pullover, jumper, jersey
Knitted garment covering torso and arms that is open at the front	sweater, cardigan	sweater, cardigan, jumper
Women's sleeveless dress	jumper	pinafore
Cotton (or jersey) garment covering torso and arms that is closed at the front	sweatshirt	sweatshirt
Athletic shirt	jersey	shirt, kit (refers to full sports uniform)
Sleeveless knit garment	sweater vest, slipover	tank top, sleeveless pullover/jumper
Sleeveless undershirt	tank top	vest, singlet
Sleeveless formal garment	vest	waistcoat

See also:

- List of American words not widely used in the United Kingdom
- List of British words not widely used in the United States
- List of words having different meanings in American and British English: A–L
- List of words having different meanings in American and British English: M–Z

== Customary wear ==
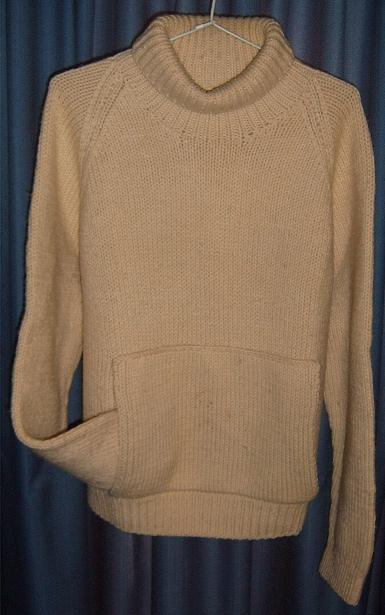
Seaman's jumper, woolen, hand-knitted

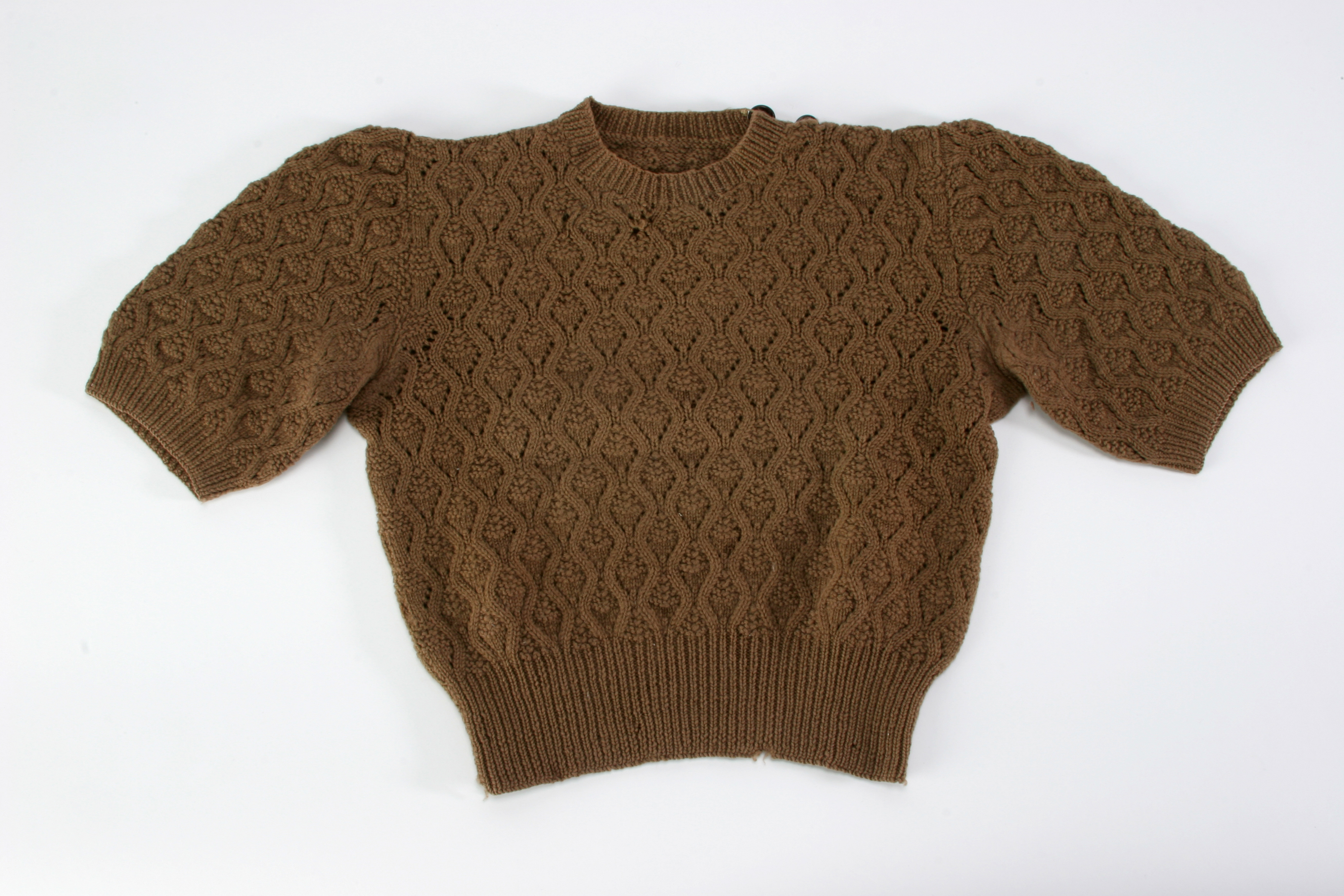
A traditional knit jersey

Thin sweaters may be worn tucked into the waistband of trousers; but otherwise, men's sweaters are worn untucked. Nonetheless, some individuals, including some television and film actors, have been known for wearing tucked-in sweaters.

Sweaters are a versatile item of clothing and can be worn on top of almost any outfit. Sports sweaters are often worn on tops of sports kit while traveling to or from a sports ground. Sweaters can be worn with a dress shirt underneath (and optionally a tie), which has the advantage of allowing the wearer to have the option of removing the sweater when it is uncomfortably warm and still looking presentable in many situations. Layering and the ease with which it allows for temperature regulation is a major benefit of the sweater as an article of clothing. Various methods have evolved for conveniently carrying a sweater, once removed. The three most common approaches are: around the waist (either loin cloth or knotted in front style) and over the shoulder.

In the late 20th century, the sweater increasingly came to be worn as an alternative to a shirt when finer materials made them more comfortable next to the skin.

Some people enjoy wearing Christmas-related sweaters around Christmas time to get into the festive spirit. Some women's sweaters are meant to be worn belted; a belt or drawstring is sometimes knitted into the sweater itself. Leggings are commonly worn with long sweaters or sweater dresses.

== Care ==
Sweaters are often maintained by washing or dry cleaning and the use of a lint roller or pill razor. But airing (and rinsing in pure water if necessary) wool sweaters is considered better than washing with soap or another detergent, especially when not all of the natural oil (lanolin) has been removed from the wool. The use of detergent is in fact detrimental because it removes the lanolin, which helps the wool to repel and shed dirt as well as water. In fact, sweaters made from unscoured wool, such as some Irish Aran jumpers, remain wearable even when wet.

== Ice hockey ==
The uniforms that present-day ice hockey players wear are referred to as "sweaters". This is because original uniforms were simply sweaters with the team's crest stitched on the front. However, as technology changed, so did the uniforms as actual sweaters absorbed too much moisture and became weighed down and cumbersome throughout the course of a game.

== See also ==
- Baja jacket
- Jacket
- Sweater curse
- Sweater design
- Sweatshirt
- Twinset
