= Neckline =

Shape or style of a garment at the neck

Styles of neckline

The neckline is the top edge or edges of a garment that surrounds the neck, especially from the front view. Neckline also refers to the overall visual line between all the layers of clothing and the neck and shoulders of a person, ignoring any unseen undergarments.

For each garment worn above the waist, the neckline is primarily a style line and may be a boundary for further shaping of the upper edge of a garment with, for example, a collar, cowl, darts, or pleats. In that respect it is similar to the waistline and hemline.

== Types ==
Necklines can be grouped into categories according to their shape and where they cut across the body.

=== Boat neck ===
The boat neck, also called the bateau neckline or Sabrina neckline, is a high, wide, slightly curved neckline that passes past the collarbones and hangs on both shoulders. It has one edge and is nearly linear. The portrait neckline is a variation of this.

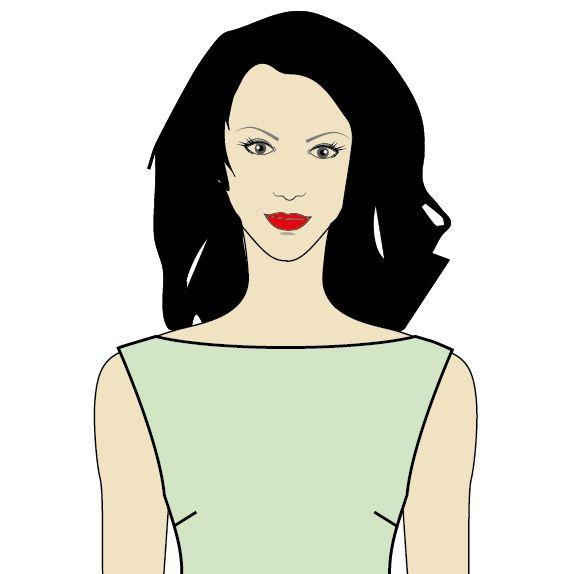
Boat neckline

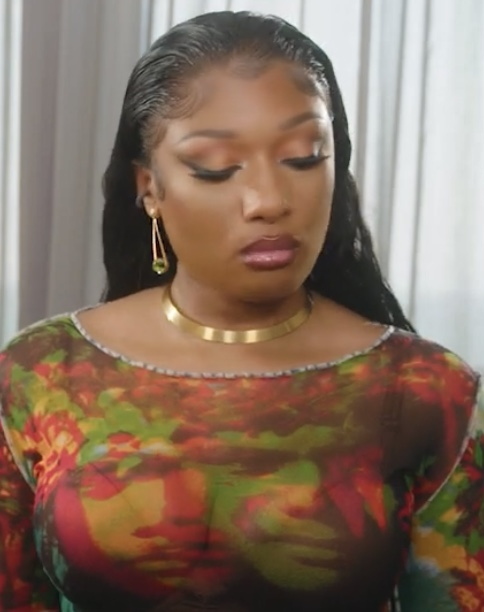
Megan Thee Stallion wearing a boat neck, 2021

=== Crew neck ===
This neckline is circular and sits at the base of the throat, with a rib knit band around the neck. It is commonly called the T-shirt neckline. It's functionally interchangeable with the jewel neckline, though jewel tends to refer to a neckline that does not include the rib knit band.

=== Deep or plunging neckline ===
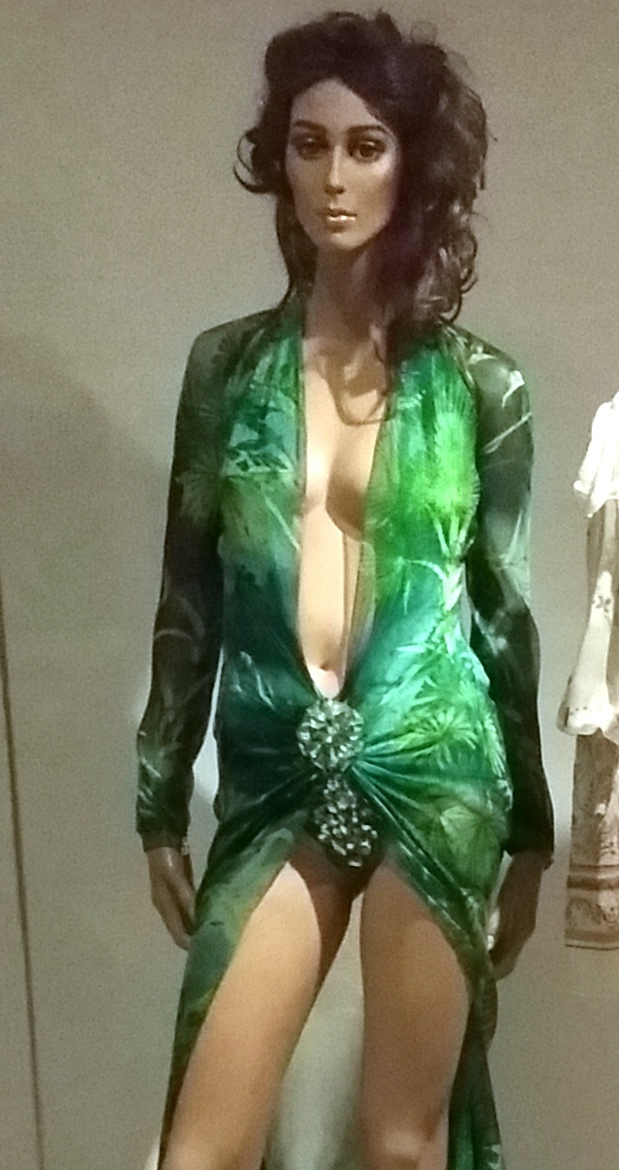
The green Versace dress

These are low necklines, in either V, U, or square shapes, that reveal some amount of cleavage. Evening gowns often have low necklines. In some cases, such as Elizabeth Hurley's famous black dress and the blue Prada dress of Lupita Nyong'o, these necklines will extend to the natural waistline.

One extreme example of a plunging neckline is the green Versace dress of Jennifer Lopez, which has a neckline that extends down past the navel.

=== Funnel neck ===
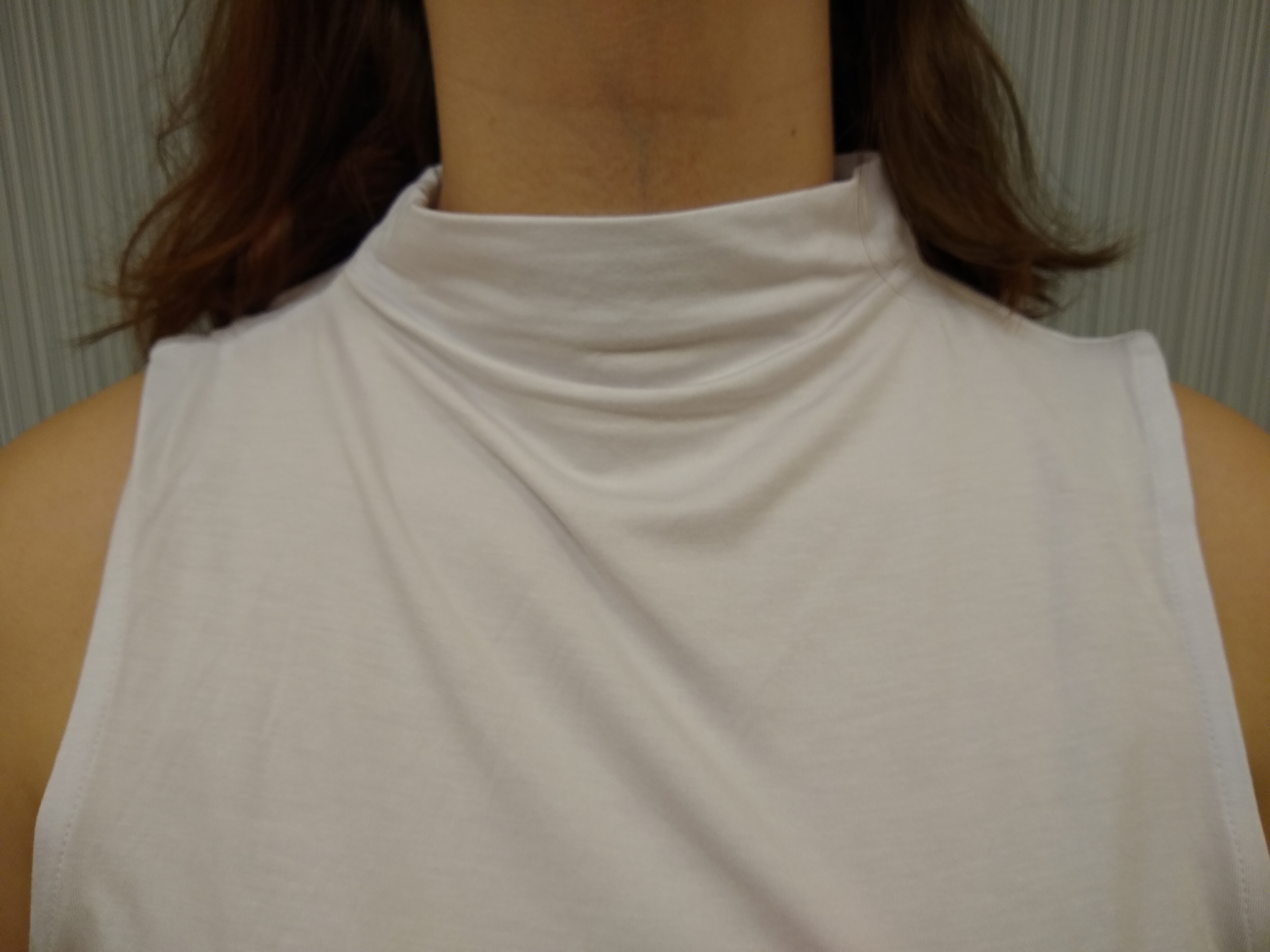
Funnel neck sleeveless top

The funnel neckline, sometimes called the built-up neckline, has fabric standing high and close to the neck, cut or knit in one piece with the torso rather than as an added collar.

=== Halter neckline ===
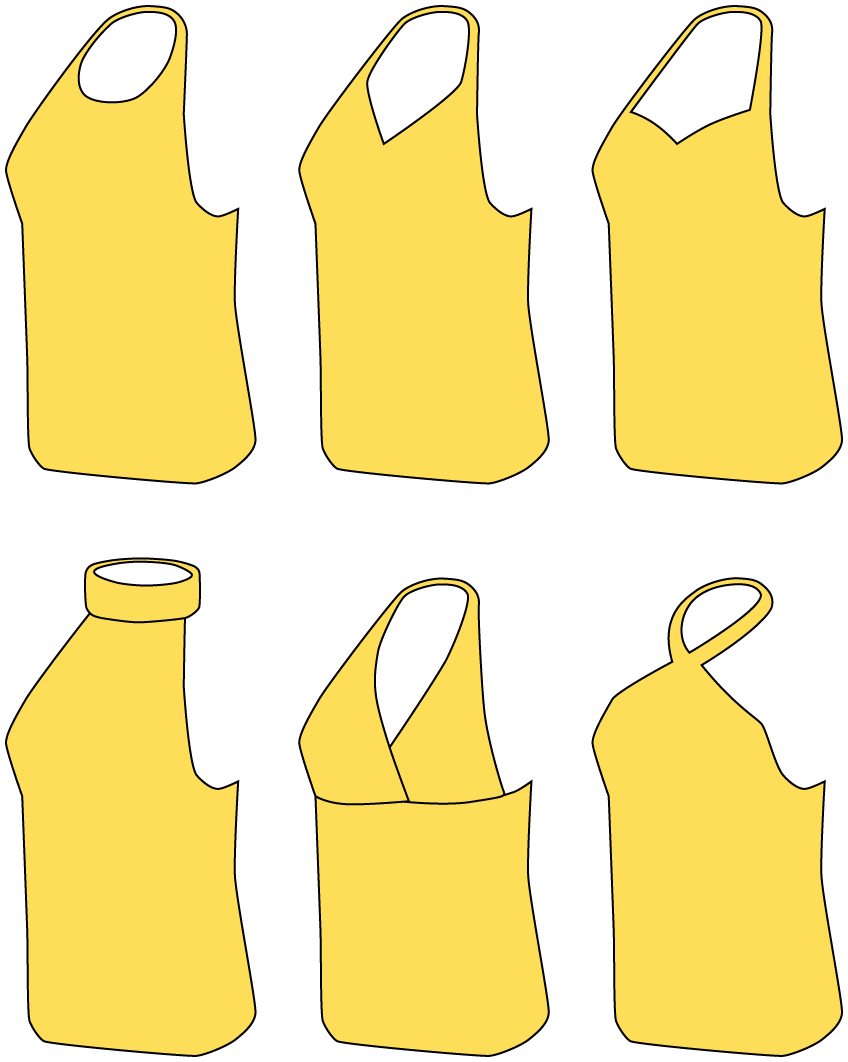
Common variations on the halter top

The Halter neckline is linear, featuring a V-neck or scoop front neckline with straps which either tie behind the neck, or wrap around and connect at the nape of the neck. This style hides cleavage and exposes the collarbone. The back is also generally exposed.

Yếm are a type of halter neck top. Jeanne Lanvin's Cyclone dress had a halter neckline.

=== Illusion neckline ===
The illusion neckline is a compromise between a low and high neckline. It combines a low, usually strapless, neckline with semi-transparent fabric (sheer fabric or lace) along the top part, thus creating a second, higher neckline. This neckline is often seen on traditional white wedding dresses.

=== Jewel neckline ===
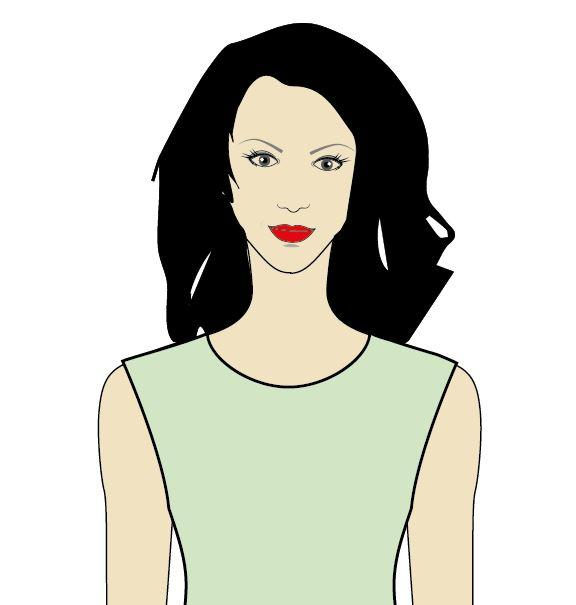
Jewel neckline

The jewel neckline is circular and sits near the base of the throat. It is sometimes used interchangeably with the term crew neck, though jewel tends to refer to necklines that do not include the rib knit band.

=== Keyhole neckline ===
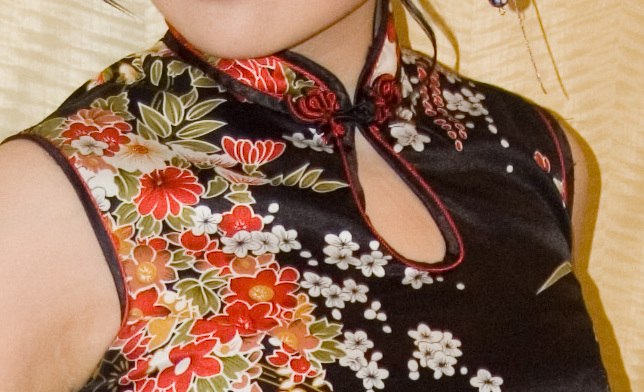
Keyhole neckline of a qipao

The keyhole neckline features a hole at the center, usually just below the collarbones. These are often similar to halter necklines, except that the converging diagonal lines meet in front of the neck, forming a "keyhole". The keyhole can be round, or wedge-shaped.

=== Off-the-shoulder ===
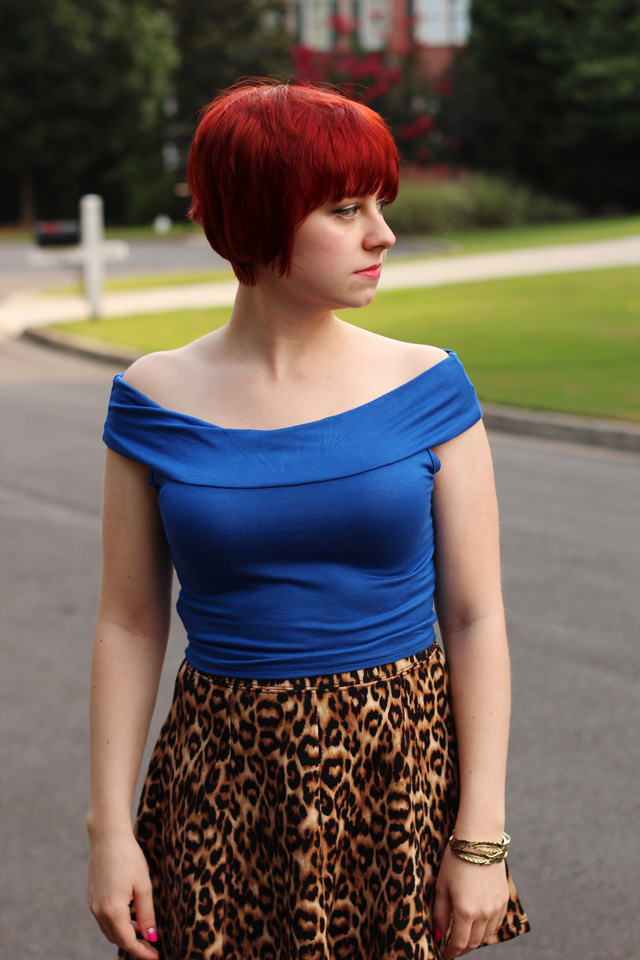
Off-the-shoulder top

The off-the-shoulder neckline, sometimes called the Carmen neckline, is similar to boat necklines but is significantly lower, below the shoulders and collarbone. Usually it passes over the arms, but in the strapless neckline style it may pass under the arms. The off-the-shoulder neckline reveals and accentuates the wearer's shoulders, collarbone, and neck.

The off-the-shoulder trend dates back to the Regency and Victorian Era. They were the height of fashion in the early to mid-nineteenth century. Charles Frederick Worth, the father of haute couture, designed many elaborate dresses, many of which featured bodices with off-the-shoulder sleeves and were very popular with prominent figures like Empress Eugenie. Then in 1960s, French actress Brigitte Bardot put her own twist on this style, wearing off-the-shoulder tops with everything from midi skirts to pants, reviving the style. The style icon made the off-the-shoulder style trendy again, and as a result it is sometimes called the "Bardot" style.

=== One-shoulder neckline ===
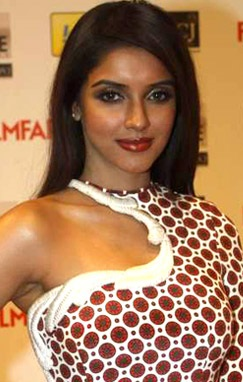
Actress Asin in a one-shoulder sari

These are asymmetrical linear necklines with one edge, which cut across the torso diagonally, usually from one shoulder to under the other arm.

=== Polo neck ===
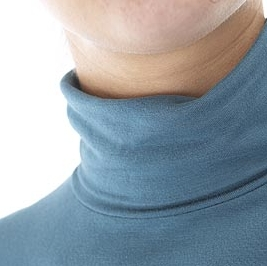
A folded turtleneck

These are high, close-fitting collars which wrap around the neck itself. They are most commonly used for jerseys and sweaters (also known as jumpers), and are often called turtlenecks. This is similar to the funnel neck, but is distinguished by the rib knit material used for the collar.

=== Portrait neckline ===
A portrait neckline is a V-neck with the edges of the V placed out at the points of the shoulders rather than closer to the neck. It's similar to the off-the-shoulder neckline, but the straps are higher on the shoulder. It can be combined with a surplice neckline.

Famous garments with portrait necklines include Jacqueline Bouvier Kennedy's wedding dress, and Princess Diana's revenge and Travolta dresses.

=== Scoop neck ===
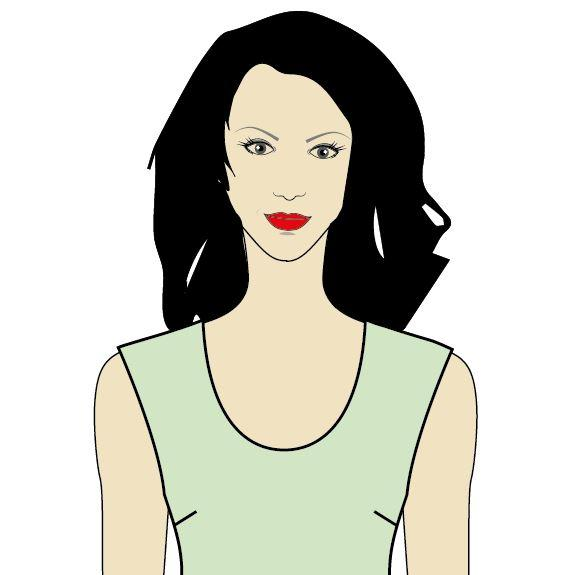
U or scoop neckline

These have a curved U-shape, with the arms of the U hanging on the shoulders. The depth of the U can vary, ranging from high to plunging.

Examples of garments with scoop necklines include Katharine Worsley's wedding dress and Sarah Ferguson's wedding dress.

=== Slit neckline ===
The slit neckline includes a narrow vertical opening, which is sometimes held together with a button and loop or other type of fastener.

=== Square neck ===
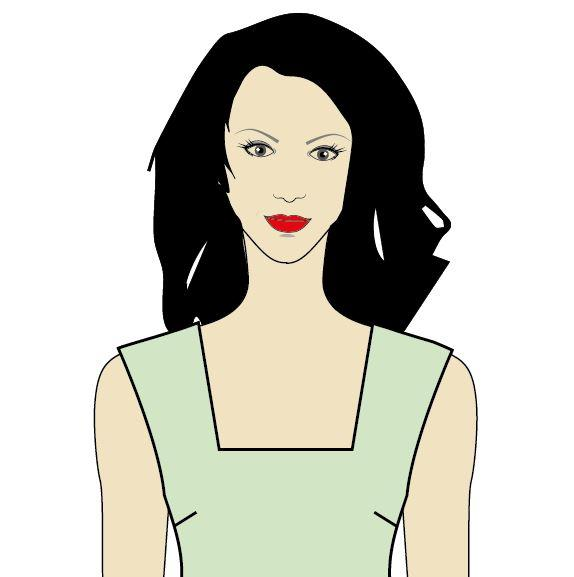
Square neckline

These are characterized by three linear edges, with the bottom edge meeting the side edges at right angles (or nearly right angles). The bottom edge cuts across the figure horizontally and the side edges pass over the shoulders. This neckline has been used in wedding dresses since at least the 1800s, and was popular for dresses in general in the 1870s.

A special variant of this is the slot neckline, in which the side edges are very close (roughly the width of the collarbone points), forming a narrow slot.

Gomesi have square necklines.

=== Surplice neckline ===
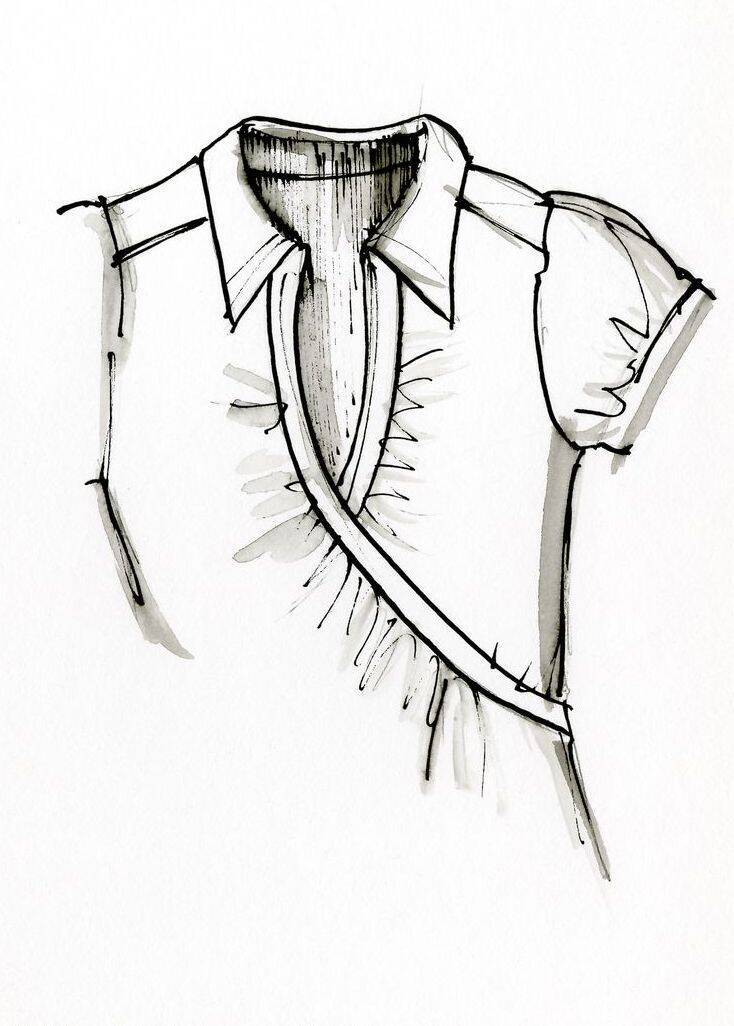
A surplice neckline

The surplice neckline wraps to form a V-shaped neckline in the front or back. These are similar to how a bathrobe's neckline is formed by one side of the garment overlapping the other. For a dress, the lower layer is usually sewn to the top layer just under the bust.

=== Sweetheart neckline ===
The sweetheart neckline has a curved bottom edge that is concave down and usually doubly scalloped, so that it resembles the top half of a heart. The side edges often converge on the neck, similar to halter necklines. Sweetheart necklines tend to accentuate the bosom of the wearer.

The strapless version of the sweetheart neckline is common in wedding dresses.

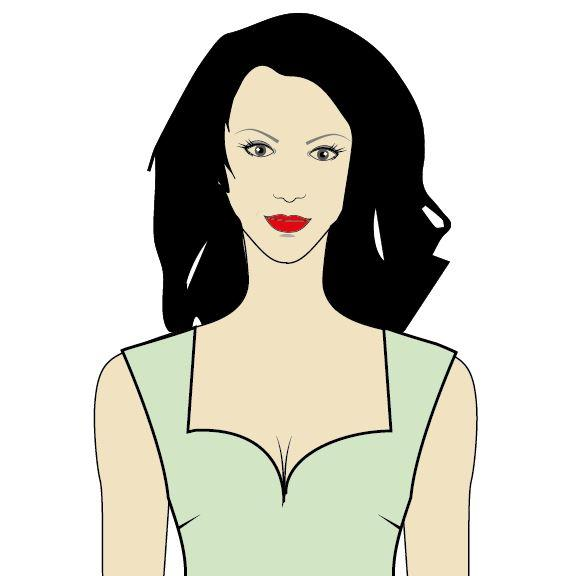
Sweetheart neckline

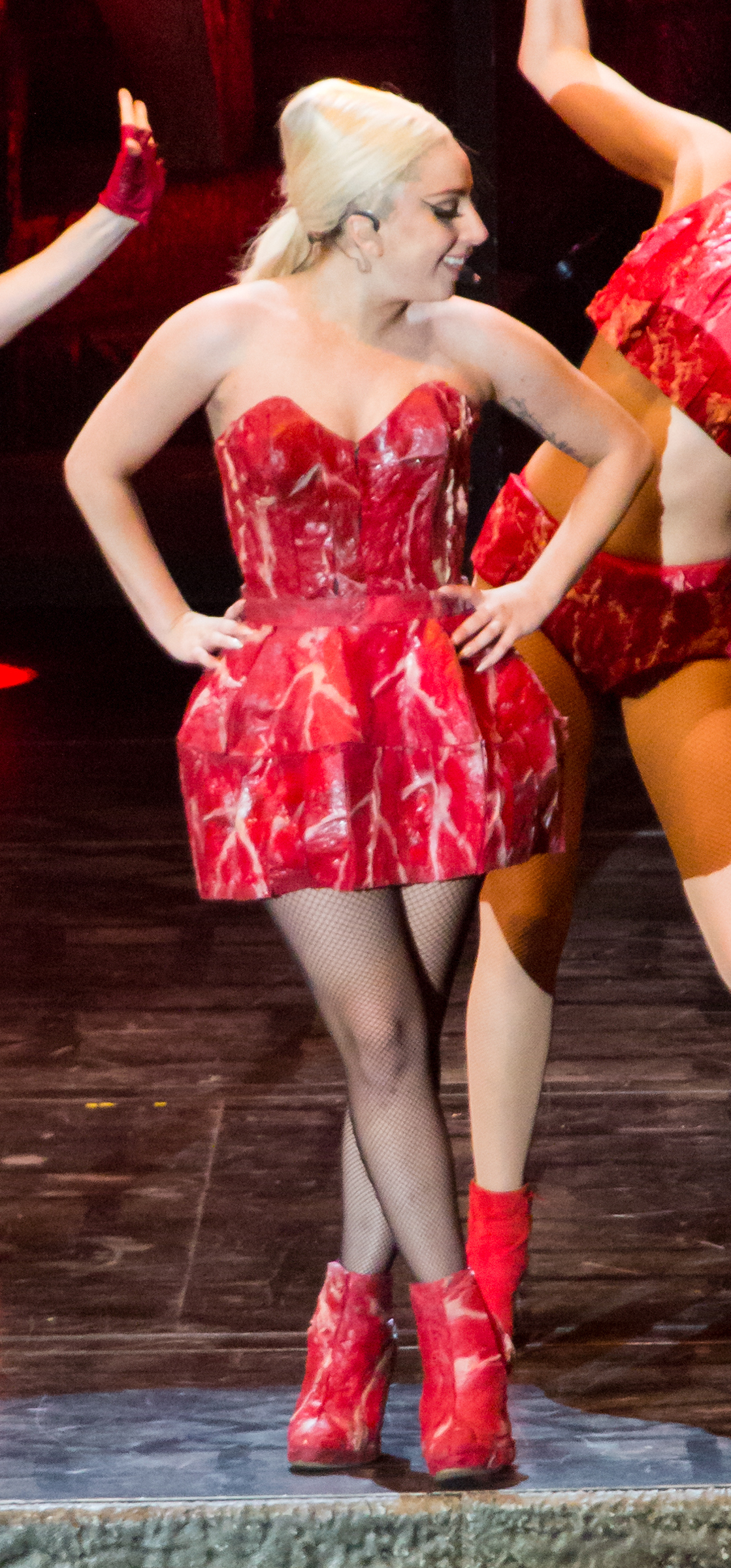
This faux meat dress, worn by Lady Gaga, has a strapless sweetheart neckline.

=== V-neck ===
The v-neck is formed by two diagonal lines from the shoulders that meet on the chest to create a V shape. The depth of the V can vary, ranging from high to plunging. The V may also be truncated by a small bottom edge, forming a trapezoid. Deeper v-necks may reveal cleavage and are used in dresses.

This style originated in the Middle East.

Types of v-neck tops include the Aloha shirt, cache-cœur, ghillie shirt, poet shirt, and wonju. Sweater vests and scrubs often have V-necks.

Famous v-neck garments include the Tarkhan dress, Princess Eugenie's wedding dress, Jacqueline Kennedy's apricot dress, Keira Knightley's green dress, Princess Louise of Wales' wedding dress, the Red Dress embroidery project, and Marilyn Monroe's white dress.

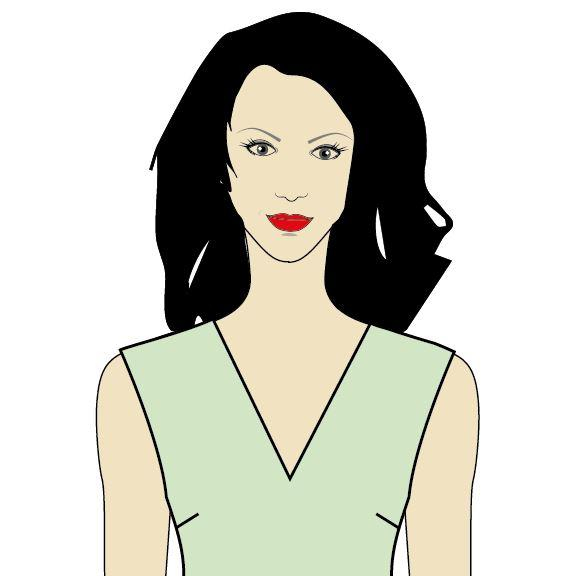
V neckline

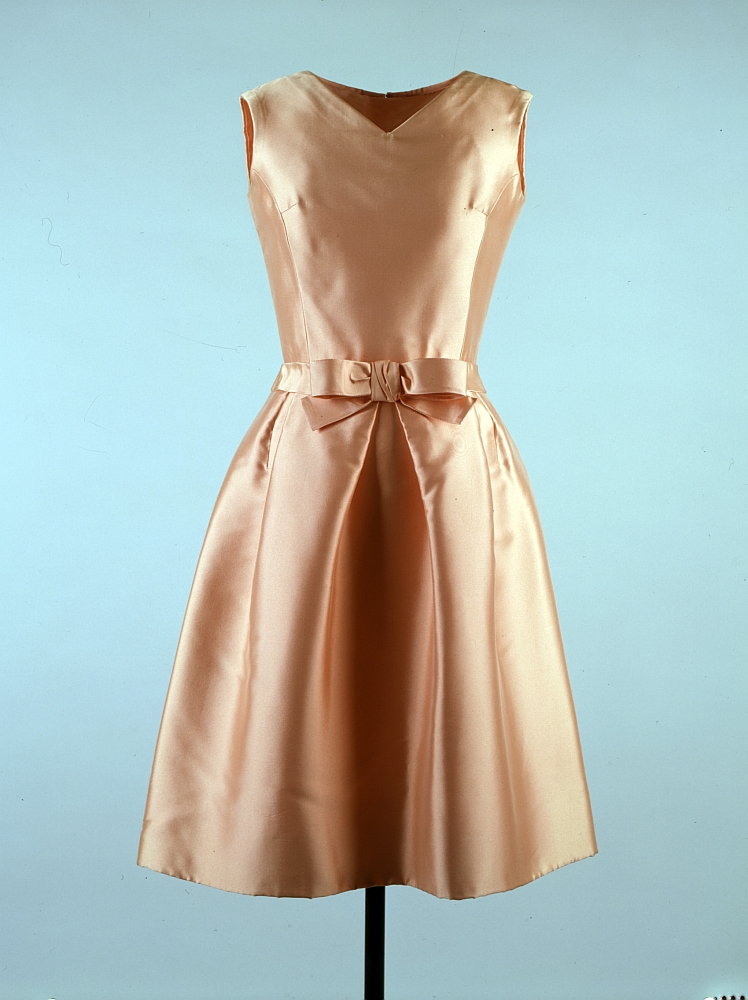
Jacqueline Kennedy wore this v-neck apricot dress during her 1962 goodwill tour.

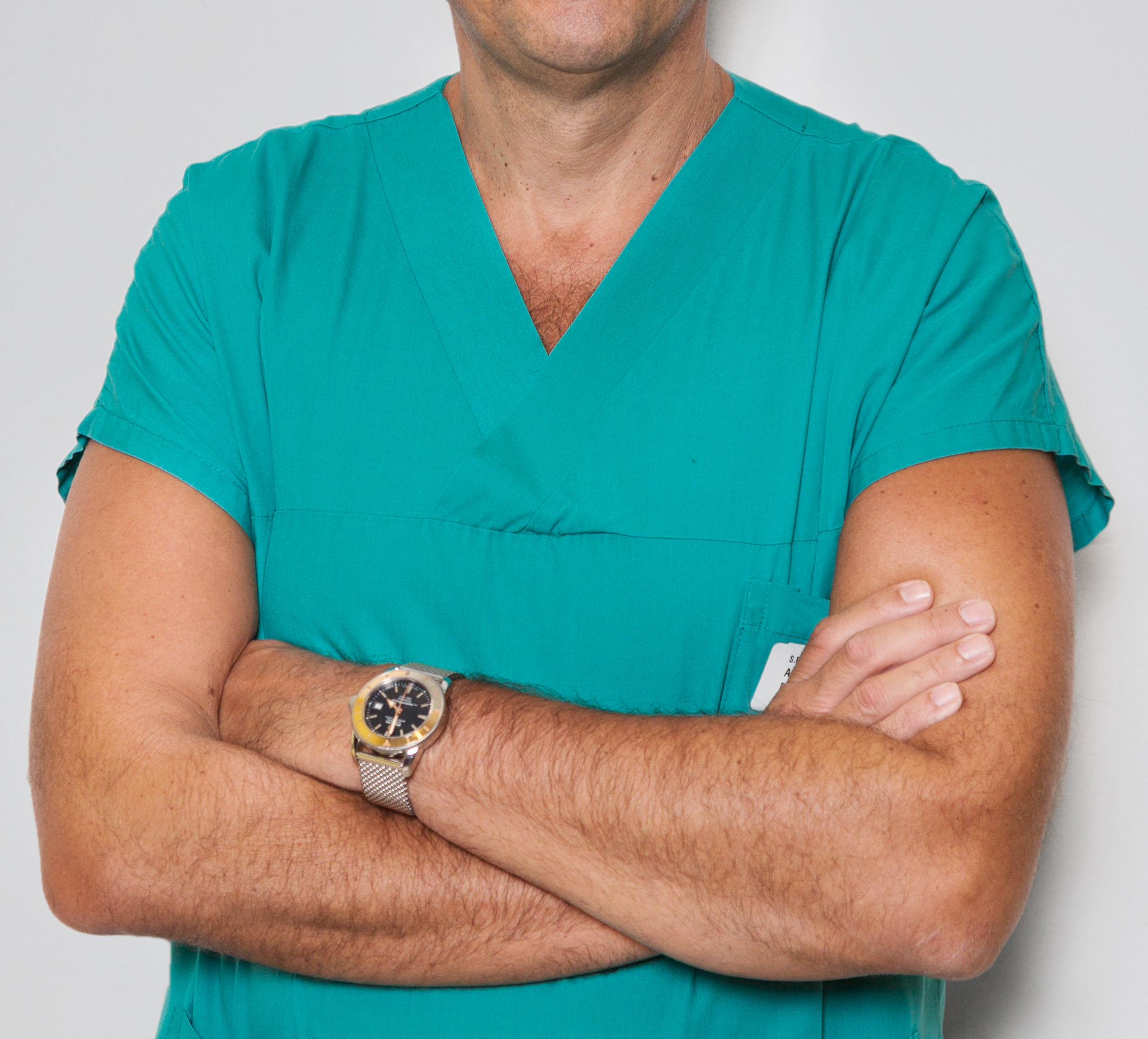
Scrubs often have v necklines.

== Modifications ==
The visual and physical shape of a neckline can be modified to create variants, or incorporate multiple necklines in a single outfit.

Layering can change the shape of a neckline. The layered items can include neckwear (such as a collar, kerchief, scarf, or necklace), or multiple tops with different necklines.

Another method involves overlaying the original neckline with a gauzy material such as tulle or lace. This method can create an illusion neckline.

Necklines can be decorated along the edges with jewels, scallops, picots, or ruffles.

The neckline can be a sharp edge of fabric or a more gentle cowl, and can also be accentuated by one or multiple patterns in the fabric itself.

Removing elements can also change a neckline. For example, many neckline types have strapless variants, which do not have straps but still maintain the other core elements of the neckline. The strapless sweetheart neckline, for instance, can create a more simplified heart shape without the added visual element of the straps. There are many variants of strapless dresses and tops (such as the tube top).

It is possible to modify the neckline of some wrap dresses simply by using a different wrapping method.

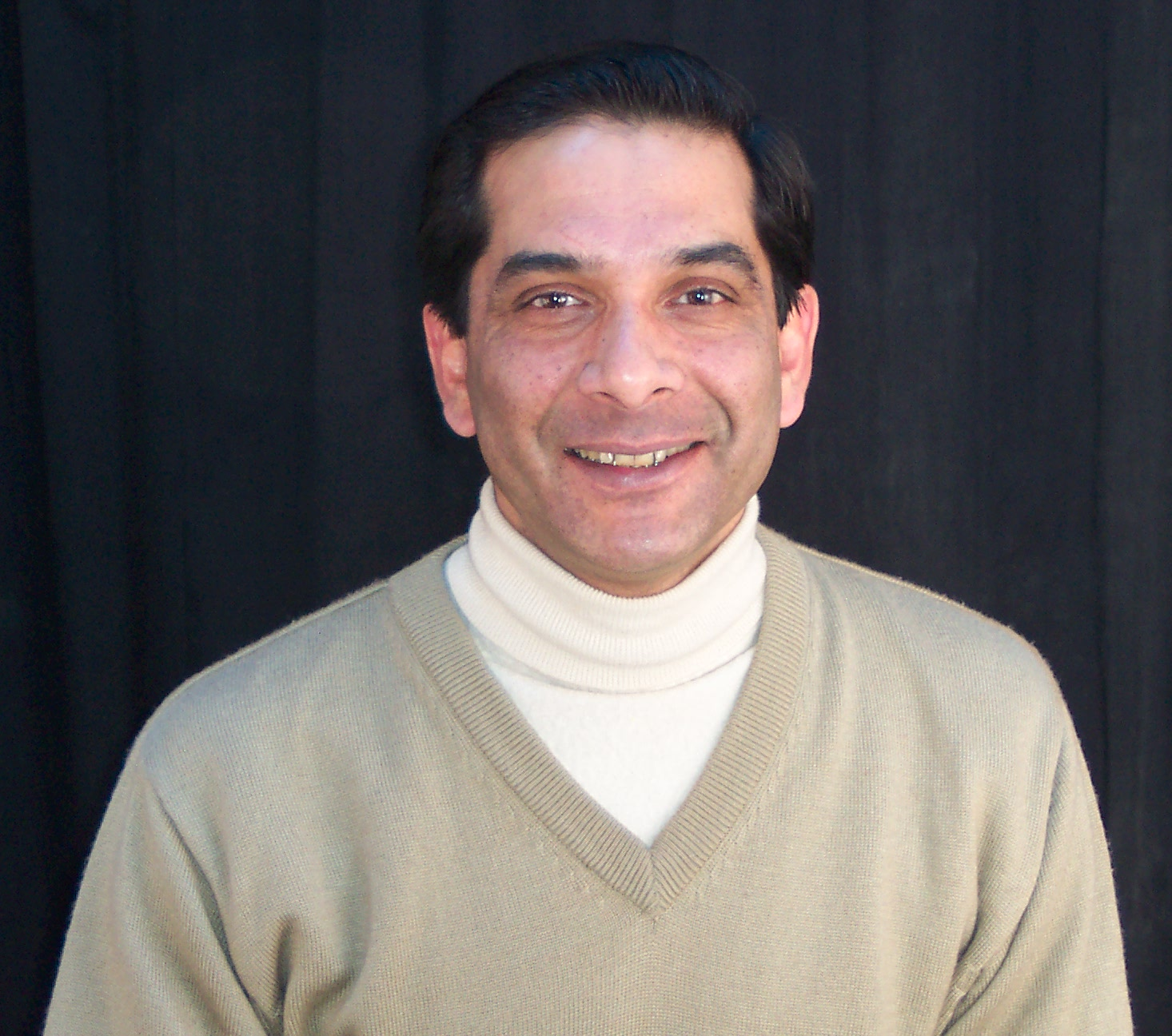
Layering garments can result in the appearance of multiple necklines. In this case, a V-neck sweater is overlaid on a turtleneck sweater, creating two visual lines while preserving the turtle neckline. (Photo shows Raaja Bhasin.)

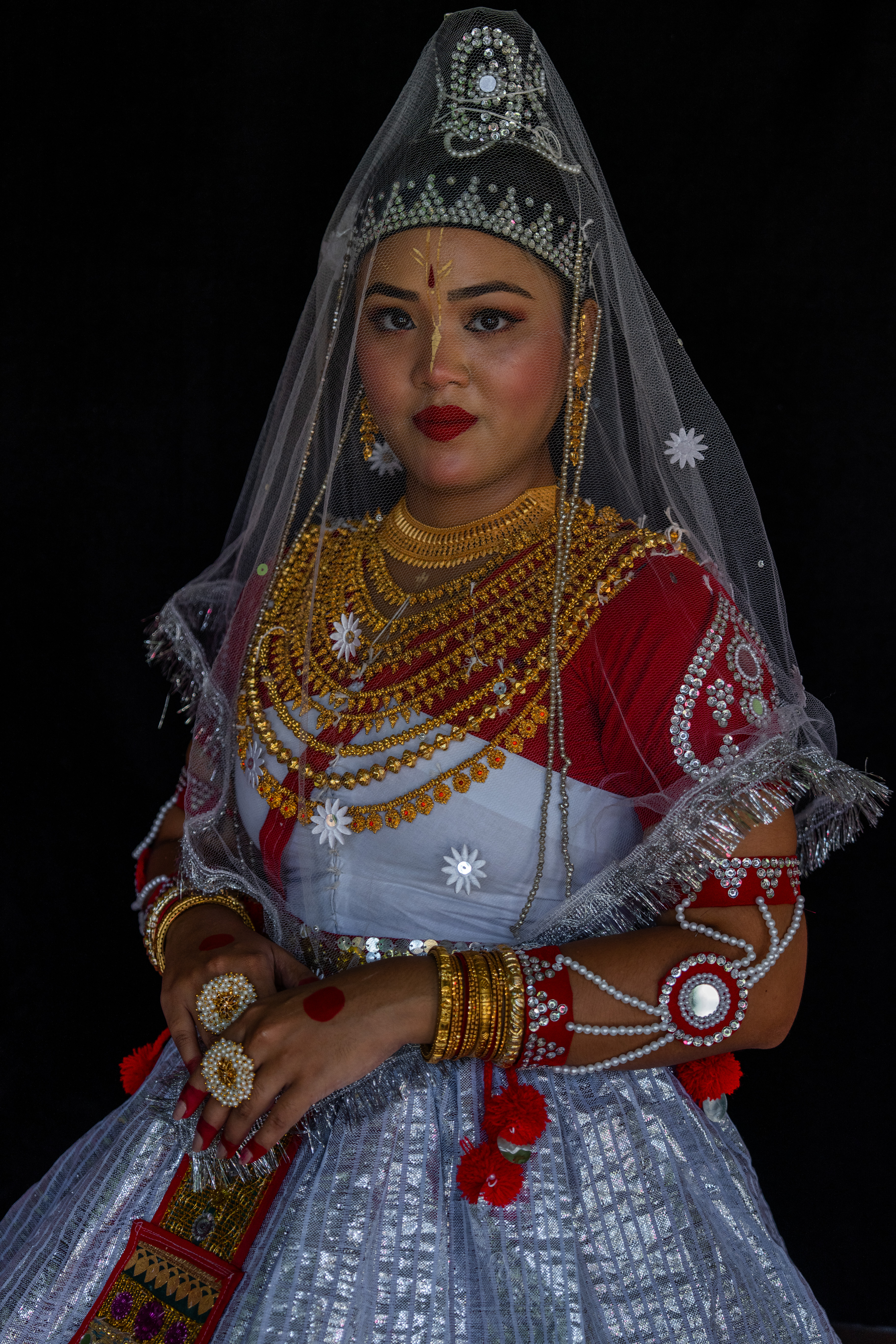
Adding jewelry can obscure or complicate the shape of a neckline. For example, this Meitei woman wears many necklaces as part of her traditional Bangladeshi Meitei clothing. These necklaces create the perception of a rounded neckline, despite the V-shaped neckline of the clothing underneath.

== Gallery ==
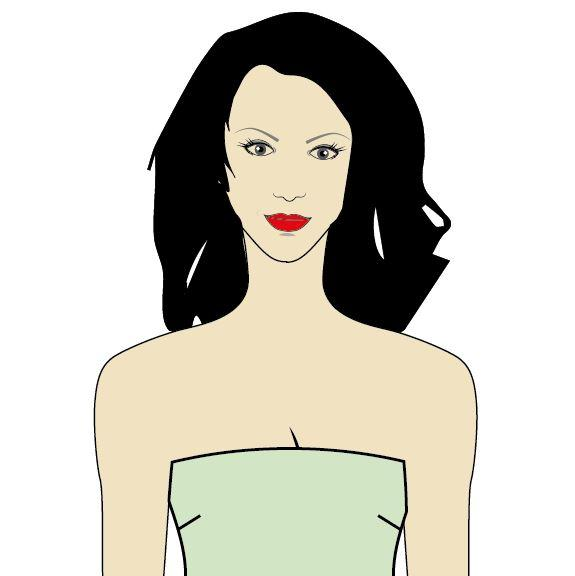
Strapless neckline

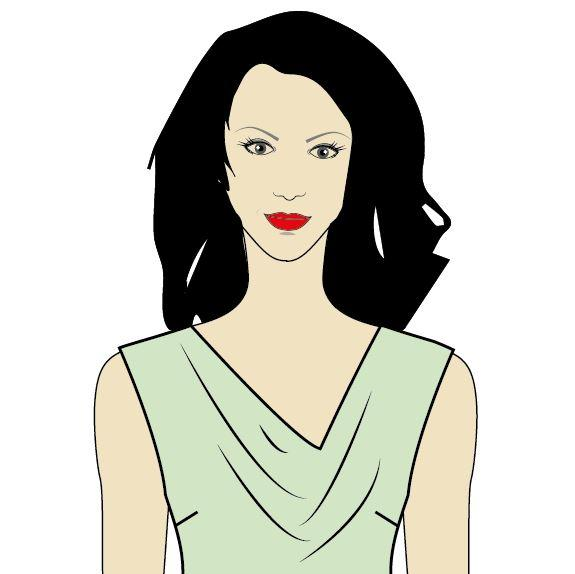
Waterfall or cowl neckline

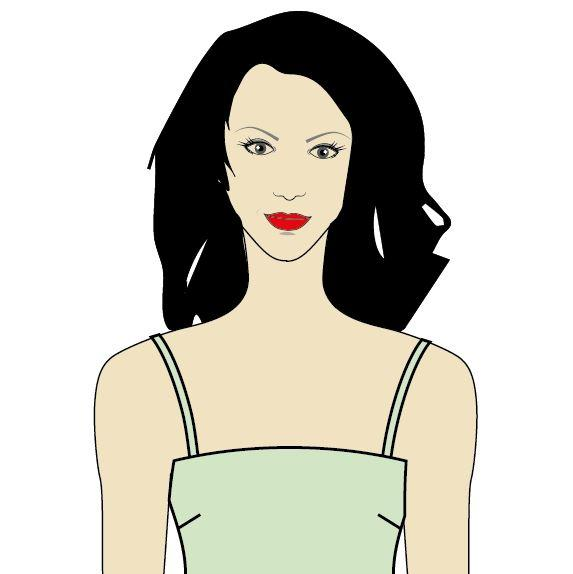
Spaghetti neckline

== See also ==
- Backless dress
- Balconette brassiere
- Ballerina neckline
- Bustline
- Dress code
- Facing (sewing)
- Fichu
- French curve
- Guimpe
- Hemline
- Henley shirt
- Low-rise (fashion)
- Midriff
- Princess line
- Stomacher (and jewellery)
- Sweater design
