= Cowl neck =

Woman's garment having a loosely draped fabric collar

A cowl neck is a neckline consisting of a loose draped fabric collar. The term can describe the neckline of a wide variety of garments, from the draped neckline of an evening gown to a raised neckline of knitwear similar to a turtleneck. The neckline was introduced in the 1920s by Madeleine Vionnet based on her study of ancient Grecian sculptures. The style is named for the cowl, a feature of monastic dress that serves as both a collar and a hood.

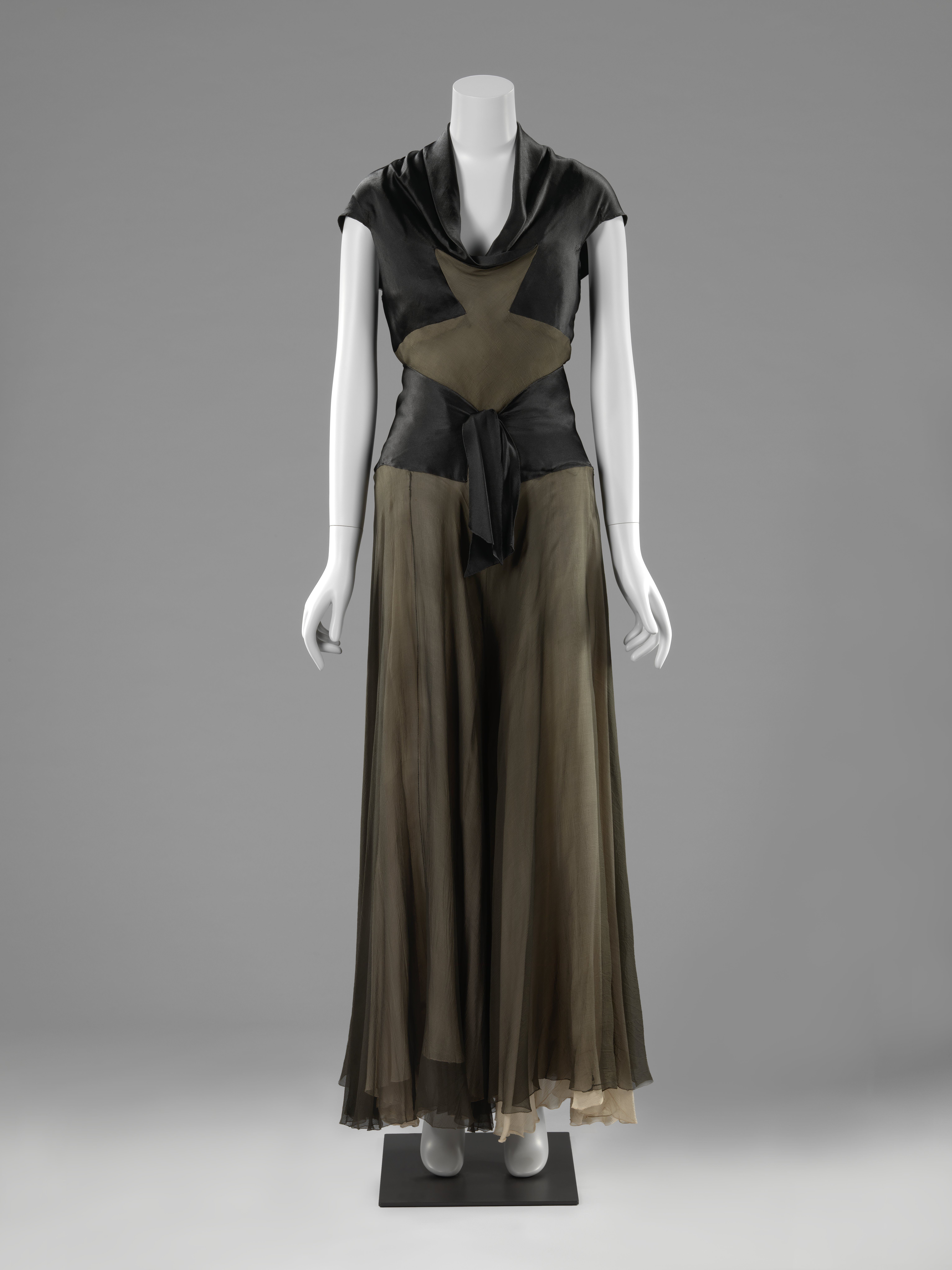
Cowl-necked pajamas created circa 1930 by Denise Vandervelde-Borgeaud based on designs by Madeleine Vionnet

== History ==
=== 20th century ===
Inspired by the draped garments of antiquity, Madeleine Vionnet created the cowl neckline in the 1920s using the bias cut technique that she helped to popularize. The cowl neck enjoyed the peak of its popularity in the 1930s.

Cowl neck sweaters were popular in the 1970s. Dresses of the disco era also frequently had cowl necks.

Cowl necklines were a common feature of slip dresses made in the 1990s by designers such as John Galliano.

=== 21st century ===
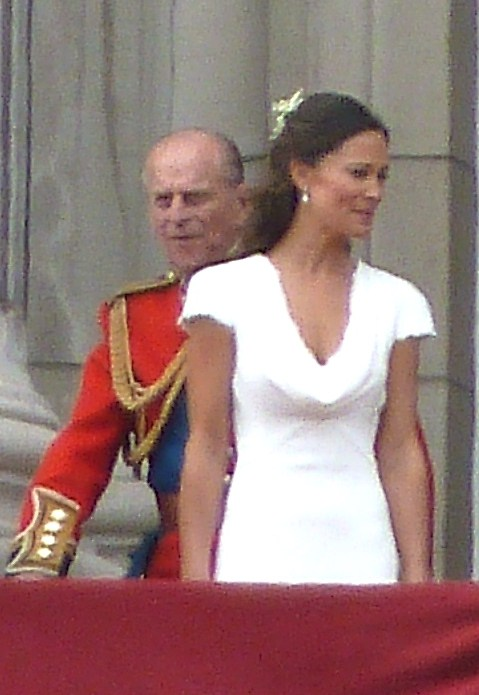
Pippa Middleton in her cowl-necked bridesmaid gown.

Two of the most notable garments of the early 2010s featured a cowl neckline. Lady Gaga's cowl-necked meat dress, created by Franc Fernandez, caused a stir at the 2010 MTV Video Music Awards. At the 2011 wedding of Prince William and Catherine Middleton, Pippa Middleton attracted media attention for wearing a form-fitting dress featuring a cowl neck. Designed by Sarah Burton for Alexander McQueen, the dress quickly generated demand for high street replicas.

The cowl neck experienced a resurgence in the late 2010s as part of renewed interest in 1990s fashion. Vivienne Westwood has been cited as an important driver of the trend.

== See also ==
- Polo neck
- Boat neck
