= Hemline =

Line formed by the lower edge of a garment

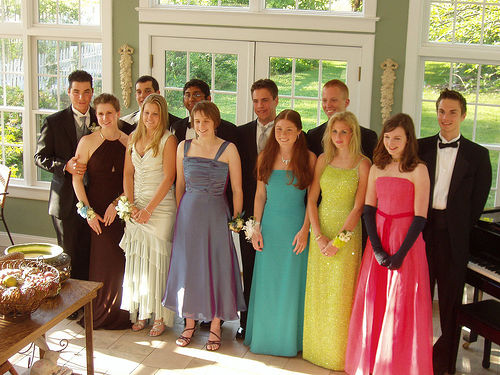
Prom dresses, with hemlines varying from above-the-ankle (tea length) to floor length

The hemline is the line formed by the lower edge of a garment, such as a skirt, dress or coat, measured from the floor.

The hemline is perhaps the most variable style line in fashion, changing shape and ranging in height from hip-high to floor-length. What is a fashionable style and height of hemline has varied considerably throughout the years, and has also depended on a number of factors such as the age of the wearer, the occasion for which the garment is worn and the choice of the individual.

== Types ==
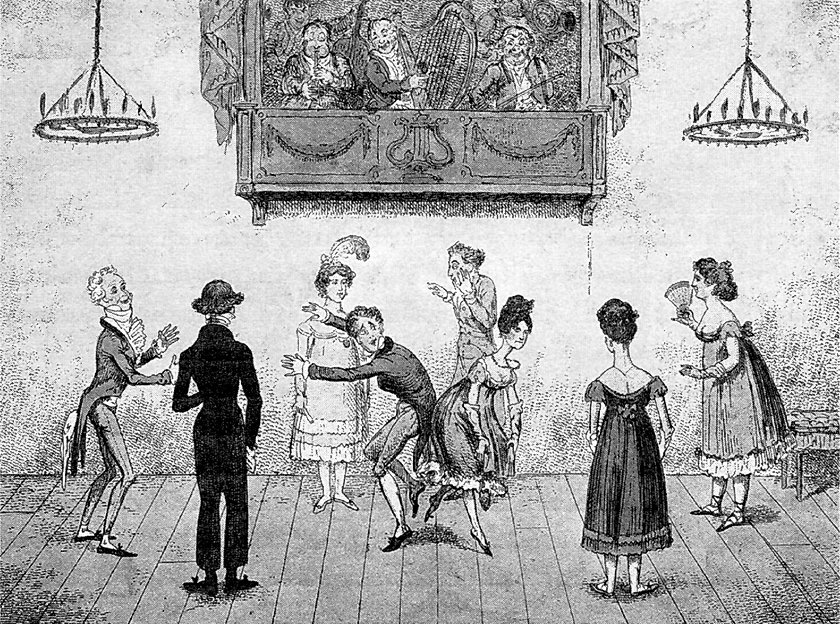
1817 caricature with ruffled hemlines (the dresses are shown as shorter than they would have been in real life).

Similar to necklines and waistlines, hemlines can be grouped by their height and shape:

- floor-length hemlines
- ankle hemlines
- midcalf hemlines
- below-knee hemlines
- above-knee hemlines
- mid-thigh hemlines
- hip-high hemlines
- handkerchief hemlines
- diagonal or asymmetric hemlines
- high-low hemlines, usually short in front and dipping behind
- other hemlines, such as modern-cut hemlines

Dresses and skirts are also classified in terms of their length:

- mini
- ballerina length
- midi
- tea length
- full length
- maxi
- Intermission length

== History ==
Overview chart of changes in hemline height (skirt length), 1805-2005

In the history of Western fashion, the ordinary public clothes of upper- and middle-class women varied only between floor-length and slightly above ankle-length for many centuries before World War I. Skirts of lower-calf or mid-calf length were associated with the practical working garments of lower-class women or American pioneer women, while even shorter skirt lengths were seen only in certain specialized and restricted contexts (e.g. sea-bathing costumes, or outfits worn by ballerinas on stage).

It was not until the mid-1910s that hemlines began to rise significantly (with many variations in height thereafter). Skirts rose all the way from floor-length to near knee-length in little more than fifteen years (from late in the decade of the 1900s to the mid-1920s). Between 1919 and 1923 they changed considerably, being almost to the floor in 1919, rising to the mid-calf in 1920, before dropping back to the ankles by 1923. 1927 saw "flapper length" skirts at the kneecap and higher before shifting down again in the 1930s.

From World War I to roughly 1970, women were under social pressure to wear skirts near to the currently fashionable length or be considered unstylish, but since the 1970s, women's options have widened and there is no longer only one single fashionable skirt-length at a time.

Another theorized influence on the length of a woman's skirt is the hemline index, which, oversimplified, states that hemlines rise and fall in sync with the stock market. The term was brought up by Wharton Business School Professor George Taylor in 1926 at a time when hemlines rose with flapper dresses during the so-called Roaring '20s. The Great Depression subsequently set in and hemlines fell to the floor once again.

== Gallery ==
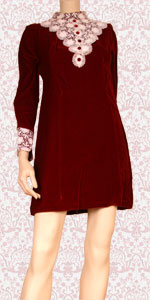
Mini dress

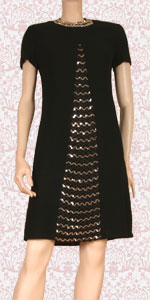
Above-knee cocktail dress

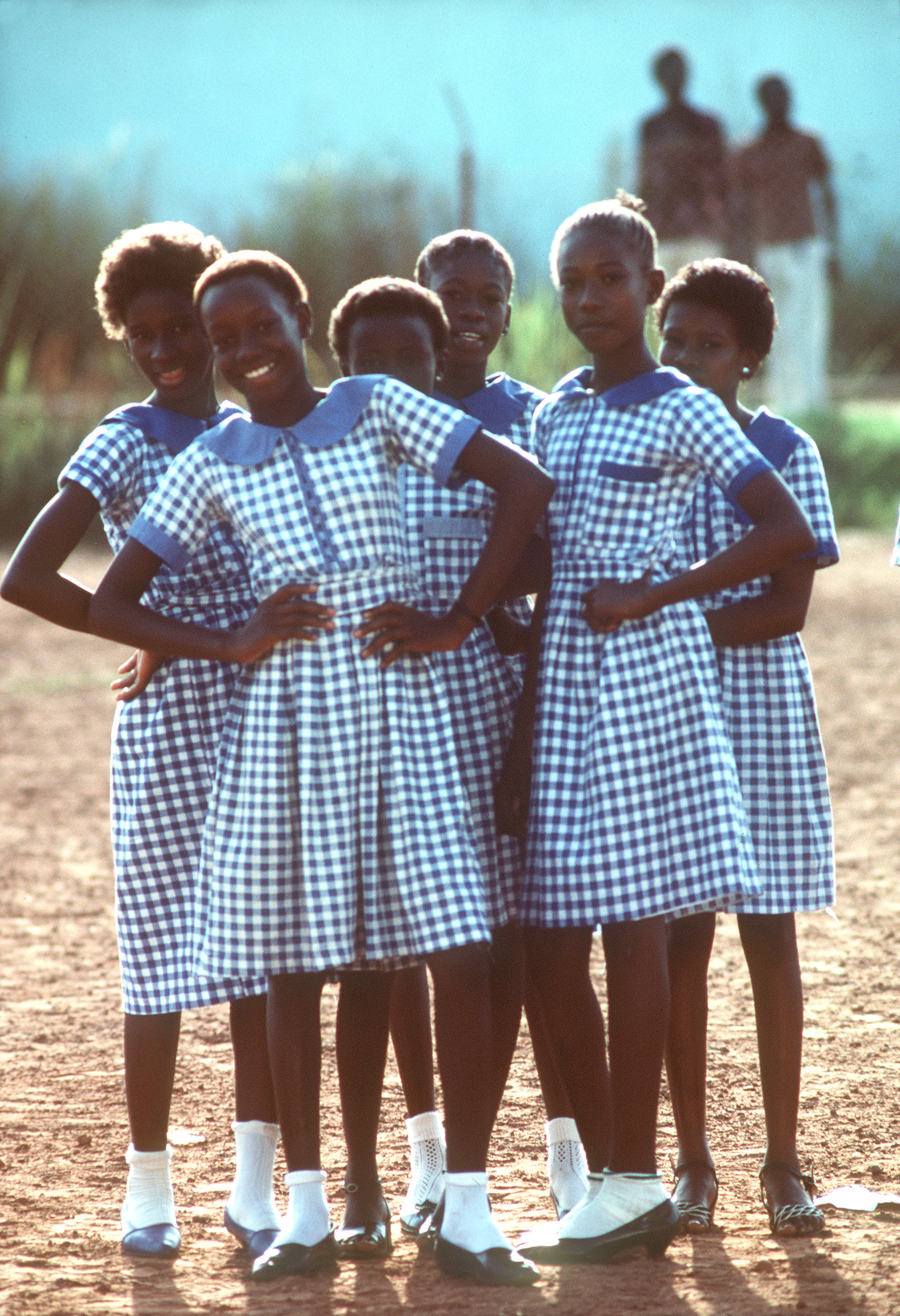
Below-knee hemlines

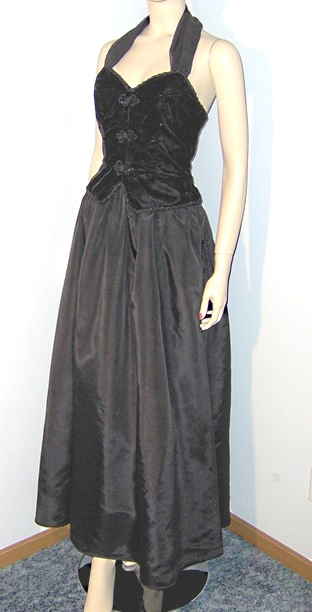
Tea length evening dress

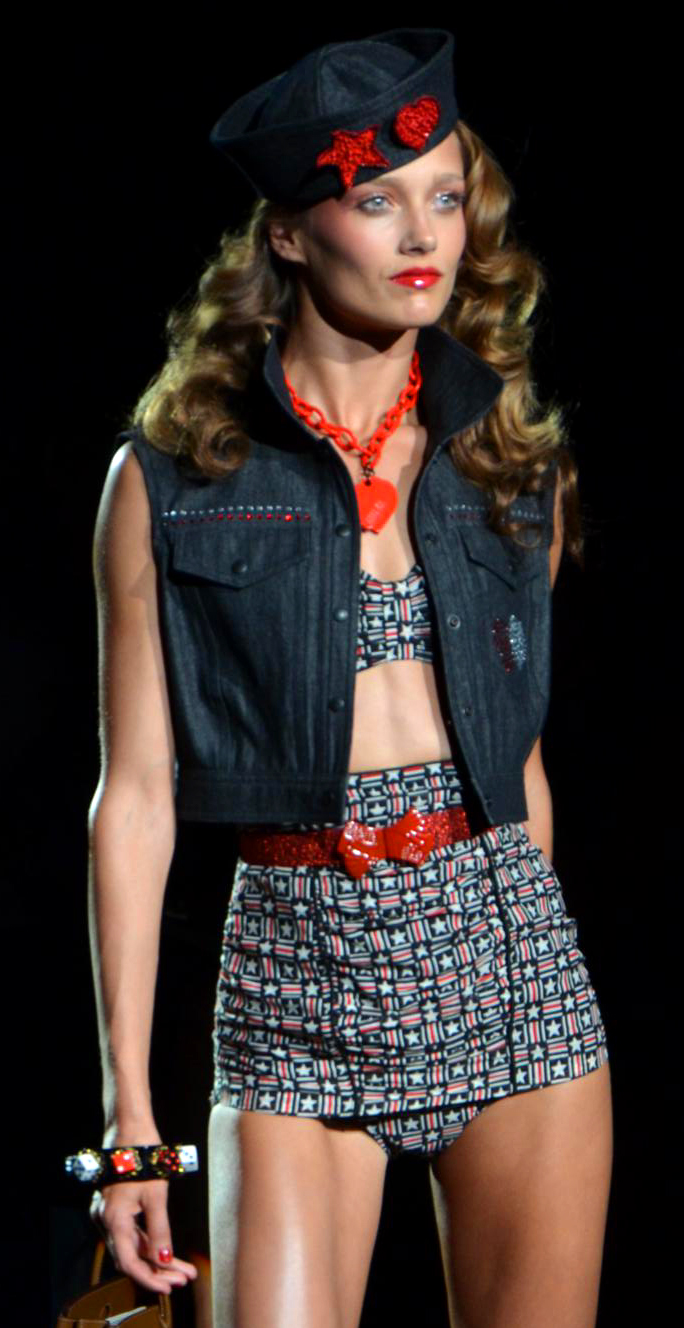
Hemline of microskirt ending above underwear

== See also ==
- Waistline
- Neckline
- Hemline index
