= Fabiana Semprebom =

Brazilian model (born 1984)

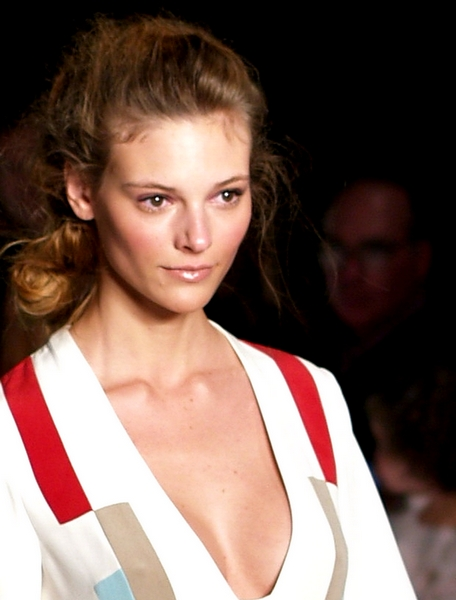
- Fabiana Semprebom in 2007
- Born: 26 May 1984 (age 42); Londrina, Paraná, Brazil
- Occupation: Model
- Spouse: Guillermo Cañas (m. 2013)
- Children: 2
- Modeling information
- Height: 1.78 m (5 ft 10 in)
- Hair color: Light brown
- Eye color: Light brown
- Agency: View Management (Barcelona); Louisa Models (Munich); Bravo Models (Tokyo)

Fabiana Semprebom (born May 26, 1984) is a Brazilian model and since 2013 the wife of Argentine tennis player Guillermo Cañas.

== Career ==
Semprebom is represented by Louisa Models, Supreme, Ford Models (New York/LA), Mega Models (São Paulo), 1st Option Model Management (Copenhagen), Women Management (Milan), Ford Models Europe (Paris). She was discovered by an agent from São Paulo while she was shopping at a local mall.

She has modelled for Dolce & Gabbana, and appeared in Vanity Fair in 2007. In 2010 she walked in the Victoria's Secret Fashion Show.
