= Boat neck =

Type of neckline

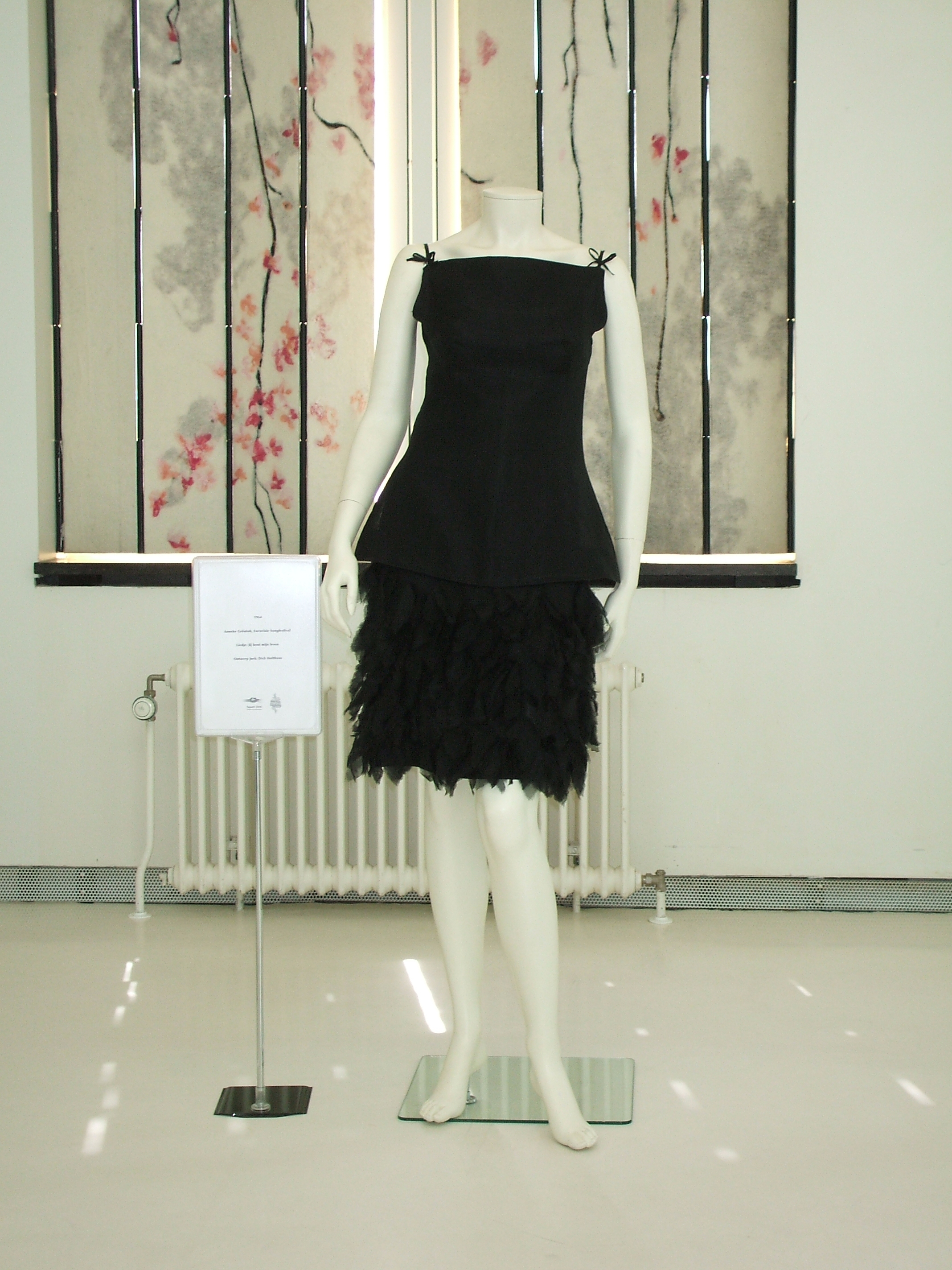
Boat neck dress worn by Anneke Grönloh

A boat neck, also called a bateau neck or Sabrina neckline, is a wide neckline that runs horizontally, front and back, almost to the shoulder points, across the collarbone. It is traditionally used in nautically inspired sweaters and knitwear, but is also featured in more elegant cocktail dresses and eveningwear. The style derives from French sailors' blouses, often with wide navy and white horizontal stripes.

== History ==
=== 19th century ===
A striped boat neck shirt was used in sailors' uniforms of the French Navy in 1858. The wide, plain neckline was said to facilitate quick removal if a sailor were to fall overboard. The style was adopted by the Russian Navy and other navies in the following years. It came into prominence in mainstream fashion in the 1920s and was popularised by Coco Chanel in the 1930s.

=== 20th century ===
In 1954, Audrey Hepburn wore a black boat neck Givenchy dress in the film Sabrina, then wore a boat neck white floral Givenchy dress at the 26th Academy Awards ceremony. This helped increase the popularity of the boat neck in the United States.

In the 1950s and 1960s, plain boat neck shirts were worn by artists associated with beatnik culture. Around that same period, Trần Lệ Xuân, wife of South Vietnam State Counsellor Ngô Đình Nhu, incorporated this neckline into the traditional áo dài, which still remains relevant today for its practicality in Vietnam's tropical climate.

=== 21st century ===
Boat necks became more prominent in fashion in the 2010s as Meghan Markle was photographed wearing them in what some magazines claimed was a signature style.

== Gallery ==
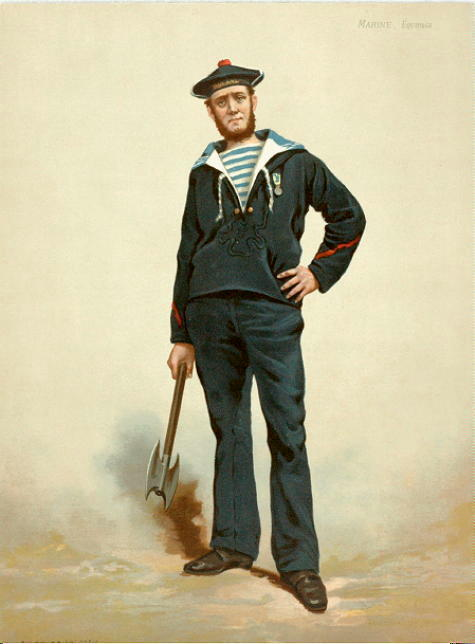
A French sailor in the 1880s wearing a striped boat neck shirt

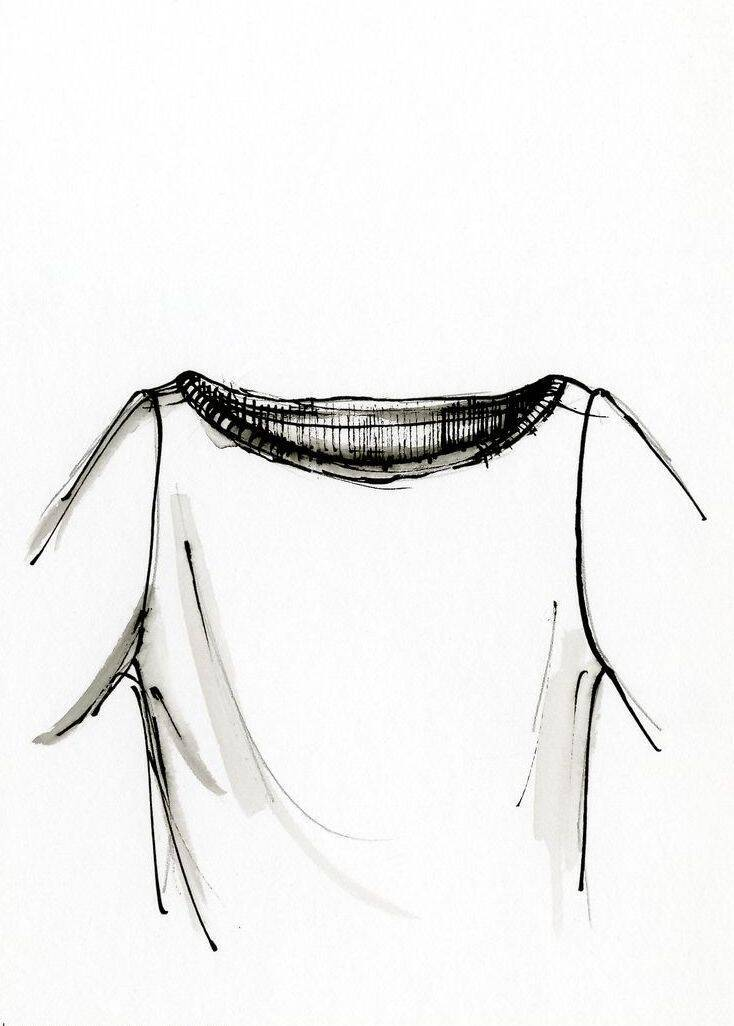
A sketch of a boat neck by David Ring

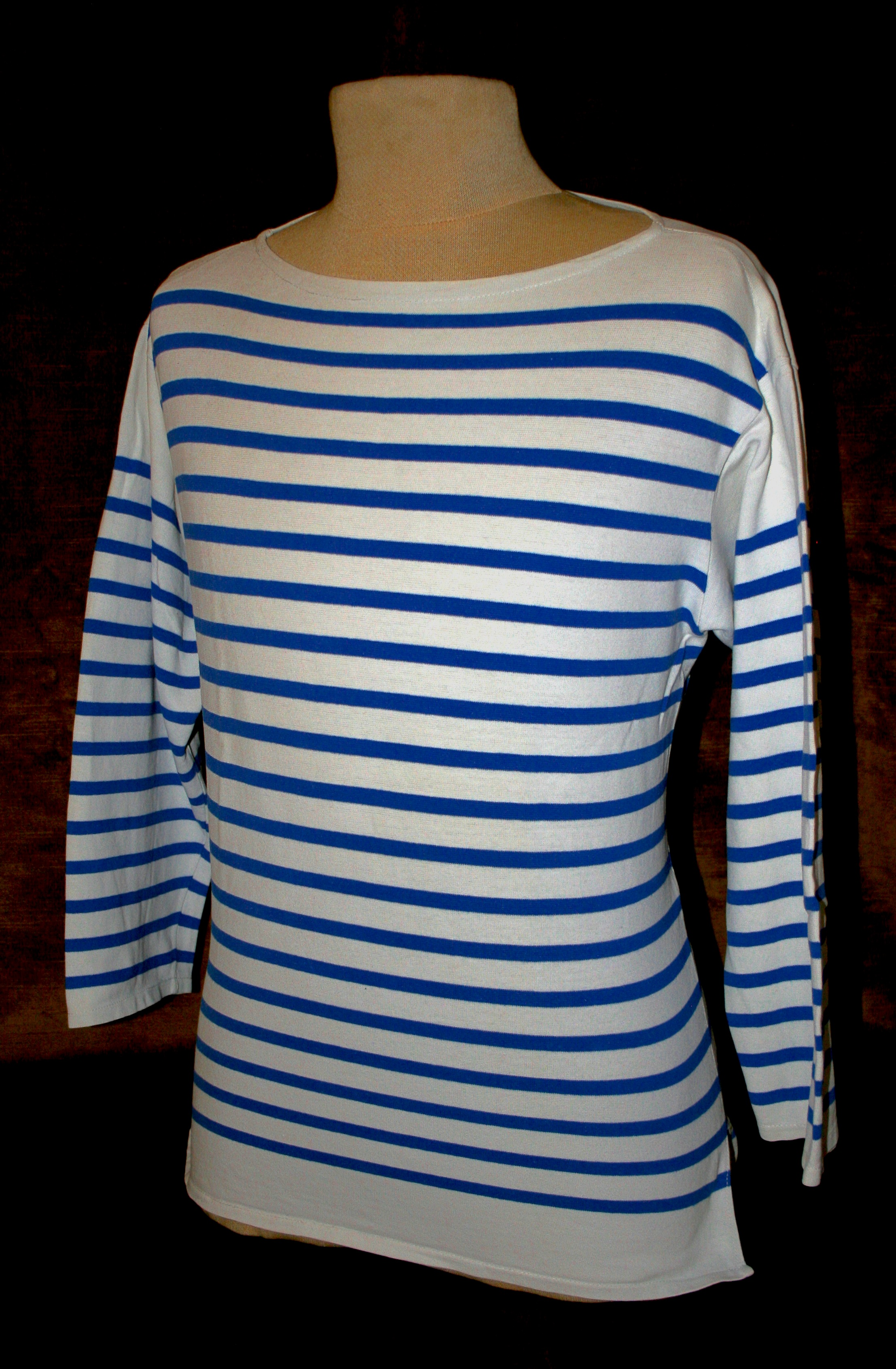
A striped boat neck shirt worn by French sailors

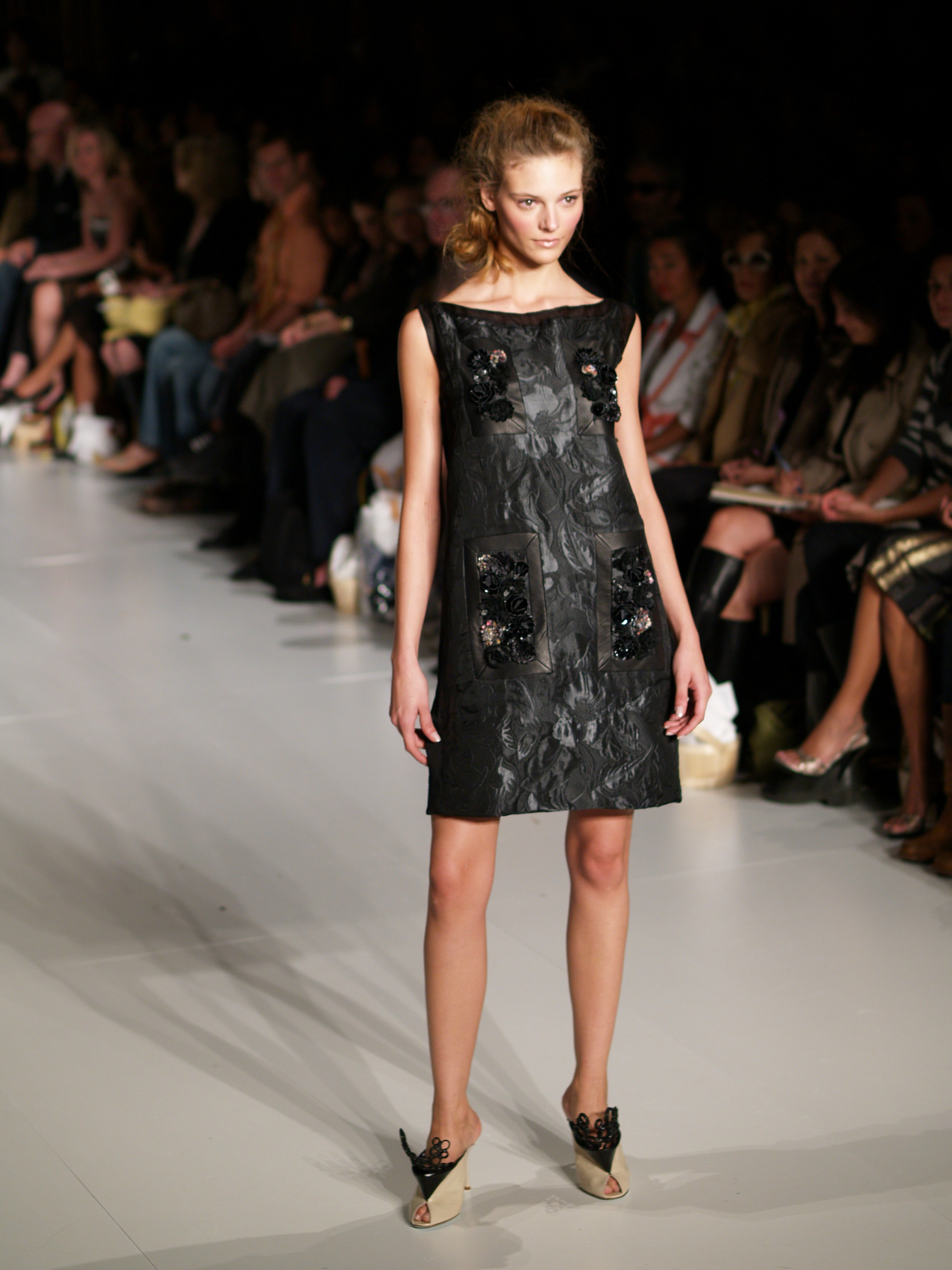
Fabiana Semprebom wearing a boat neck dress in 2006

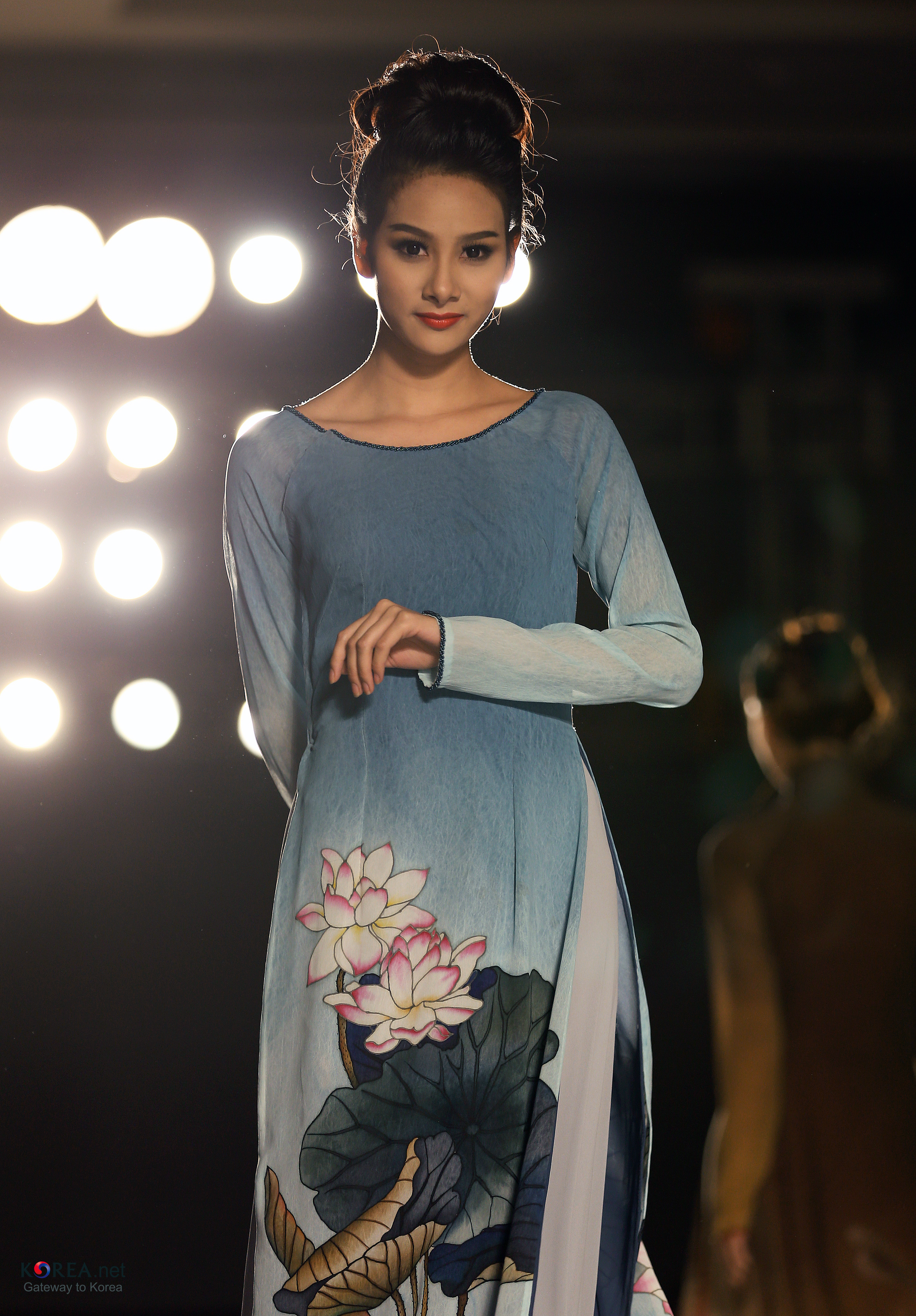
A Vietnamese model wearing a boat neck áo dài
