= Scoop neckline =

Low, rounded neckline

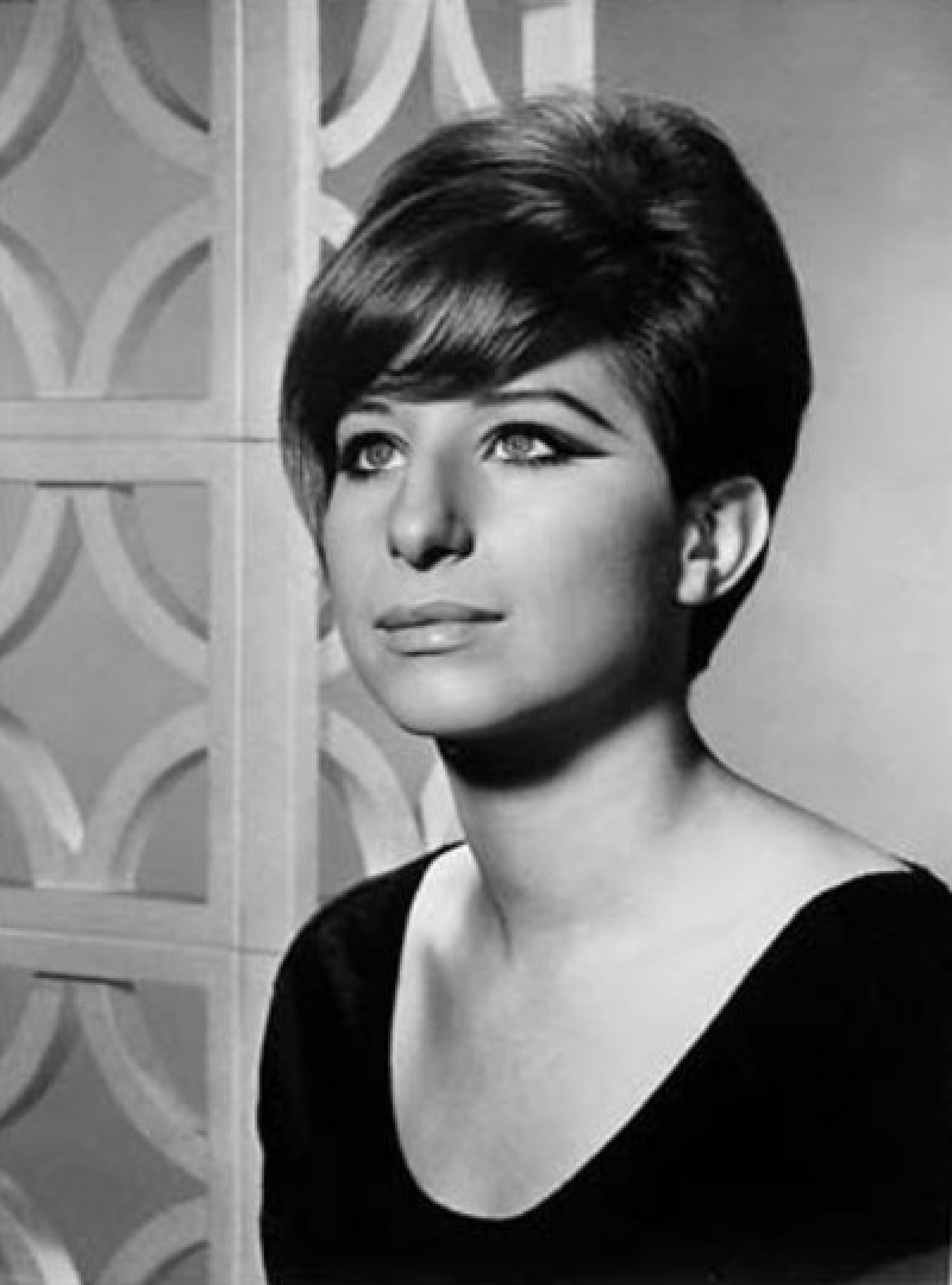
Barbra Streisand wearing a scoop neck.

A scoop neckline is a rounded neckline on a garment which is conspicuously lower in the front than in the back. Typically, this style of neckline is associated with skin-baring clothing, including undergarments and activewear.

Other applications of this neckline include warm-weather apparel, evening wear, such as evening gowns or cocktail dresses, and as a year-round stylistic detail which allows for the display of necklaces and décolletage. Most often worn by women and girls, a scoop neckline may have a non-functional collar or decorative trim as an accent, drawing attention to the exposed area.

== Gallery ==
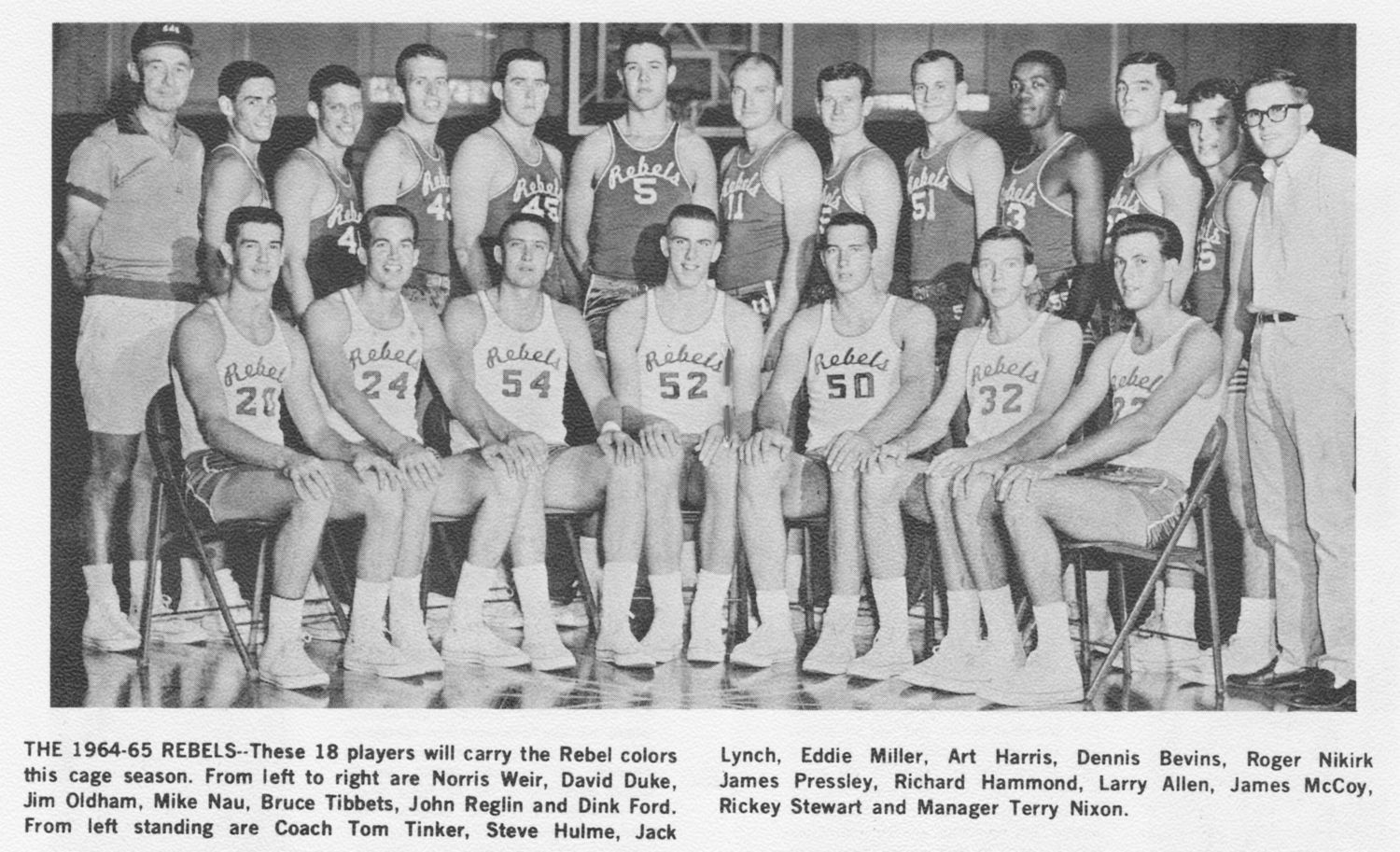
A basketball team wearing basketball jerseys

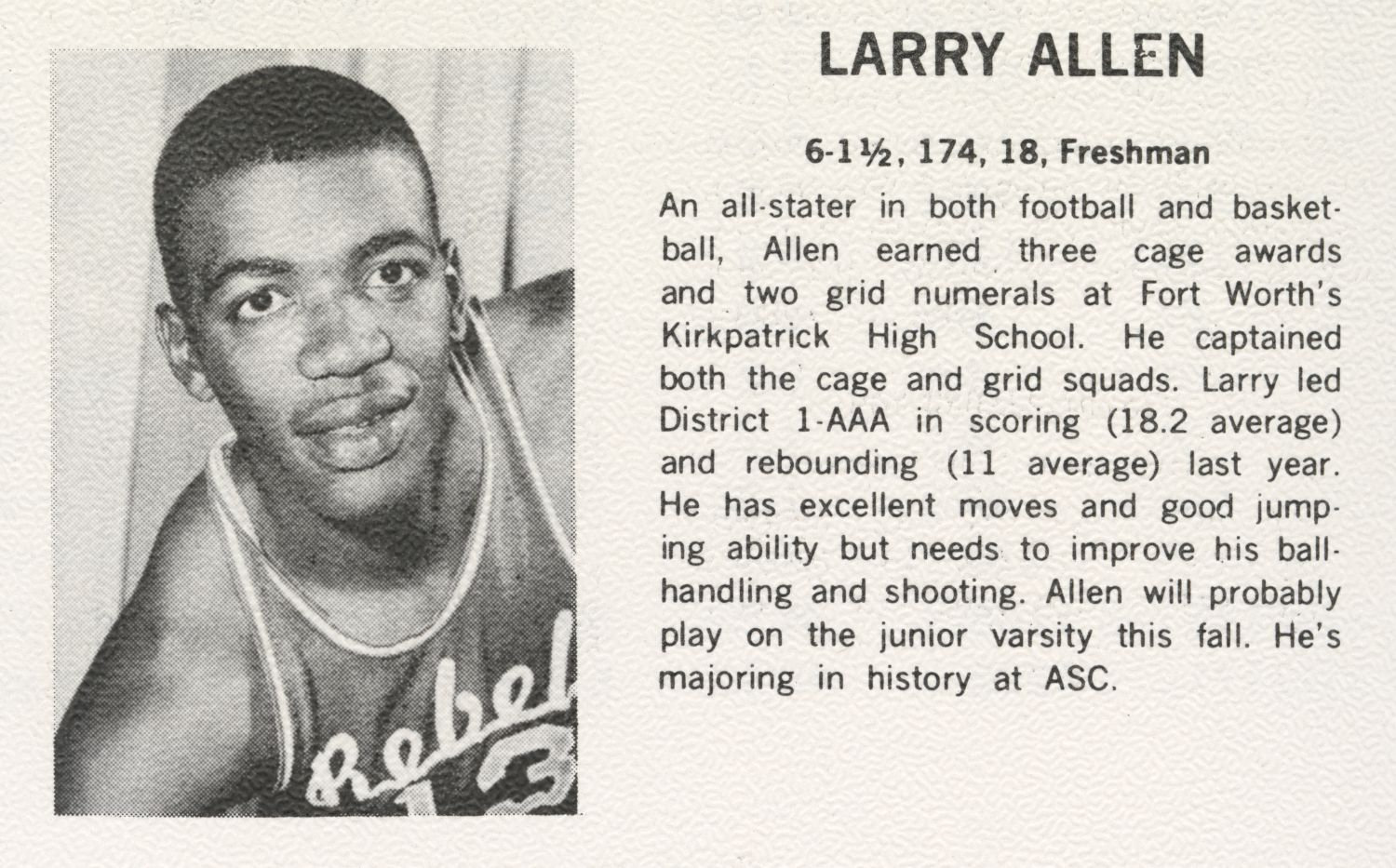
Since its earliest days, the high-energy sport of basketball has often featured scoop neck uniforms.

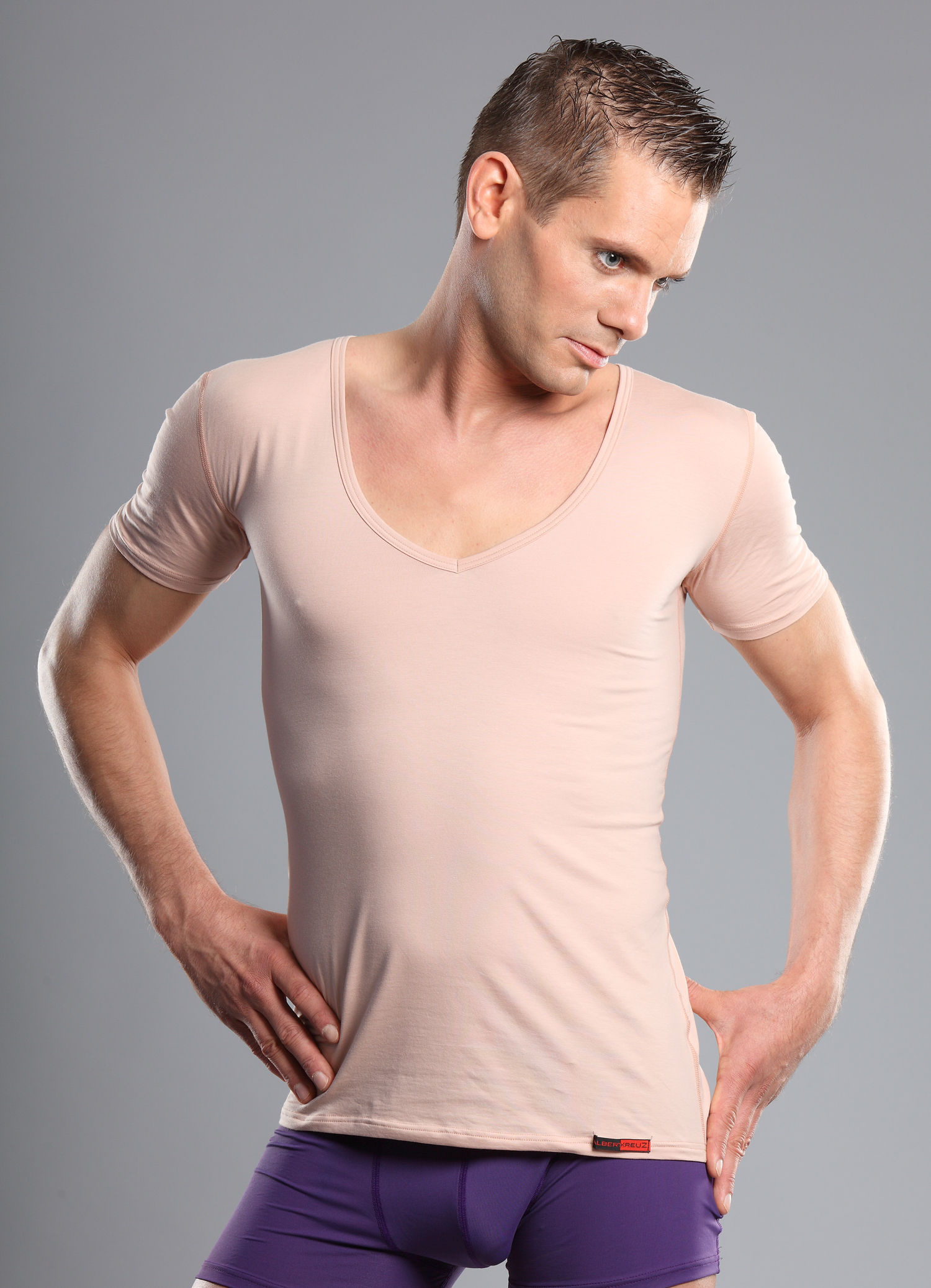
Stretch-wool undershirt with scoop neck, marketed as a v-neck

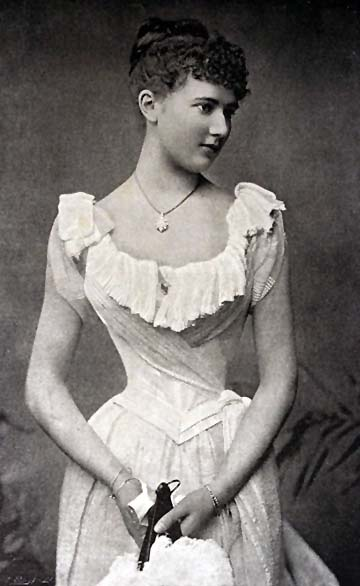
Scoop neck ballgowns, like this 1896 gown with ruffle-trimmed neckline, have been popular since the Renaissance.
