= Style line =

Seam in a garment made for visual effect

A style line is a seam in a garment made primarily for the purpose of its visual effect, rather than for the purpose of shaping of structuring the garment. By contrast, a dart or pleat by itself would not be considered a style line because although each can be used to produce a pleasing visual effect, their main purpose is to shape the garment by taking in ease or adding fullness respectively. Clearly though, there can be some ambiguity as when a dart is made as part of a seam which continues beyond the dart point. If the seam beyond the dart is straight, that is, not affecting the garment's fit, it would be considered a style line.

== See also ==
- Princess seams, a type of style line
