= Training corset =

Corset used in body modification

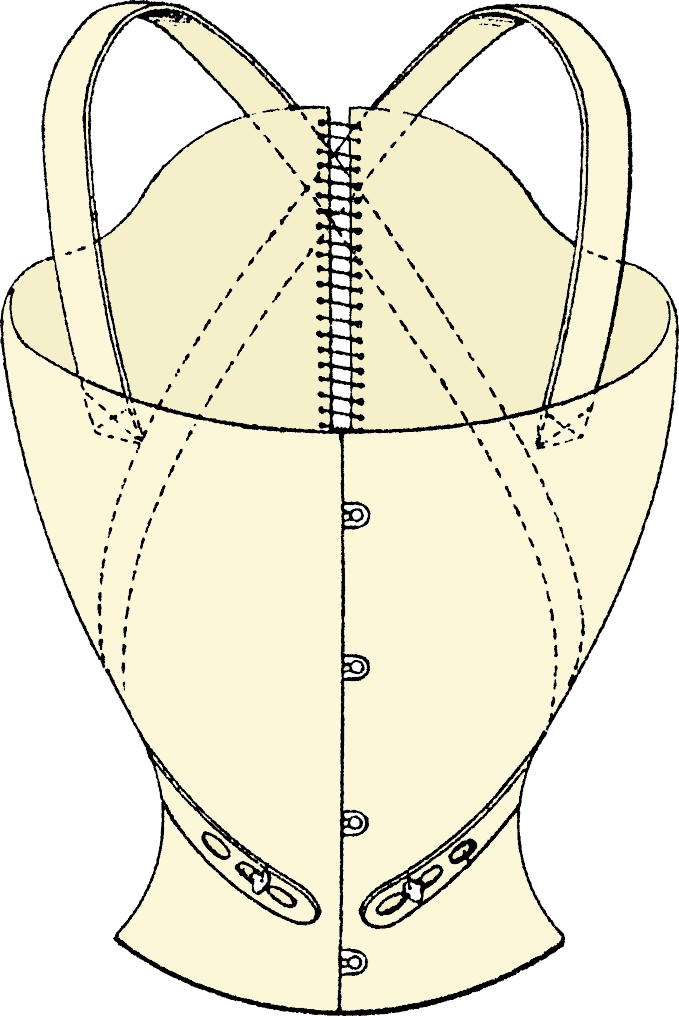
An example of a training corset. It has long, stiff shoulder straps which raise the lower ribs

A training corset is generally a corset used in body modification. A training corset is believed to help orthopedic issues (such as in attempt to correct a poor posture) and it is believed to help cosmetic issues (such as waistline, commonly called waist training or in more extreme cases tightlacing.)

In addition, the term "training corset" may refer to a corset which is used to acclimate the body prior to wearing a full corset as an everyday undergarment, this concept is called waist train.

== Redresseur corset ==
The redresseur corset or preparatory corset was a form of training corset used from the mid-19th century into the early 20th century, designed specifically for young adolescent girls who had not worn stays from an early stage. In addition to moulding a pronounced waist, it served as a back harness and was intended to improve posture.

In a number periods of western history, children were put in stays as soon as they could sit upright or walk. It was believed that the young body was too soft to grow upright on its own. Boys stopped wearing them once they were breeched, i.e. were changed from toddler's dresses to boy's breeches at about 4-7. Girls continued to wear them for their whole lives. It was not until the late 19th century that this practice began to fall away.

== Orthopedic corsets ==
Corsets may be worn for orthopedic reasons, such as correcting a crooked spine, poor posture or straightening the back and shoulders.

== Waist training corsets ==
It was primarily in the 19th century when corsets were used to noticeably reduce a woman's waist in order to achieve a fashionable hourglass figure. The corset was laced progressively tighter, forcing the floating ribs upward and compressing the soft tissue at the waist. This could lead to many negative health ramifications, including difficulty breathing, problems with digestion, and permanent deformity.

Waist training, or waist reduction, generally uses an hourglass corset. Waist reduction, sometimes called "tightlacing", is often used by women who are post-pregnancy or by women involved in BDSM.

Health effects: Modern medical research shows that long term use can pose several health risks. The compression of the upper body restricts lung expansion, leading to shallow breathing, and reduced lung capacity of 30–60%. This can cause shortness of breath, dizziness, or fainting during physical activity.

No structural features distinguish a modern waist training corset from a corset worn as an external garment for special occasions. Training corsets are usually made from strong fabric (or leather) and with relatively inflexible boning (molding body shape requires a strong corset). A training corset is designed to be used every day, and can be hidden under clothing.

== See also ==
- History of corsets
- Corset controversy
