= Hourglass corset =

Type of clothing

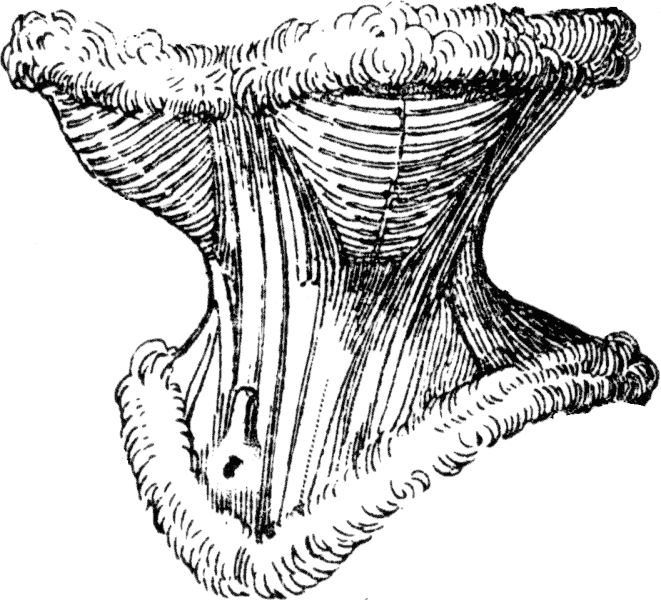
Hourglass corset from 1867

An hourglass corset is a garment that produces a silhouette resembling an hourglass shape characterized by wide hips, narrow waist (wasp waist), and wide bust.

== History ==
Hourglass corsets first became fashionable in the 1830s in Europe and the US. In contrast to Empire or late Georgian waistlines in which the "waist" lies just below the bust, Victorian fashion accentuated natural waistlines but further constricted them.

The hourglass corset achieved immediate waist reduction, as it acted mainly on a short zone around the waist. Rather than attempting to slim the torso around the ribs, tissue could be compressed and redistributed above and below the waistline.

The hourglass became the iconic corset shape. They are featured in the media; often the image of the corset shown is of a "woman clutching a bedpost while their maid pulls and pulls at the corset strings". The hourglass corset accentuated slim waists and broadened the bust, shoulders and hips. These elements worked in tandem with very wide skirts, large sleeves, and sloping shoulders to create the wide-slim-wide hourglass figure.

Hourglass silhouettes remained popular throughout the 19th century, though outerwear styles evolved. In England, France, and America, these corsets were mainly worn by aristocrats and in some cases royalty.

As skirts and sleeves shrank, Edwardian era fashions began to favor a more slender, vertical look. Princess line dresses were popular in the 1880s. These were made without a horizontal waist seam and with long vertical seams running the length of the dress, with the dress closely fitted to the body. Hourglass corsets evolved to emphasize the vertical lines of the body, and attempted to slim the torso above the waist as well.

== Variations ==
Initially hourglass corsets were not laced as tightly as the straight-fronted corsets fashionable at the beginning of the twentieth century. Corsets were still the norm, but they no longer had the exaggerated wide-narrow-wide silhouette of the hourglass shape.

Straight-fronted corsets are one of the most common styles of corset made today, and may be used for post-pregnancy waist training.

=== Pipe-stem waist ===
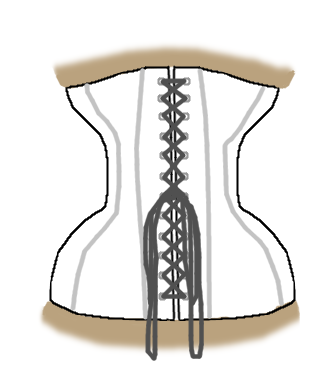
Pipe-stem waist

A pipe-stem waist is a silhouette given by wearing a certain kind of corset. The corset is designed so that the circumference of the waist is compressed for a distance above the natural waistline. These were never common, as the added pressure on the rib cage as ribs are pressed inwards can be uncomfortable.

Reports of nineteenth century pipe-stem waists on corsets often cite a height of up to 15 cm (6 inches).

Devotees of this silhouette trained their figures for many years and only a few public examples exist. Usually this figure is adopted for erotic purposes or as part of the body modification movement.

== Criticisms ==
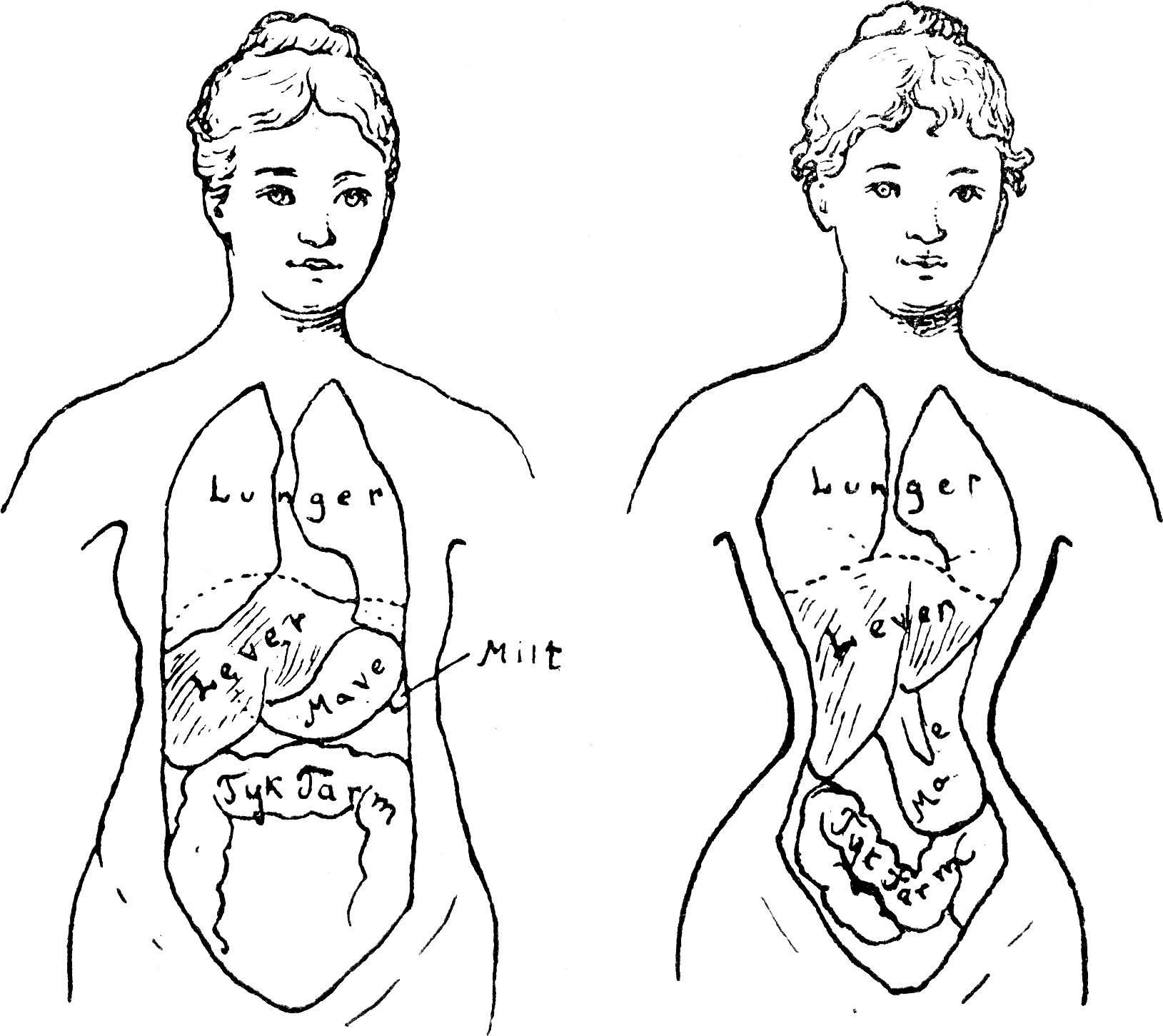
Victorian illustration of the natural vs. the corseted body.

=== Health concerns ===
Corsets were widely criticised during the 19th and early 20th centuries as detrimental to the wearer's health. While they have been praised as a device for improving posture, many health care professionals advise against the use of constrictive garments for extended periods.

Tightly laced hourglass corsets were associated with a range of physical complaints. The shape of the rib cage could be permanently altered by prolonged tight lacing. Additionally, tightly laced corsets can irritate skin, reduce lung capacity, and weaken the muscles that support the back and chest through reliance on external support. Long-term effects associated with tight-corset wearing include reduced pelvis size, constipation and digestive issues, and reproductive problems.

Victorian-era physicians frequently published warnings about the dangers of tight lacing, and medical journals of the period carried numerous articles condemning the practice. Despite these warnings, the hourglass silhouette remained fashionable for decades. Some historians note that the actual degree of tight lacing in everyday practice was often less extreme than the most dramatic accounts suggested, and that most women wore corsets at a moderate level of compression.

=== Social and feminist criticism ===
Beyond health concerns, corsets were also criticised on social and moral grounds. Critics argued that the hourglass ideal imposed an unnatural and uncomfortable standard of beauty primarily on women, reinforcing gendered expectations about body shape and femininity. The image of the tightly corseted waist became associated with the constraints placed upon women more broadly in Victorian society.

The women's dress reform movement of the 19th century advocated for more practical, unconstrictive clothing, arguing that women's health and freedom of movement were being sacrificed to fashion. Reform dress activists, including members of the Rational Dress Society (founded in 1881), campaigned against tight lacing and promoted looser-fitting alternatives. These critiques prefigured later feminist analyses of clothing and the body, which viewed the corset as a symbol of patriarchal control over women's bodies and identities.

== See also ==
- History of corsets
- Tightlacing
- Corset controversy
