= Waistline =

Waistline may refer to:

- Waist, the narrow point of the human body between the ribcage and hips
- Waistline (clothing), the line of demarcation between the upper and lower portions of a garment
