= Rib removal =

Surgical excision of a rib

- Specialty: Plastic surgeon (if not for therapeutic reason)

Rib removal is surgery to remove one or more ribs. Rib resection is the removal of part of a rib. The procedures are done for various medical reasons. A number of celebrities have been falsely rumoured to have had ribs removed as a form of body modification.

== Therapeutic removal ==
Rib removal may be medically approved in several situations. If a rib is fractured in such a way that it might puncture a vital organ, it may be safer to remove it than wait for it to heal. A cancerous rib may be removed to stop the cancer from spreading. Rib bone material may be used for a bone graft. The excess pressure of thoracic outlet syndrome may be reduced by rib removal. Major surgery to the thoracic cavity, such as open heart surgery, may require removal of ribs to allow access to the organ being operated on.

== Body modification ==
Victorian fashion valued a wasp waist and hourglass figure for women. This was achieved through laced corsets. Twentieth-century rumors hold that some women had their lower ribs removed to facilitate tighter lacing of the waist. In 1931, corset-maker Rosa Binner alleged that French actress Polaire had had her lowest rib removed in the 1890s. Germaine Greer's second-wave feminist book The Female Eunuch gives the practice as an example of male-directed distortion of the female body. Valerie Steele's history of the corset finds no evidence of such a procedure, and with Lynne Kutsche argues the mortal danger of surgery of the era makes it extremely implausible.

Barbara Mikkelson of Snopes.com suggests that Florenz Ziegfeld might have started such a rumor about his protégée Anna Held to publicize her career. Similar stories have been spread about later celebrities. Cher hired a physician in 1990 to confirm that she has a full set of ribs. It was rumored that Marilyn Manson had ribs removed to facilitate autofellatio.

Interviewed for a Vogue article in 2000, John E. Sherman of Weill Cornell Medical College said that while such a procedure was theoretically possible, there was no record of it in the medical literature.

American model and performer Amanda Lepore reportedly underwent a surgery similar to rib removal in 2000, going to Mexico to have some of her ribs "broken and pushed in."

In 2015, Swedish model Pixee Fox, citing inspiration from hyper-feminine cartoon characters, like Tinker Bell and Jessica Rabbit, sought to have six of her ribs removed in order to create a more exaggerated hourglass figure. The surgery, performed in Carmel, Indiana by plastic surgeon Dr. Barry Eppley, reportedly cost Fox $9,000 USD and removed the ribs 10 through 12, as well as some of the muscle attached to them. After her surgery, Fox was able to shrink her waist to 16 inches in circumference while in a corset. Her experience was documented by Barcroft TV. In an interview with Closer, Fox said it had initially been difficult for her to find a doctor willing to perform the surgery.
