= Aleksandr Yashankin =

Russian bodybuilder

Alexander Yashankin
- ♂ professional bodybuilder

Personal info
- Full name: Alexander Sergeevich Yashankin
- Born: 5 June 1952 (age 72); Lohmachi, Republic of Tatarstan, Russian SFSR, Soviet Union

Best statistics
- Bench press: 175 kg (386 lb)
- Biceps: 44 cm (17 in)
- Chest: 110–117 cm (43–46 in)
- Height: 170 cm (5 ft 7 in)
- Thighs: 66–67 cm (26–26 in)
- Waist: 80 cm (31 in)
- Weight: 80–90 kg (176–198 lb)

Professional (Pro) career
- Active: 1989–present
- Coach: Dmitry Kornyuchin

Alexander "Sasha" Sergeevich Yashankin (Russian: Александр Сергеевич Яшанькин; born 5 June 1952) is a Russian professional bodybuilder and powerlifter. He holds eleven bodybuilding world titles in different age categories.

== Anthropometry ==
- Height – 170 cm
- Weight – 80–90 kg
- Squat – 250 kg
- Deadlift – 270 kg
- Push Rod Classic – 200 kg
- Jerk rod – 160 kg
- Bench press – 175 kg
- Biceps – 44 cm
- The volume of the chest as you exhale – 110 cm
- The volume of the chest on inhalation – 117 cm
- Thigh – 66–67 cm
- Waist – 80 cm
- Shin – 43.5 cm

== Career ==
Alexander worked at Dimitrovgrad for 35 years as a coach. He dedicated 10 years to powerlifting. He took first place at the bodybuilding championships in Tolyatti in 1989. He has won the majority of championships since that date. He lives and works in Yekaterinburg.

== Awards ==
- In 2016, voted the best fitness trainer Ekaterinburg.
- According to the channel "Iron World" is recognized as a successful athlete.
- Best in the category "Sports" in the magazine "EKB.Sobaka.ru».

== World Championships ==
- Spain: Torrevieja 1993 year, 1st place
- Poland: "mixed couple", 1993, 2nd place
- Turkey: İzmir, 1994, 2nd place
- Poland: Katowice, 1995, 1st place
- Slovakia: Bratislava, 1996, 1st place
- Slovakia: Bratislava, "mixed couple", 1997, 2nd place
- Spain: Alicante 2001, 1st place
- Spain: Tenerife, 2003, 1st place
- Hungary: Budapest 2005, 1st place
- Italy: Sicily, in 2006, 2nd place
- Hungary: Budapest, 2007, 1st place
- Czech Republic: Brno 2008, 1st place
- Turkey: 2010, 3rd place.
- Hungary: Budapest, 2012, the 1st place.
- Mongolia: Ulaanbaatar, 2013, 1st place.
- Mexico: Morelia, 2014, 1st place.
- Dominican Republic: Santo Domingo, 2016, 1st place.

== European Championships ==
- Russia, Tyumen, 1994, 2nd place in the standings, and 1st place in the team
- Turkey, Istanbul, 1995, 3rd place
- Russia, Tyumen, 2007, 1st place
