= Ethel Granger =

British body modification pioneer

Ethel Granger (born Ethel Mary Wilson; 12 April 1905 – 1982) was one of the most famous main figures in the development of contemporary piercing and body modification in Europe. As world record holder with the narrowest documented waist size, she entered the Guinness Book of Records with a waist circumference of only 13 inches (together with the French actress Polaire).

== Life ==
She was born in Milton, Cambridgeshire in 1905. As a young woman, Ethel met astronomer William Arnold Granger (1 July 1904 – 4 March 1974), whom she married in 1928. The marriage produced a daughter, Wilhelmina Granger (1930-2001). Her husband required that she wear a corset so that she would have a narrow waist; including at night. While she initially opposed this, she later agreed. She wore it day and night, eventually cinching her waist to a circumference of 33 centimetres. To prevent her removing the corset, her husband gave her a steel belt to wear during his absence. The constriction was so great some days that she would almost lose consciousness. He also had her wear progressively taller high heels, eventually reaching 15cm.

Her husband's fetishism led him to start piercing Ethel himself. Thus, in the following years, she received several piercings from her husband in her nose, lips, cheeks and nipples. Her husband wrote: "if she can outshine other members of her sex in some way, this is a victory worth any amount of suffering".

== Reviews ==
In September 2011, the Italian edition of the fashion magazine Vogue wrote Ethel Granger an issue.

It would be inaccurate to see the story of Ethel and William Granger simply as the sadistic desires of a demanding, sexually perverted husband who wanted to cripple his wife: they were a couple expressing themselves and embracing a subculture that at that time, in the late 20s, 30s and 40s, had magazines like London Life as a point of reference.

— VOGUE italia, September 1, 2011

In 2019, the Association of Professional Piercers and the US Body Piercing Archive created the exhibition Mr. Sebastian and the European Piercing Underground to be presented at the Las Vegas Conference in 2020. The exhibit also highlights piercing pioneers Horst Streckenbach and Ethel Granger. Lecturers include Jeremy Castle of the Alan Oversby/Mr Sebastian Archive, Manfred Kohrs of the Institute of German Tattoo History, European-body-art-focused art historian Matt Lodder of University of Essex, Paul King of the U.S. Body Piercing Archive, and Jim Ward.

== Literature ==
- Guinness World Records 2015 Volume 60 Publisher Guinness World Records 2014, ISBN 1 908 8437 05.
- Elayne Angel: Piercing Bible: The Definitive Guide to Safe Body Piercing. Crossing Press 2009, ISBN 1-580-91193-5, p. 13.
- Valerie Steele: Fetish: fashion, sex and power. Oxford University Press 1997, ISBN 0-195-1157-91.
- Martin Mobberley: Return to the Far Side of Planet Moore: Rambling Through Observations, Friendships and Antics of Sir Patrick Moore. Springer 2015, ISBN 3-319-157-809, p. 60-62.
- Meredith G. F. Worthen: Sexual Deviance and Society: A sociological examination. Routledge 2016, ISBN 1-317-5933-75, p. 303.
- Rossie Atwell: The Grangers of Peterborough - an astronomical family. In: Journal of the British Astronomical Association, Vol. 100, No. 5, p. 214-217
- David Kunzle: Fashion and Fetishism: Corsets, Tight-Lacing and Other Forms of Body-Sculpture. The History Press, 2006, ISBN 0752495453.
