= Princess line =

Garment cut without a horizontal waist seam

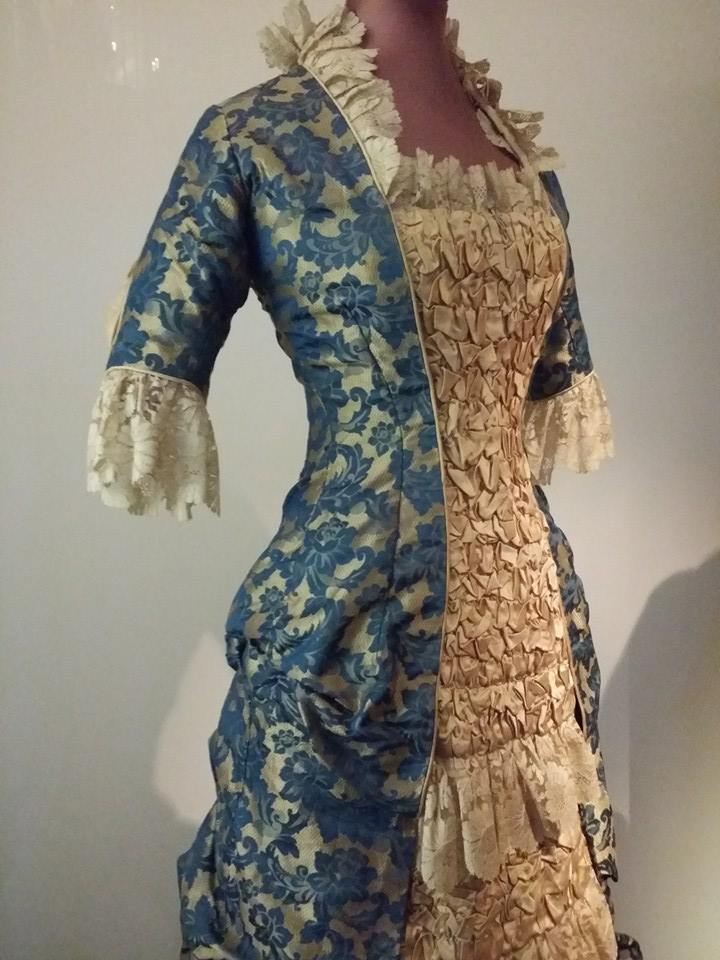
1878–1880 Princess line dress. V&A, CIRC.606-1962

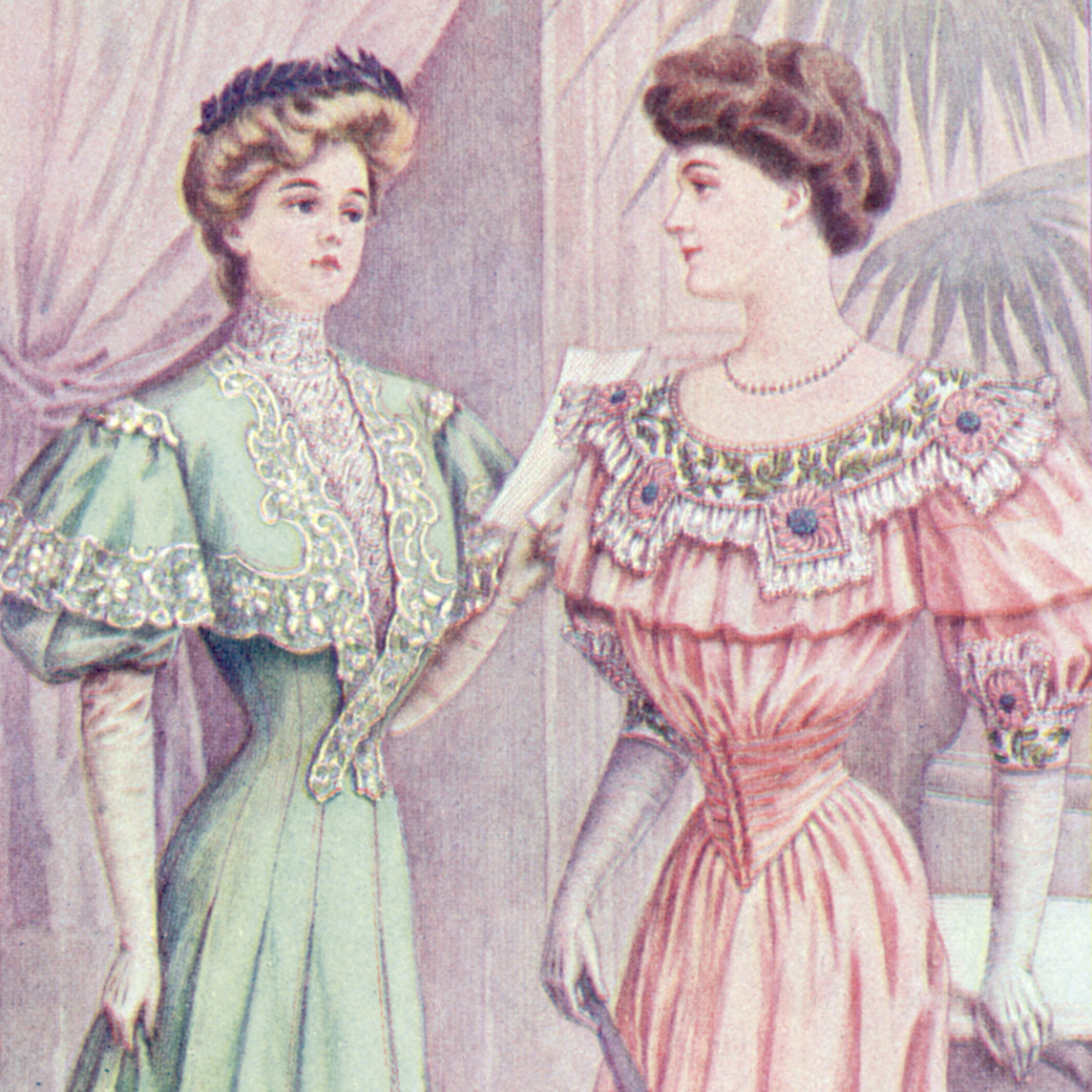
A princess line dress is shown on the left. The other dress has a clear separation between bodice and skirt. September 1905

Princess line or princess dress describes a woman's fitted dress or other garment cut in long panels without a horizontal join or separation at the waist. Instead of relying on darts to shape the garment, the fit is achieved with long seams (princess seams) and shaped pattern pieces. A rarely used alternative name for the princess line was French-dart-line dress.

== History ==
=== 19th century ===
The princess line is popularly associated with Charles Frederick Worth who first introduced it in the early 1870s. It was named in honour of the famously elegant Princess Alexandra. By the late 1870s and early 1880s the princess dress was a popular style. It is considered one of the first "bodycon" (body-conscious) fashions due to its extremely closely fitted design, presenting the figure in a natural (or at least, corseted) form undistorted by either crinoline or bustle. Princess-line polonaises were worn over long underskirts. The princess line was also popular for young girls who wore it with a sash or, if slightly older, over a longer underskirt.

=== 20th century ===
The princess line was a staple of dress design and construction throughout the century. In 1951 the couturier Christian Dior presented a princess-line-based fashion collection which is sometimes called the "Princess Line", although its official name was Ligne Longue or "Long Line".

=== 21st century ===
The princess line remains a popular style for wedding dresses and a design staple for both day and evening dresses. More recently, the design principle has been applied to men's garments, which generally do not have waist seams.

== See also ==
- Clothing terminology
