= Waist =

Part of the abdomen between the rib cage and hips

- The human waist

Identifiers
- FMA: 228775

Waist-to-hip ratios

The waist is the part of the abdomen between the rib cage and hips. Normally, it is the narrowest part of the torso.

Waistline refers to the horizontal line where the waist is narrowest, or to the general appearance of the waist.

== Structure ==
Because of this and because the waist is often synonymous with the stomach, one can become confused as to the exact location of the waist. Another confusing factor is that the waistline differs on different people. A study showed that self-reported measurements, as opposed to measurement done by a technician, underestimated waist circumference and this underestimation increased with increased body size. In the study, waist circumference measured at the level of the umbilicus was larger than that measured at the natural waist.

To locate the natural waistline, one need simply stand upright and then tilt over to the side, keeping the legs and hips straight. Where the torso creases is the natural waistline.

== Size ==
=== Waist measurement ===
Strictly, the waist circumference is measured at a level midway between the lowest palpable rib and the iliac crest. This is the definition used by the World Health Organization.

Practically speaking, the waist is usually measured at the smallest circumference of the natural waist, usually just above the belly button. Where the waist is convex rather than concave, as in pregnancy and obesity, the waist may be measured at a vertical level 1 inch above the navel. Some laypersons use the level at the navel, but this can lead to underestimates.

When using an automated body scanner that produces a point cloud, neither the bones nor the navel can be located from the scan itself. A commonly used definition is the circumference at 4 cm above small of the back (SOB), though this does not appear to be the best fit for the strict definition, and 2 cm above SOB appears better (in a sample of 106 women of different ages, heights, weights, and body shapes).

Variables such as posture significantly influence the measurement of the waist, and therefore any measurements for a group need to maintain a constant posture between the subjects.

=== Waist–hip ratio ===
Waist–hip ratio is the ratio of the circumference of the waist to that of the hips. It measures the proportion by which fat is distributed around the torso.

=== Size and health ===
Waist size (waist circumference) is an indicator of abdominal obesity and is one of the criteria for diagnosing the metabolic syndrome. Excess abdominal fat is a risk factor for developing heart disease and other obesity related diseases. A study published in the European Heart Journal in April 2007 showed that waist circumference and waist–hip ratio (defined as waist circumference divided by hip circumference) were predictors of cardiovascular events. The National Heart, Lung, and Blood Institute classifies the risk of obesity-related diseases as high if men have a waist circumference greater than 102 cm (40 in) and women have a waist circumference greater than 88 cm (35 in). Further, waist circumference seems to be a better predictor of adverse health outcomes than the body mass index (BMI). For example, those who lift weights may have high BMI but are at relatively low risk for cardiovascular consequences. For these people, waist circumference may be a better indicator of overall health.

Some research suggests waist circumference can be predicted from brain function, therefore capturing the neurobehavioral pathophysiology of obesity.

An extremely high waist circumference can lead to falsely low estimates of bone health when using the trabecular bone score.

== Society and culture ==
=== Fashion ===
In modern clothing, the region referred to as the waist is considerably below the waist as defined anatomically. With the advent of pants and skirts that do not require support from above, the clothing waist moved down to a position where the body starts to expand to form the buttocks and a support is therefore available. However, the waist region remains a highly important measurement and anthropometric landmark in garment construction.

Jewellery, such as a belly chain, may be worn around either the clothing or anatomical waist.

=== Waist reduction and training ===
Waist reduction or waist training refer to the act of wearing a corset or other constricting garment to reduce or alter the waistline. The four floating ribs may be permanently compressed or moved by such garments. A girdle may also be used to alter the appearance of the waist.

Waist reduction may be used simply to reduce the width of the waist. This change can be permanent or temporary.

Waist training may be used to achieve a certain permanent waist shape, such as a pipe-stem waist.

== History ==
=== Etymology ===
Definition: "middle part of the body," also "part of a garment fitted for the waist, portion of a garment that covers the waist" (but, due to fashion styles, often above or below it), probably from Old English *wæst 'growth', hence, 'where the body grows', from Proto-Germanic *wahs-tu- (cognates: Old English wæstm, Old Norse vöxtr, Swedish växt, Old High German wahst 'growth, increase', Gothic wahstus 'stature', Old English weaxan 'to grow'.

== See also ==
- Abdominal obesity
- Alvinolagnia
- Belly dance
- Body modification
- Human body
- Midriff
- Navel
- Rib removal
- Waist–hip ratio
- Waist-to-height ratio
- Category:Corsetry
  - Hourglass corset
  - Tightlacing
  - Training corset
  - Waist cincher
- Waistcoat
- Lumbar
