= Wasp waist =

Women's fashion silhouette

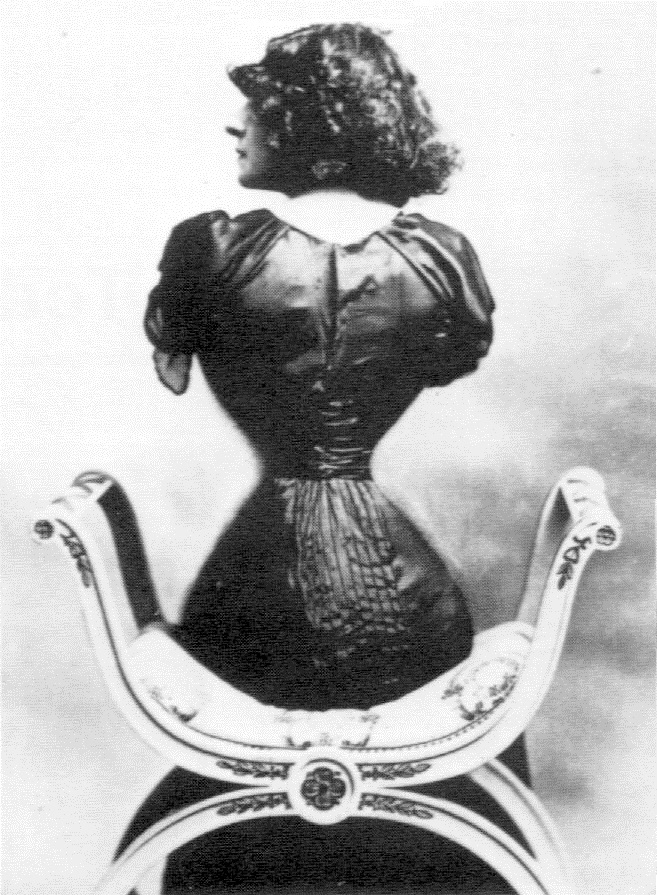
Polaire, a French actress famous for her wasp waist. (photo edited to exaggerate the narrow waist, as was common; note blurring)

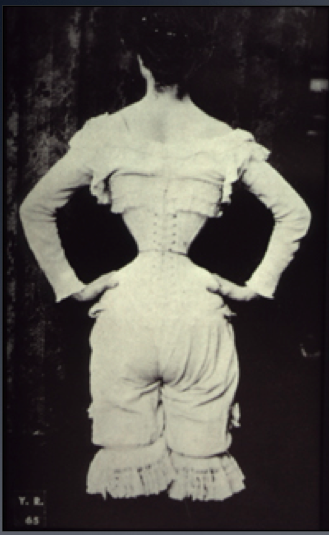
Photograph (1890) (photo likely edited)

Wasp waist is a women's fashion silhouette, produced by a style of corset and girdle, that has experienced various periods of popularity in the 19th and 20th centuries. Its primary feature is the abrupt transition from a natural-width rib cage to an exceedingly small waist, with the hips curving out below. It takes its name from its similarity to a wasp's segmented body. The sharply cinched waistline also exaggerates the hips and bust.

== History ==
In the 19th century, while average corseted waist measurements varied between 23 and 31 inches (58 and 79 cm), wasp waist measurements of 16 to 18 inches (41 to 46 cm) were uncommon and were not considered attractive. Ladies' magazines told of the side effects of tight lacing, proclaiming that "if a lady binds and girds herself in, until she be only twenty-three inches, and, in some cases, until she be only twenty-one inches, it must be done at the expense of comfort, health, and happiness." Fashions instead created the illusion of a small waist, using proportion, stripe placement, and color. Retouching photographs was sometimes used to create the illusion of a wasp waist.

Extreme tight lacing (15–18 in or 38–46 cm) was a fad during the late 1870s and 1880s, lasting until around 1887.

== Health effects ==
Among the multitude of medical problems women suffered to achieve these drastic measurements were deformed ribs, weakened abdominal muscles, deformed and dislocated internal organs, and respiratory ailments. The displacement and disfigurement of the reproductive organs greatly increased the risk of miscarriage and maternal death.

== See also ==
- Corset controversy
- Foot binding
- Tightlacing
