= A-line (clothing) =

Style of skirts and dresses

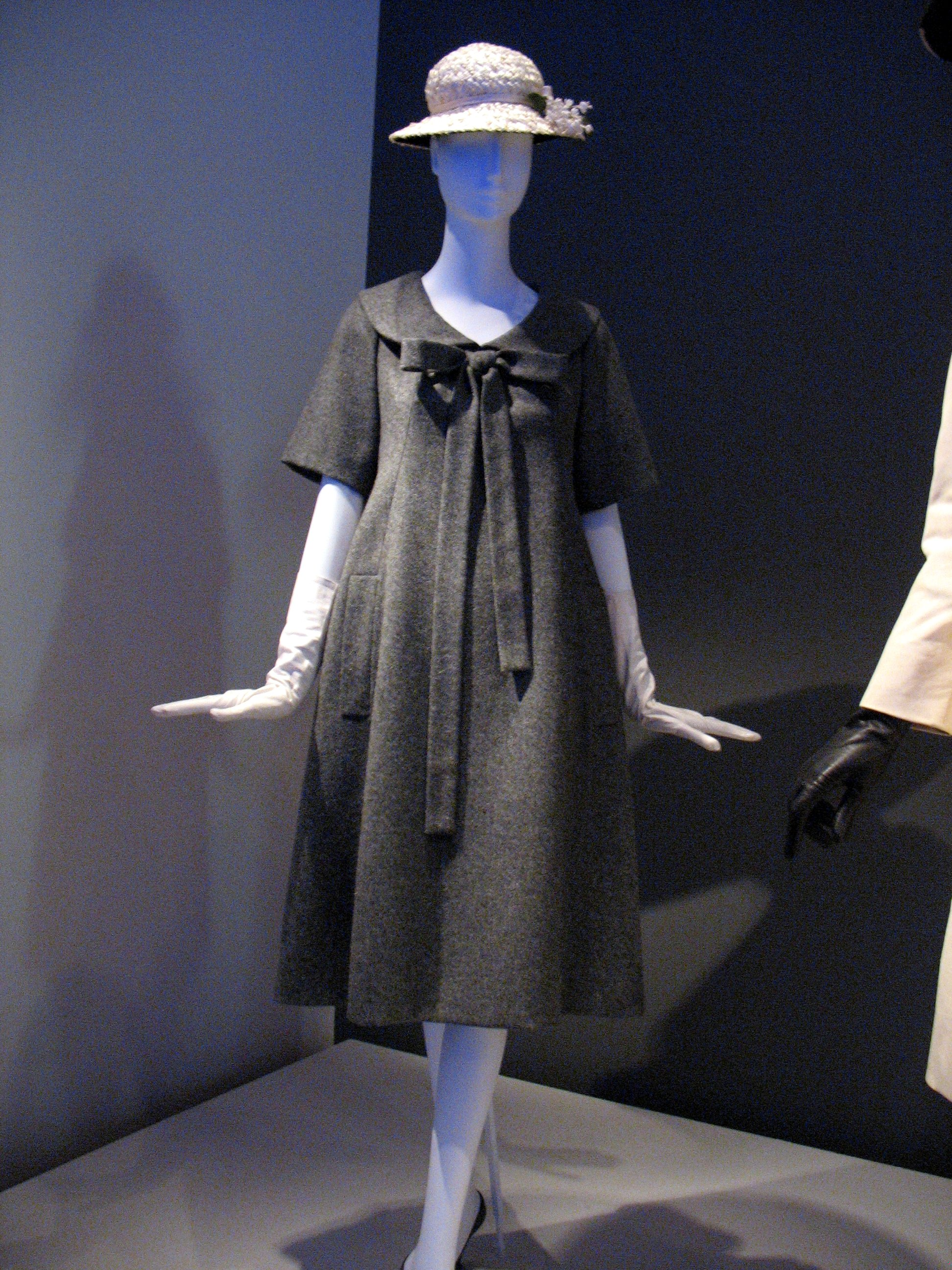
1958 trapeze dress. Yves Saint Laurent for Dior.

An A-line skirt is a skirt that is fitted at the hips and gradually widens towards the hem, giving the impression of the shape of a capital letter A. The term is also used to describe dresses and coats with a similar shape.

== History ==
The term was first used by the French couture designer Christian Dior as the label for his collection of spring 1955. The A-Line collection's feature item, then the "most wanted silhouette in Paris", was a "fingertip-length flared jacket worn over a dress with a very full, pleated skirt".

Although an A-shape, this silhouette was not identical to what is now understood to embody the A-line idea. That idea was given its definitive expression and popularized by Dior's successor, Yves Saint Laurent, with his "Trapeze Line" of spring 1958, which featured dresses flaring out dramatically from a fitted shoulder line.

A-line clothes remained popular in the 1960s and 70s, disappeared from fashion almost completely by the early 1980s and were revived by the retro trend of the late 1990s. By that time, "A-line" was used more loosely to describe any dress wider at the hips than at the bust or waist, as well as a number of flared skirt styles. "True" A-line shapes on the pattern of Dior and Saint Laurent saw a revival in the early 2000s.

== Style details ==
The A-line skirt has no visible embellishments for ease, such as pleats or slits, but is fitted to the upper hip by means of seams and/or darts. However, denim A-line skirts often have buttons down the center seam. Its fastening is usually kept discreet, with a side or back zipper. A belt is sometimes used. Pockets may be present, but not usually. It can be cut at any length.

When referring to dresses and coats, the term A-line generally means fitted from the shoulders to the hips and then widening to the hem, but it is also sometimes used to mean widening from the shoulders to the hem, ignoring the waist and hips.

It is often used to describe a popular style of wedding dress, which is fitted above and around the hips but flares gently to the hem, giving a streamlined and quite slim look.
