= Bustline =

Body measurement

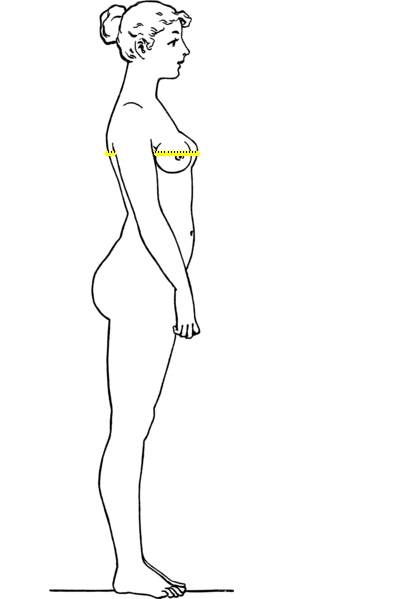
A bust measure

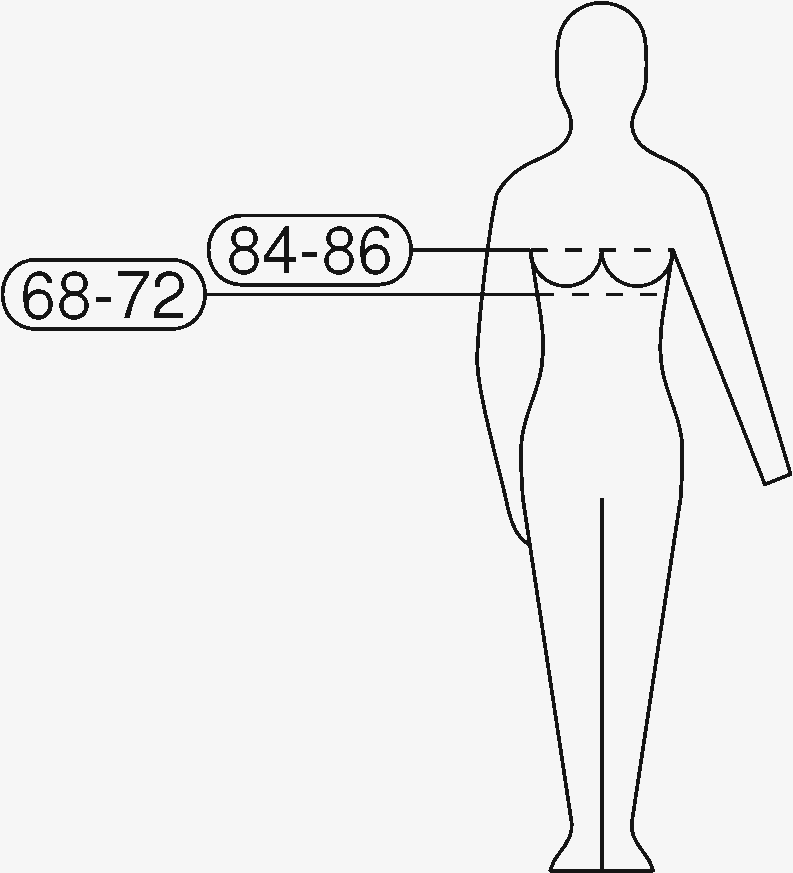
Pictogram for the European bra size 70B - the bustline is 84-86cm

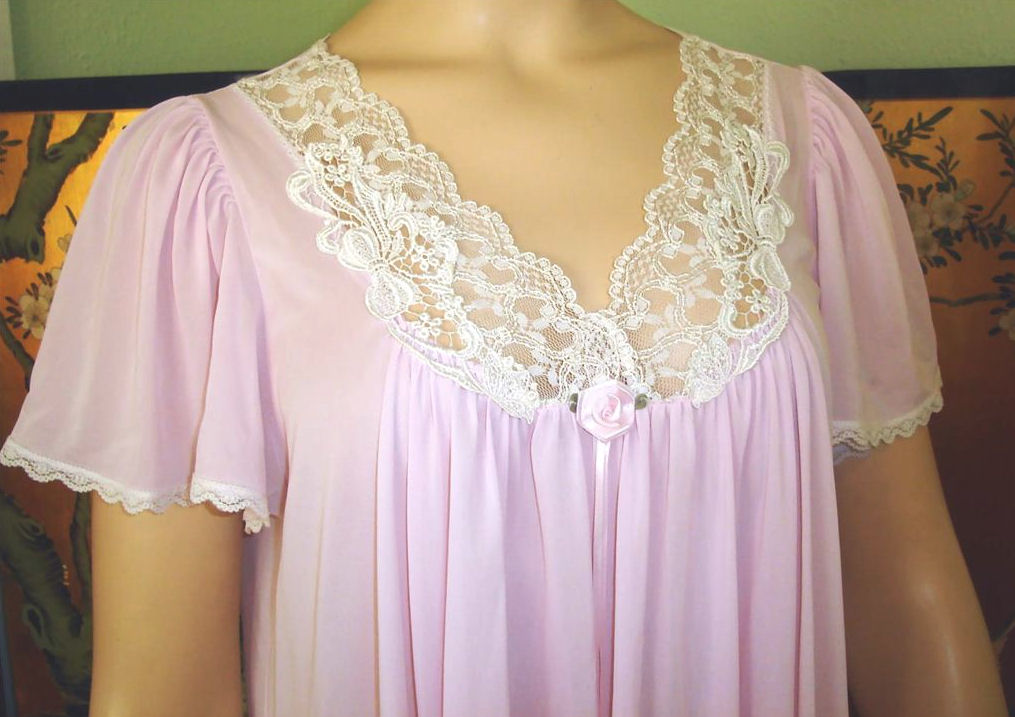
Nightie with loose bustline

A bustline is an arbitrary line encircling the fullest part of the bust or body circumference at the bust. It is a body measurement which measures the circumference of a woman's torso at the level of the breasts. It is measured by keeping a measuring tape horizontal and wrapping it around the body so that it goes over the nipples and under the arms.

In relation to a woman's garment, the bustline is the outline or shape of a woman's bust, or the part of the garment which covers the breasts, such as a dress with a fitted bustline. The bustline is an important measure in women's clothing sizes.

A full bust is another term for the bustline measure but is also commonly used to refer to a breast with a cup size of at least C.

== Other measures ==
These measures are usually taken when taking measurements for the bustline of a woman's garment, especially if the garment is to be form-fitting at the bust.

- A high bust is a measure of a woman's torso above her breasts.
- An under-bust is the measure below the breasts.

== See also ==
- Hemline
- Neckline
- Waistline
