= Princess seams =

Garment seam that shapes the bust

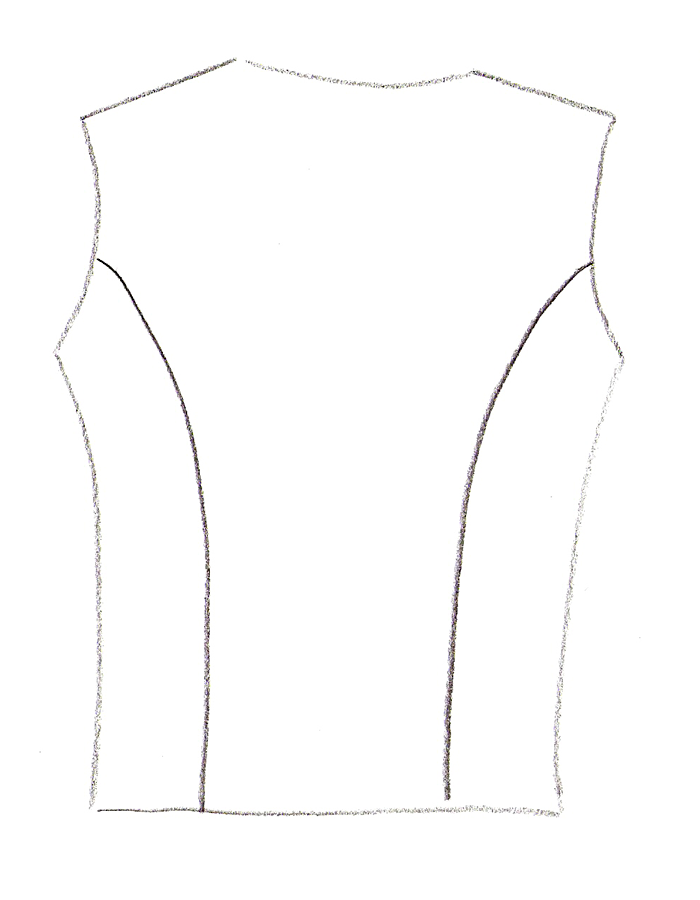
An illustration of princess seams on a bodice.

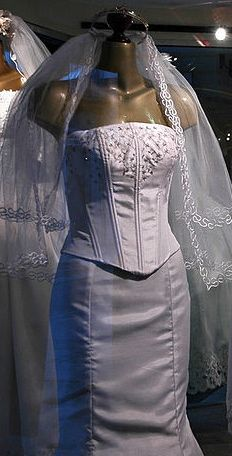
A wedding dress with princess seams on the bodice and skirt.

Princess seams (Note: A princess seam that begins in the armscye is occasionally called a 'Viennese seam', though use of that term is uncommon.) are long curved seams sewn into women's blouses or shirts to add shaping or a tailored fit to closely follow the shape of a bust. They are a dart variation that is sewn into the front or back of a shirt that extends from the waist up to the shoulder seam or armscye. Princess seams are distinct from darts in that they form a continuous line and are a full seam. Darts, on the other hand, are folds sewn into the clothing to shape the resultant garment.

The princess seam style of dress needs no waistline since it does its shaping by joining edges of different curvature. The princess seam that extends from the shoulder (or under the arm) curving gently over the bust point and down to the lower hem creates a long, slimming look.

== See also ==
- Clothing terminology
