= Empire silhouette =

Woman's dress style with a high waist and narrow skirt

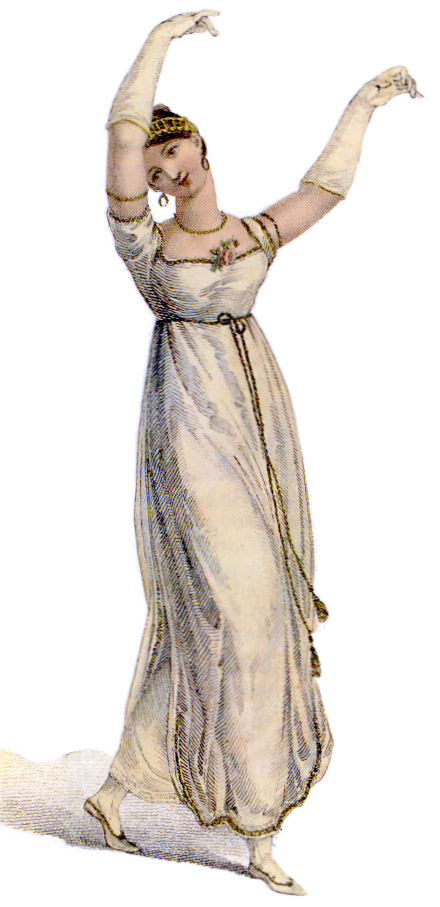
Evening gown, from 1811

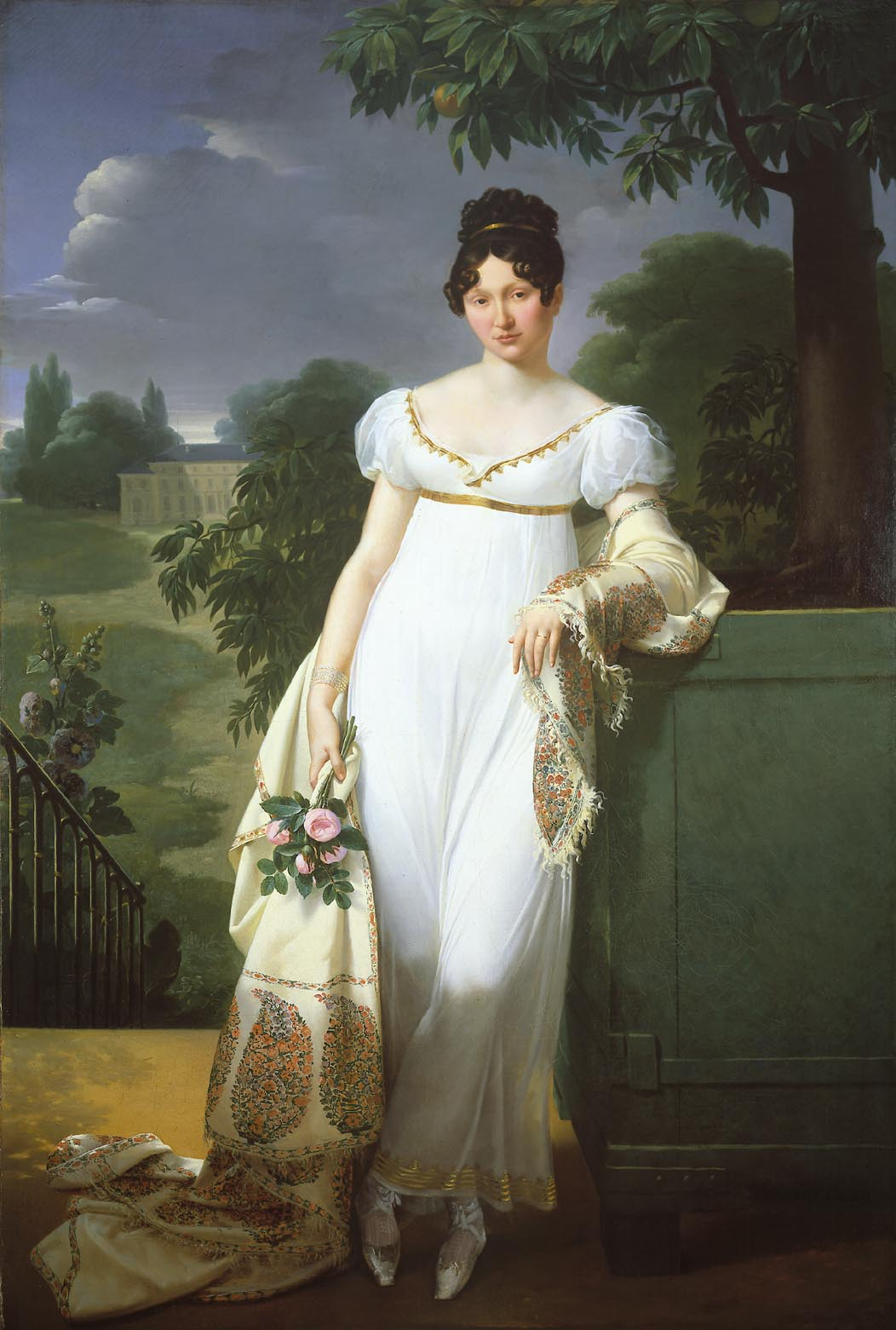
French lady in 1808; the style was often accompanied by a shawl or similar wrap, or a short "Spencer" jacket, as the dresses were light and left much uncovered.

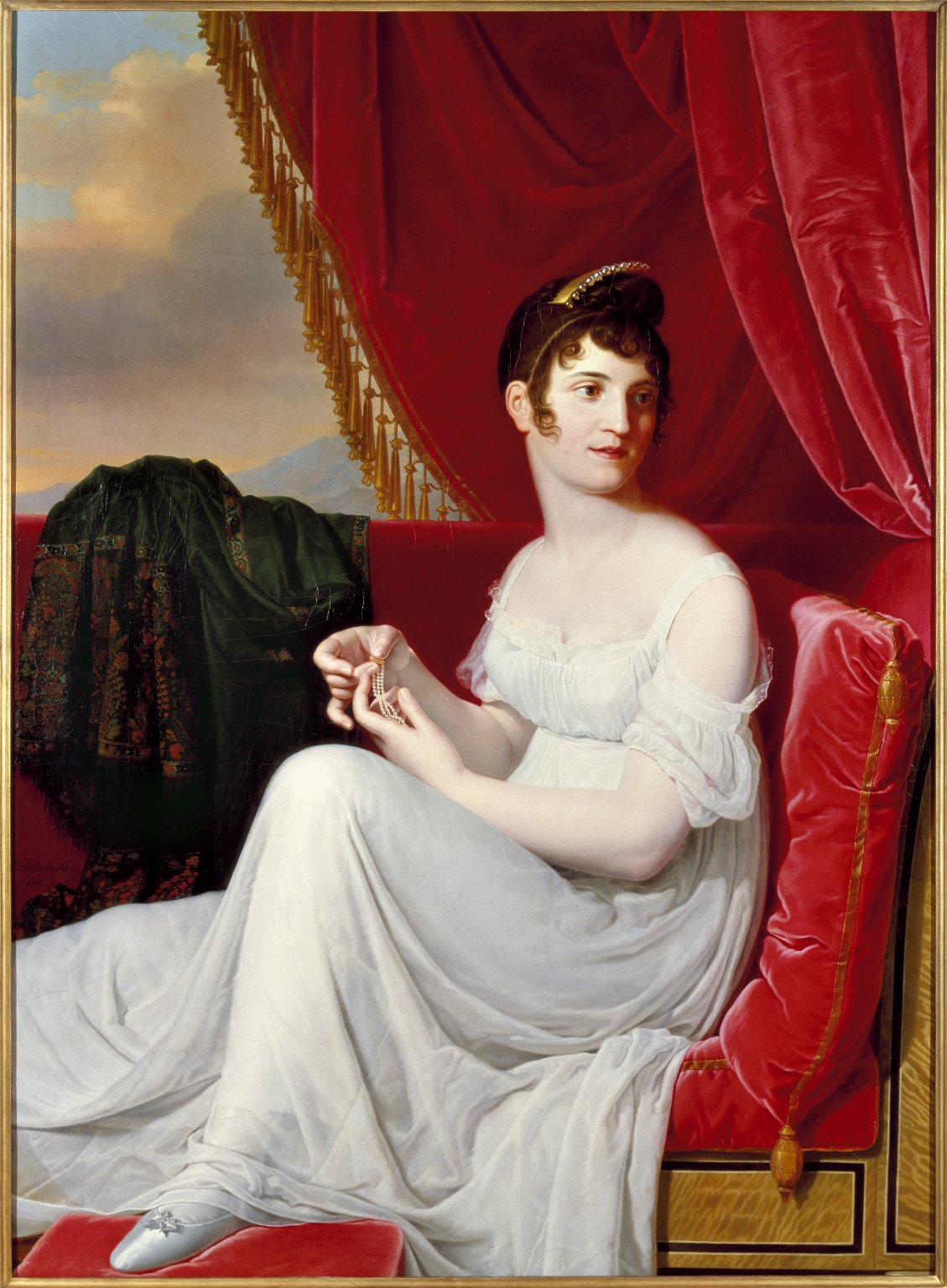
Portrait of Thérésa Tallien by Jean-Bernard Duvivier (1806) with Empire waist Brooklyn Museum

Empire silhouette, Empire line, Empire waist or just Empire is a style in clothing in which the dress has a fitted bodice ending just below the bust, giving a high-waisted appearance, and a gathered skirt which is long and loosely fitting but skims the body rather than being supported by voluminous petticoats.

While the style goes back to the late 18th century, the term "Empire silhouette" arose over a century later in early 20th-century Britain; here the word empire refers to the period of the First French Empire (1804–1815). The word "empire" is pronounced with a special quasi-French pronunciation /ɑːmˈpɪər/ in American fashion history but not in Commonwealth English. It was never used to describe the waistline at the time of its first use and is applied anachronistically to historical styles.

== History ==
The style began as part of Neoclassical fashion, reviving styles from Greco-Roman art which showed women wearing loose fitting rectangular tunics, known as peplos or the more common chiton, which were belted under the bust, providing support and a cool, comfortable outfit suitable for the warm climate.

The last few years of the 18th century first saw the style coming into fashion in Western and Central Europe (and European-influenced areas). In 1788, just before the Revolution, the court portraitist Louise Élisabeth Vigée Le Brun had held a "Greek supper" where the ladies wore plain white "Greek" tunics. Shorter classical hairstyles, where possible with curls, were less controversial and very widely adopted. Hair was now uncovered even outdoors; except for evening dress, bonnets or other coverings had typically been worn even indoors before. Thin Greek-style ribbons or fillets were used to tie or decorate the hair instead.

Empire dresses were light and loose, usually white, and were often made with short sleeves. A tie around the waistline, sitting just below the bust, was often in a different color. A long rectangular shawl or wrap, very often red with a decorative border in portraits, was also worn, and was lain around the midriff when seated—for which sprawling semi-recumbent postures were favored. By the turn of the 19th century, such styles had spread widely across Europe. In France the style was sometimes called "à la grecque" after the decorations found on the pottery and sculpture of Classical Greek art, though the empire dress had multiple sources, including Marie Antoinette's chemise à la reine, a simple white gown influenced by those worn by European women living abroad in warm climates, including the Americas. Napoleon used the dress in an imperial context, shifting its meaning from Greece to Rome in line with his political agenda during the Empire period.

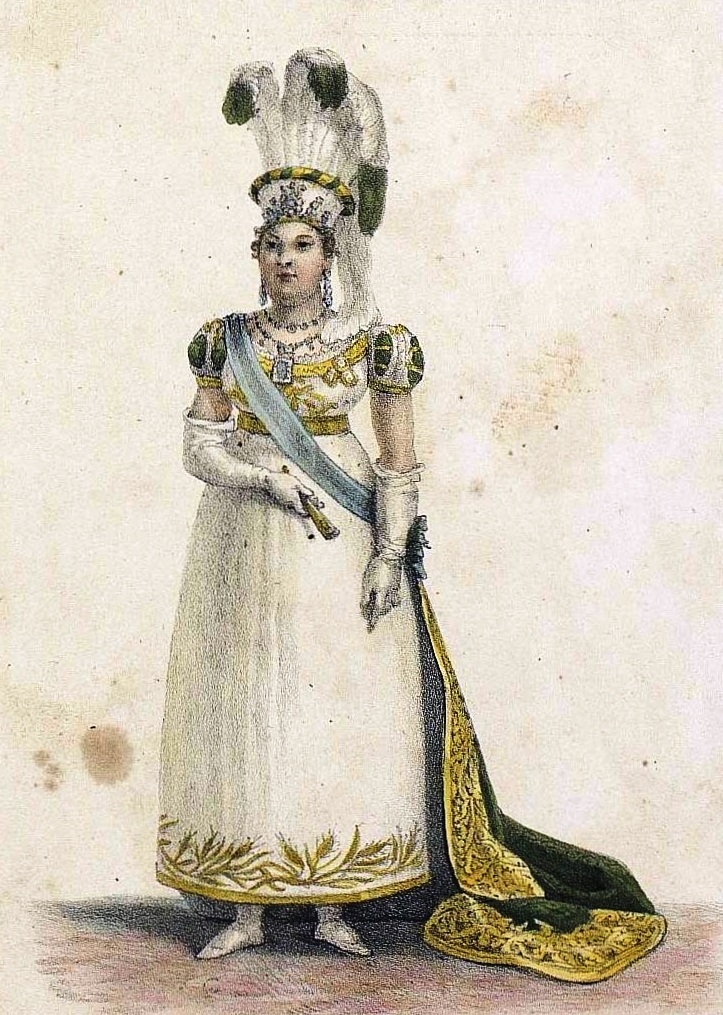
Empress Maria Leopoldina of Brazil in traditional Brazilian court dress, c. 1822

The adoption of this style led to a drastic contrast between 1790s fashions and the constricting and voluminous styles of the 1770s (with a rigid cylindrical torso above panniers). The change is probably partially due to the French political upheavals after 1789 (which encouraged the recovery of ancient virtues, and discouraged the type of ostentatious ornately luxurious display formerly common in aristocratic fashions). The early styles often featured entirely bare arms, as in the ancient exemplars, but from about 1800 short sleeves became more typical, initially sometimes transparent as in David's Portrait of Madame Récamier (1800), then puffed. The style evolved through the early nineteenth century until the early 1820s, becoming gradually less simple, after which the hourglass Victorian styles became more popular.

British women's styles (often referred to as "Regency") followed the same general trend of raised waistlines as French styles, even when the countries were at war. The style was very often worn in white to denote a high social status (especially in its earlier years); only women of the middling, gentry and aristocratic classes could afford to wear the pale, easily soiled garments of the era. The look was popularized in Britain by people like Emma, Lady Hamilton, who wore such garments for her performances of poses in imitation of classical antiquity ("attitudes"), which were a sensation throughout Europe. The high-waisted cut of the dress was also applied to outer garments, such as the pelisse. The Empire silhouette contributed to making clothes of the 1795–1820 period generally more streamlined and less cumbersome than fashionable clothes of the earlier 18th and later 19th centuries.

The 1960s saw a revival of the style, possibly reflecting the less strict social mores of the era, similar to when the 1920s "flapper" styles replaced the heavy corsetry of the early 1900s.

== See also ==
- 1750–1795 in Western fashion
- 1795–1820 in Western fashion
- Chiton
- Corset controversy
- Emma, Lady Hamilton
- High-rise (fashion)
- Peplos
- Spencer (clothing)
