= Corset controversy =

Arguments about corsets in the 19th century

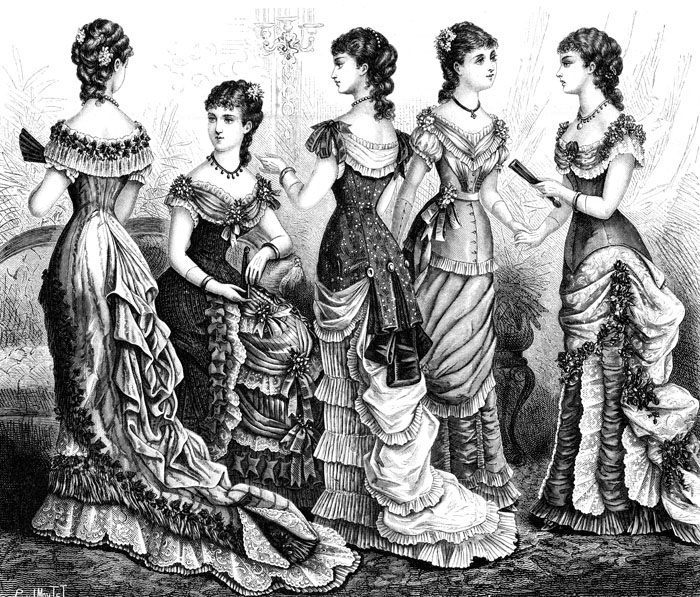
Women in 1870s gowns wearing corsets

Unhealthy overuse of corsets was a topic of public concern throughout the 19th century, at times escalating to a moral panic. Female fashion trends such as tightlacing or wasp waists encouraged excessively thin waists, leading to women possibly harming themselves to achieve certain bodily proportions.

== Background ==
Corsets, variously called a pair of bodys or stays, were worn by European women from the late 16th century onward, changing their form as fashions changed. In spite of radical change to fashion geographically and temporally, the corset or some derivative beneath an outer gown shaped the body or provided structure.

There were brief periods in which corsetry was not part of mainstream fashion. In the 1790s, there was an abrupt change to fashion as the Empire silhouette became fashionable. During the following Regency era, the highly supportive corsets of the early Georgian era were dismissed in favor of short garments worn primarily to support the breasts, leaving the waist and hips in their natural shape.

"Tight Lacing, or Fashion before Ease"

Beginning in the mid-1820s, women's fashion returned to the full skirts of the prior century. In a repudiation of the Empire silhouette, the waist became the central focus of female dress and the corset evolved to encompass the waist and hips. In addition, the advent of steel boning, clasps, and eyelets allowed wearers to lace their corsets tighter than ever before without damaging them. Doctors and much of the press deplored the garment in spite of continued use.

== Media ==
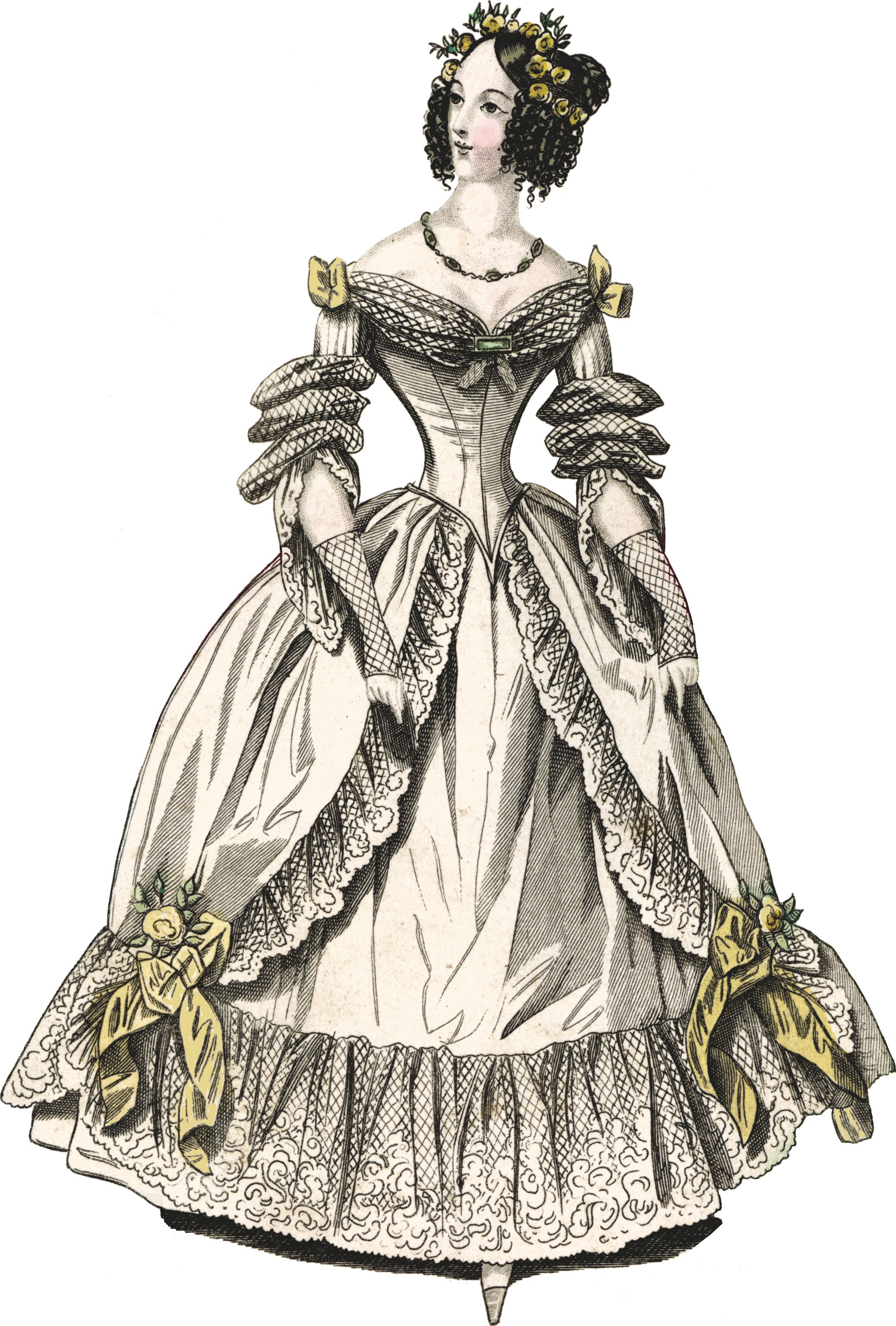
Evening dress, 1838

Wearing corsets has been subject to criticism since the era of tight lacing during the prior early 18th century. Cartoons of the period satirized the practice. However, by the 19th century, women were writing letters to publications expressing their views directly and articulately. The one-sided denunciation of the past turned into a dialogue. Women made their voices heard, sharing their experiences and their opinions, some in favor of the corset and even tight lacing, and some in disfavor of the restrictive garment. Newspapers and popular journals became the media for the exchange of hundreds of letters and articles concerning the corset.

Known as the "corset controversy" or the "corset question", the controversy spilled over multiple publications, countries and decades. Of particular concern was the issue of tight lacing. The flow of articles and letters waxed and waned over time, reaching a crescendo in the late 1860s, which may be taken to be the peak of the frenzy. However, the issue surfaced long before and continued long afterward. Throughout this period, advertisements in the same publications promoted the sale of corsets with enthusiasm.

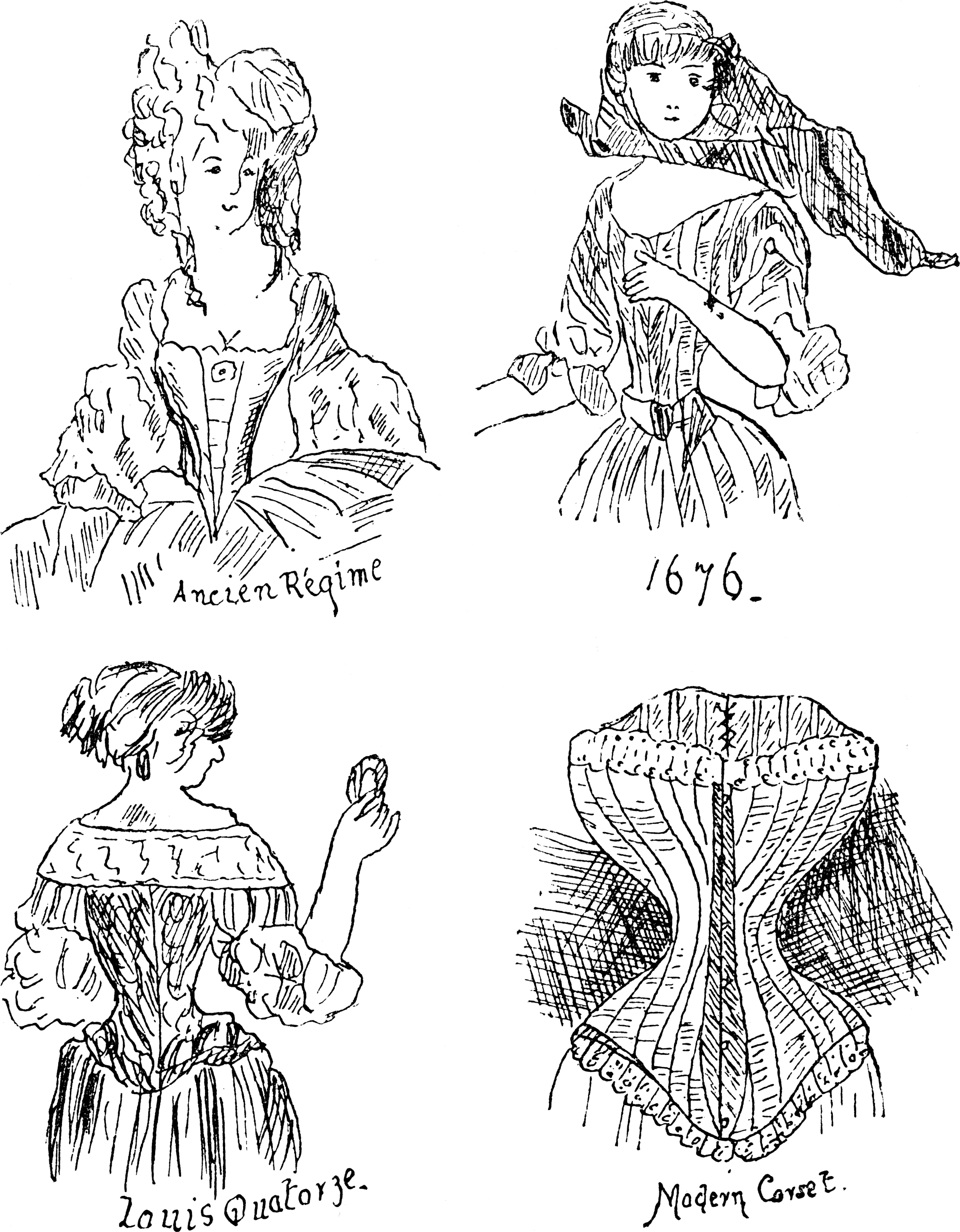
Changing form of the corset, published 1889

In the United Kingdom, publications in which the controversy raged included The Times, The Lancet, Queen, The Scotsman, Ladies Treasury, The Englishwomen's Domestic Magazine, and All the Year Round. In the United States, the Chicago Tribune commented that English journalists discussed both sides of the controversy "with very great fervor and very little common sense," though it published its own contributions. Other American newspapers and periodicals also participated, including The New York Times, The Washington Post, The Boston Globe, the Hartford Daily Courant, the North American Review, and The Saint Paul Daily Globe. Other parts of the English-speaking world joined from time to time, reprinting articles from England and America, as well as contributing their own. Even provincial newspapers such as the Amador Ledger of California, the Hobart Town Courier, the Otago Witness, and the Timaru Herald of New Zealand had their say.

This eruption of published discourse on this topic was a break from propriety norms at the time; particularly noted was the series of "corset correspondence" in The Englishwomen's Domestic Magazine, which ran from 1867 to 1874. This volume of correspondence has become influential in later perception of the practice of tightlacing, and corset usage in general, although doubt has been cast on the veracity of the letters, which were submitted anonymously. In this series of letters, a number of extreme tightlacing practices were described in salacious detail, including use of corsetry as punishment and of a sadomasochistic nature, resulting in waist sizes as low as 13 inches.

== Criticism ==
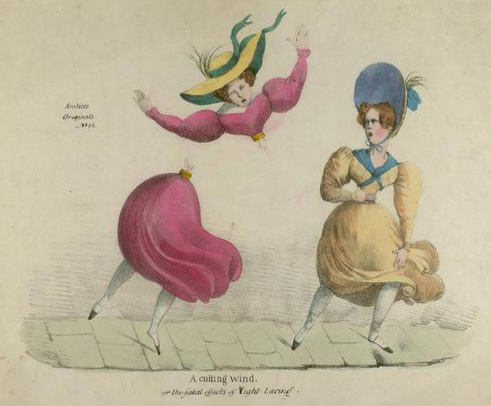
"A cutting wind, or the fatal effects of tight-lacing", a satirical cartoon from around 1820

The line between wearing corsets in general and tight lacing in particular was never drawn precisely. Many detractors denounced both, obviating the distinction, while many advocates endorsed both. Additionally, many women who wore corsets denied that they tight-laced, adding confusion to the controversy. The West Coast Times wrote that "consequences of tight lacing are universally admitted," yet ladies' denial persisted. They preferred to claim that their small waist was "a gift of Nature" and that they wear a corset for "comfortable, if not necessary support."

Although the discussion around this topic ran to the extremes at times, ultimately most agreed that some degree of corseting was beneficial and necessary, as women's bodies were believed to be weaker than men's. However, the degree of reduction and the regimen used to achieve the reduction were highly controversial, with many doctors blaming mothers for pushing their daughters to corset too early or too tightly, and many mothers bemoaning their daughters' insistence in tightlacing despite their warnings. Few openly claimed to tightlace; the accounts from The Englishwomen's Domestic Magazine of proud tightlacing practitioners drew much ire and controversy. Only a few argued that corsets should be entirely discarded.

== The dress reform movement ==
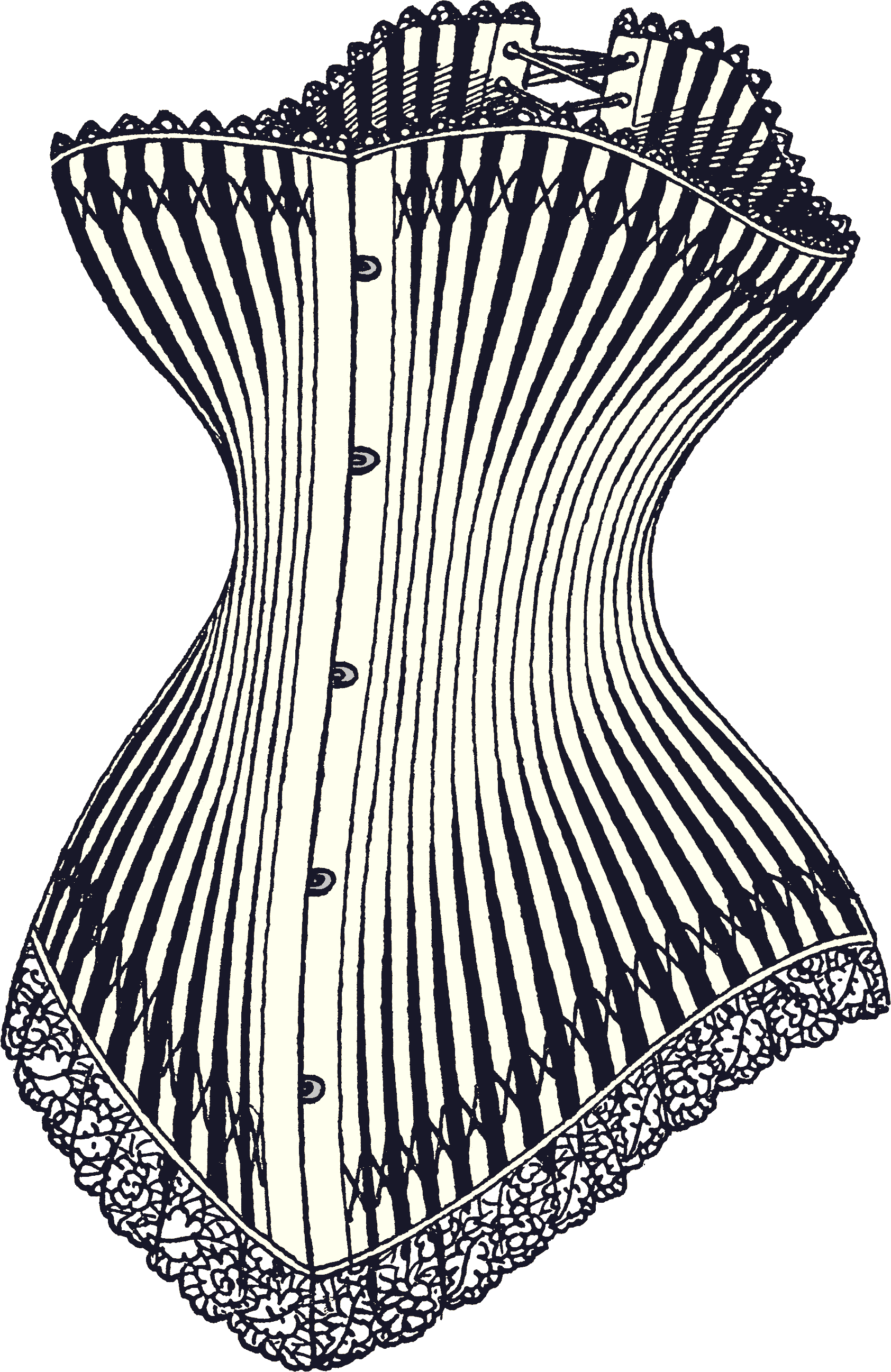
Corset 1878

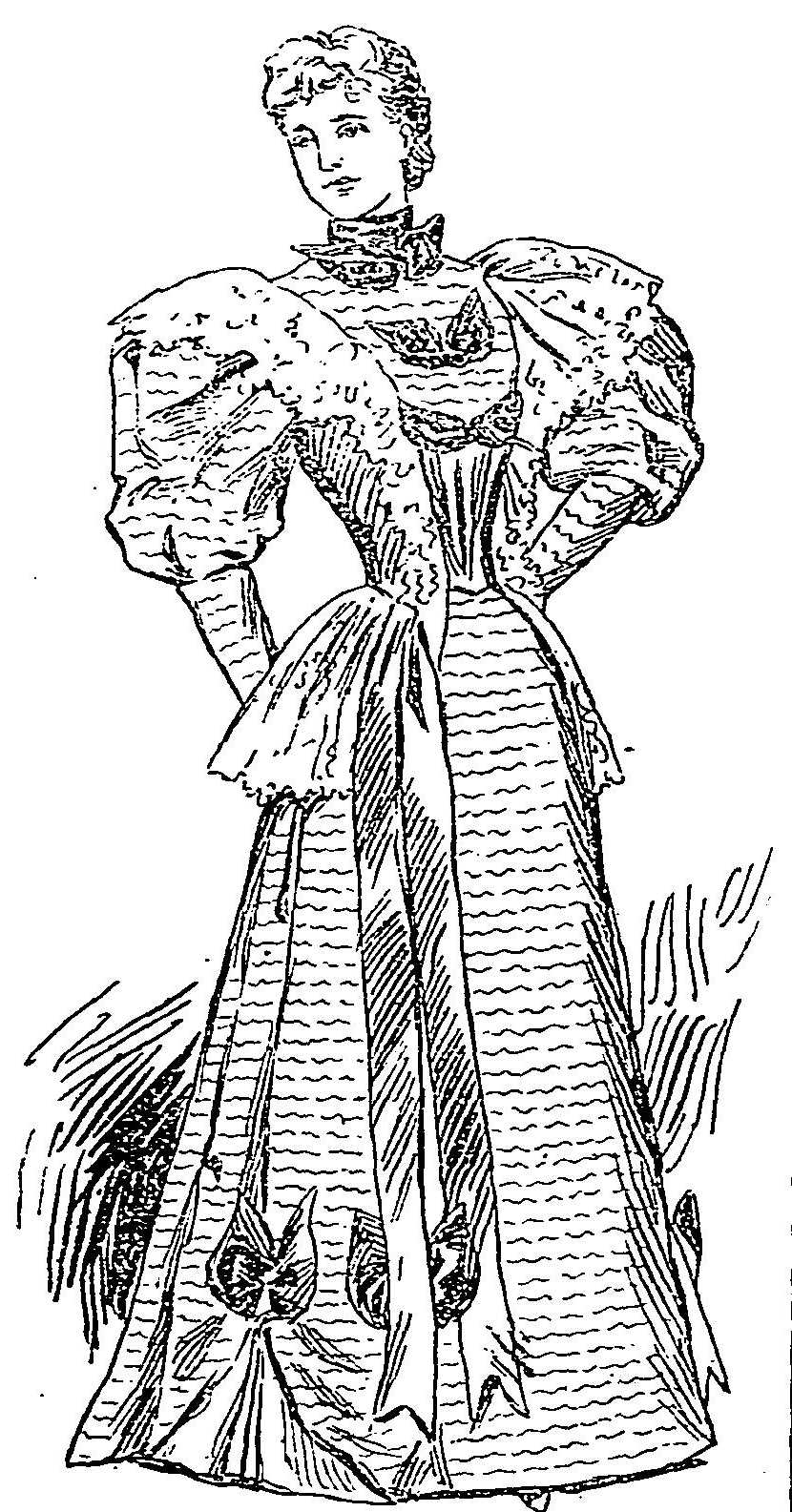
Afternoon dress circa 1894

Advocates of dress reform deplored the impractical and restrictive fashions of the time. The bloomer dress was a mid-century attempt at rational clothing for women. It attracted considerable ridicule in the press and relatively few adopters. Other attempts at dress reform fared no better.

Various dress reformers turned to the printing press. In 1873, Elizabeth Stuart Phelps Ward wrote:

Burn up the corsets! ... No, nor do you save the whalebones, you will never need whalebones again. Make a bonfire of the cruel steels that have lorded it over your thorax and abdomens for so many years and heave a sigh of relief, for your emancipation I assure you, from this moment has begun.

Louisa May Alcott devoted Chapter 18 ("Fashion and Physiology") of her 1875 young adult fiction, Eight Cousins, to advocating for dress reform in the form of the "freedom suit," which is described as being different from and more socially acceptable than bloomers. The young main character, Rose Campbell, is under the guardianship of her physician uncle Alec. However, her aunt Clara wishes Rose to dress appropriately to her position as an heiress, and one day gives her a fashionable outfit to try. Rose ultimately rejects it in favor of Alec's freedom suit, consisting of close-fitting pantaloons and shirt under a long-skirted petticoat and dress. Earlier in the novel, Rose had been wearing a tight belt to keep her waist small, which Alec insisted she stop doing for the sake of her health (Chapter 5, "A Belt and a Box"). When Clara tries to convince her to wear a corset, Alec is furious.

He closed the door with a shrug, but before anyone could speak, his quick eye fell upon an object which caused him to frown, and demand in an indignant tone, "After all I have said, were you really going to tempt my girl with those abominable things?"

"I thought we put them away when she wouldn't wear them," murmured Mrs. Clara, whisking a little pair of corsets out of sight with guilty haste. "I only brought them to try, for Rose is growing stout, and will have no figure if it is not attended to soon," she added, with an air of calm conviction that roused the Doctor still more, for this was one of his especial abominations.

"Growing stout! Yes, thank Heaven, she is, and shall continue to do it, for Nature knows how to mold a woman better than any corset-maker, and I won't have her interfered with. My dear Clara, have you lost your senses that you can for a moment dream of putting a growing girl into an instrument of torture like this?" and with a sudden gesture he plucked forth the offending corsets from under the sofa cushion, and held them out with the expression one would wear on beholding the thumbscrews or the rack of ancient times.

"Don't be absurd, Alec. There is no torture about it, for tight lacing is out of fashion, and we have nice, sensible things nowadays. Everyone wears them; even babies have stiffened waists to support their weak little backs," began Mrs. Clara, rushing to the defense of the pet delusion of most women.

"I know it, and so the poor little souls have weak backs all their days, as their mothers had before them. It is vain to argue the matter, and I won't try, but I wish to state, once for all, that if I ever see a pair of corsets near Rose, I'll put them in the fire, and you may send the bill to me."

But dress reform had little mainstream impact. Fashion continued to emphasize the waist and, so long as it did, the corset continued to be regarded as an indispensable of dress. An unusually perceptive reformer described the situation in an address to the National Christian League in 1895. Her speech was reported in The New York Times:

Women's Slavery to Fashion – She Admires Ideal Garments but will not Wear Them

Mrs. Margaret Stanton Lawrence ... told of the artist who spent years in inventing a dress for woman that would be at once comfortable, convenient, and beautiful. Success crowned his efforts, but alas! who would invent the woman to wear this ideal garment! The dress was delightful, all women admitted, and filled every requirement, but – alas again for them! their husbands would not walk in the streets with the wearers of such a garb, their fashionable friends begged to be spared the visits of such unconventional creatures, and the clergymen in the churches asked that their congregations be not disturbed by thoughts of a woman's dress.

It seemed that change would be glacially slow at best. A year later, The New York Times wrote:

For the Liberated Women; Those Valiant Ones Who Will Give Up the Binding Corset. More and More Women Are Doffing Their Stays – But It Still Takes High Courage to Join Their Ranks.

The receipt of several letters asking The Times to give some designs suitable for making up gowns to be worn without corsets has suggested the article here presented. The leaven is working among women: Many have discarded them, many more, mothers, who feel that it is too late for them to change, are persuading their growing daughters to omit their adoption. ... Human nature is weak, very weak, when it comes to the question of personal appearance, and having for generations adopted the standard of a tapering waist as a mark of feminine beauty of figure, it is going to take character, perseverance, religion even to counteract this. ...

"One of the most pathetic speeches that I have listened to in a long time", said a woman recently, "was that made by a friend to me the other day. We were discussing hygienic dress and the use of disuse of corsets. I remarked casually and tritely that it took a good deal of moral courage to give them up. 'Moral courage!' she repeated, 'it takes wrestling with the Lord. There is no plea I have made oftener of my Heavenly Father than that He would give me strength to persevere in this thing'".

== End of the controversy ==
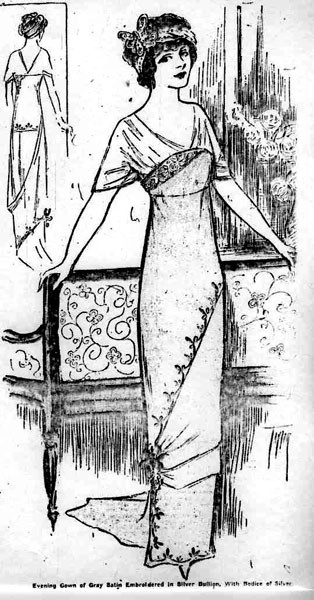
Hobble skirt circa 1912

From 1908 to 1914, the fashionable narrow-hipped and narrow-skirted silhouette necessitated the lengthening of the corset at its lower edge. A new type of corset covered the thighs and changed the position of the hip, making the waist appear higher and wider. The new fashion was considered uncomfortable, cumbersome, and furthermore required the use of strips of elastic fabric. The development of rubberized elastic materials in 1911 helped the girdle replace the corset. This was the huge turnaround for the history of the waist trainer.

The corset controversy changed in the early 20th century when the world of fashion circled back to styles reminiscent of the Empire silhouette. Fashionable dress was fluid and soft, with flowing lines. What rational dress reform was unable to accomplish in decades of rhetoric, the wheel of changing fashion brought about almost overnight. The waist became unimportant and the waist-restricting corset lost its significance.

Paul Poiret was a leader in this movement. He replaced the corset with the hobble skirt, which, while equally restrictive, was different and thus readily adopted in an era eager for change. In his autobiography, Poiret wrote

It was in the name of Liberty that I proclaimed the fall of the corset and the adoption of the brassiere, which since then, has won the day. Yes, I freed the bust, but I shackled the legs.

The hobble skirt lasted but a few years, but its adoption marked the beginning of the end. Other designers such as Madeleine Vionnet, Mariano Fortuny, and Coco Chanel soon followed with simple comfortable fashions that freed the entire woman. With their adoption into mainstream fashion, the corset controversy receded into a historical curiosity while the controversy about bras had just begun.

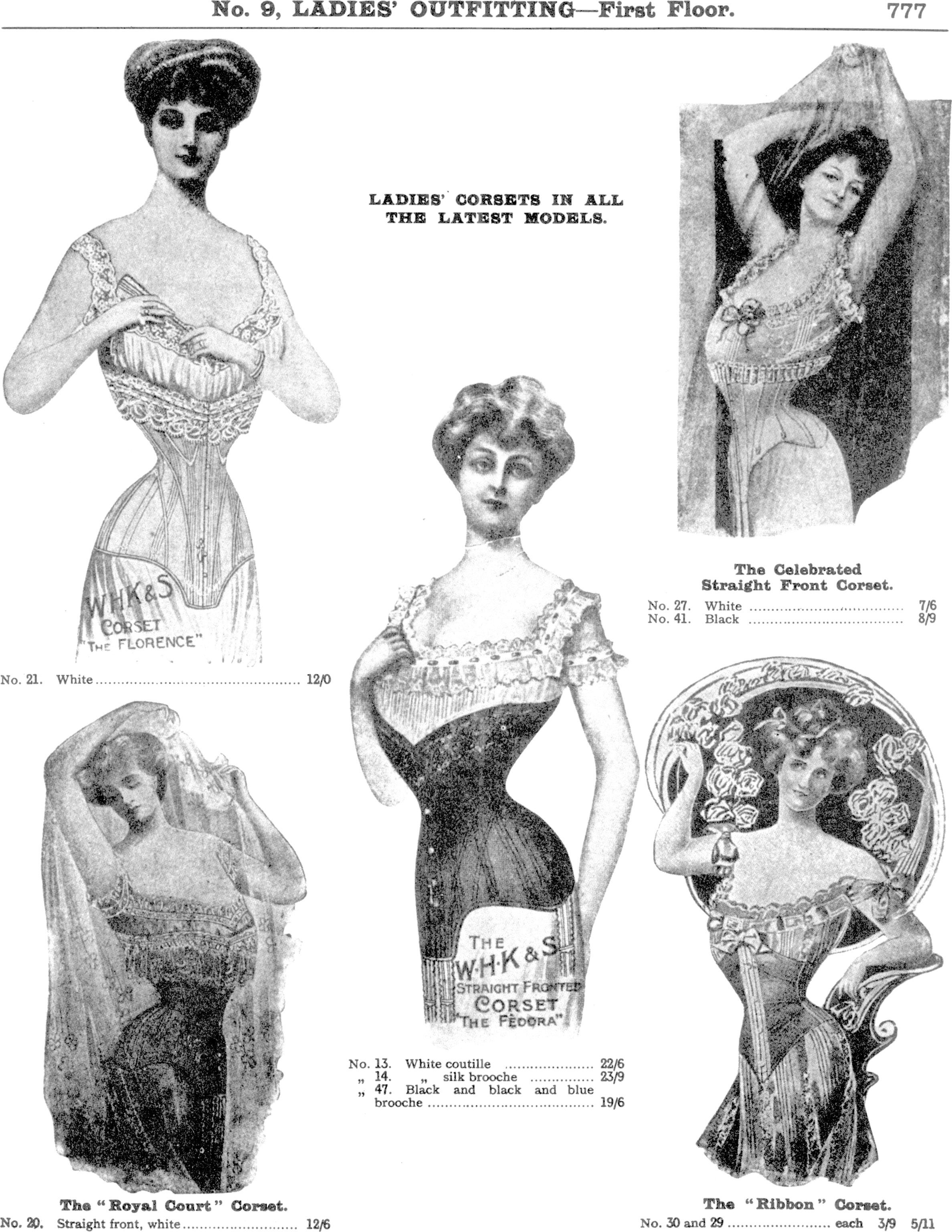
"Ladies' Corsets in All the Latest Models"

== See also ==
- History of corsets
- Hourglass corset
- Tightlacing
- Victorian dress reform
- Victorian fashion
- Wasp waist
- Swedish Dress Reform Society
