= Waistline (clothing) =

Line between upper and lower portions of a garment

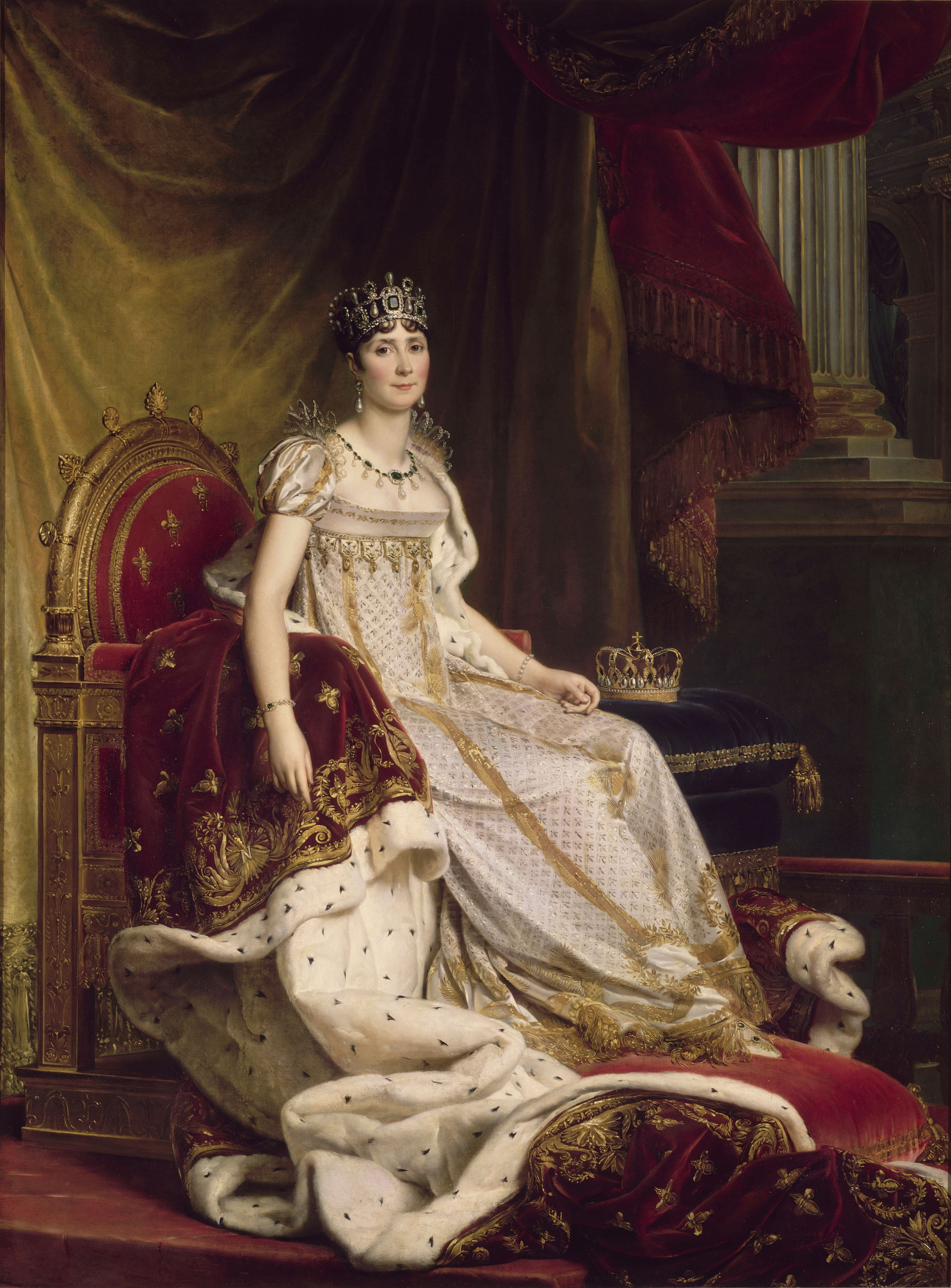
Joséphine de Beauharnais wearing a dress with an empire waist.

The waistline is the line of demarcation between the upper and lower portions of a garment, which notionally corresponds to the natural waist but may vary with fashion from just below the bust to below the hips. The waistline of a garment is often used to accentuate different features. The waistline is also important as a boundary at which shaping darts (such as those over the bust and in the back) can be ended.

== Types of waistlines ==
Similar to necklines, waistlines may be grouped by their shape, depth, and location of the body.

- None: The princess seams style of dress needs no waistline at all, since it does its shaping without darts, by joining edges of different curvature. The resulting "princess seams" typically run vertically from the shoulder (or under the arm) over the bust point and down to the lower hem. This creates a long, slimming look, often seen in dresses with an "A-line" silhouette.
- Diagonal: An asymmetrical waistline that runs across the body diagonally. Usually the highest point is below the natural waistline.
- Drop waist: A low, horizontal waistline that usually falls near the level of the upper hips. Balances the upper and lower bodies, and adds to the visual impression of height by lengthening the torso. Common in 1920s silhouettes.
- Empire: A high waistline that cuts horizontally across the body, just below the bust. This waistline gives a long, slender look and excellent fabric drape in the skirt and allows for short, inconspicuous shaping darts. This waistline was popular in Jane Austen's time; see Empire silhouette.
- Raised: A horizontal waistline that falls significantly above (>1 in.) the natural waist.
- Natural: A horizontal waistline that falls at the natural waist and tends to make the wearer seem shorter by visually dividing the figure in half.
- V-shaped: A generally flattering waistline, especially for figures with notable curvature. Also known as the Basque waistline or the Antebellum waistline.
- U-shaped: A softer, less pronounced version of the Basque waistline.
- Inverted V-shaped: Starts high in the center and drops at the sides and can fall as high as the bustline (e.g., paired with a low V neckline to give a "bowtie" look), but usually found near the hips (e.g., extending Bolero curves in the bodice).
- Inverted U-shaped: A softer, less used version of the inverted-V waistline, usually a gentle downwards curve.

== Secure mechanisms ==
Waistlines can be secured with a variety of methods:

- Button
- Clasp
- Drawstring
- Elastic
- Knot
- Zipper

== See also ==
- Hemline
- Low-rise (fashion)
- Midriff
- Navel in popular culture
- Neckline
