= Dart (sewing) =

Pointed fold used in sewing

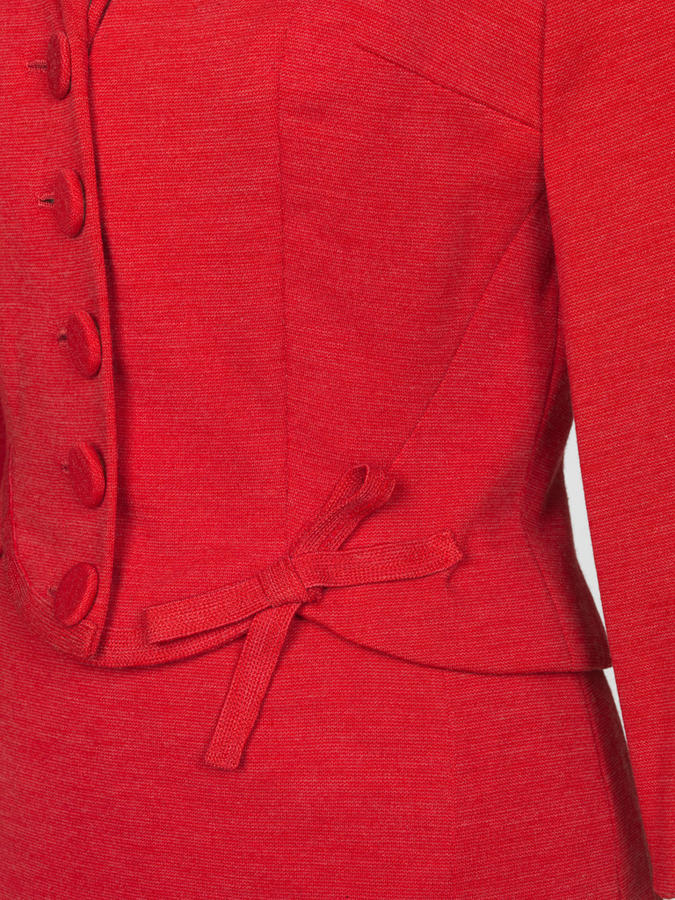
Suit by Pierre Balmain, 1957, with shaping darts at bust and waist.

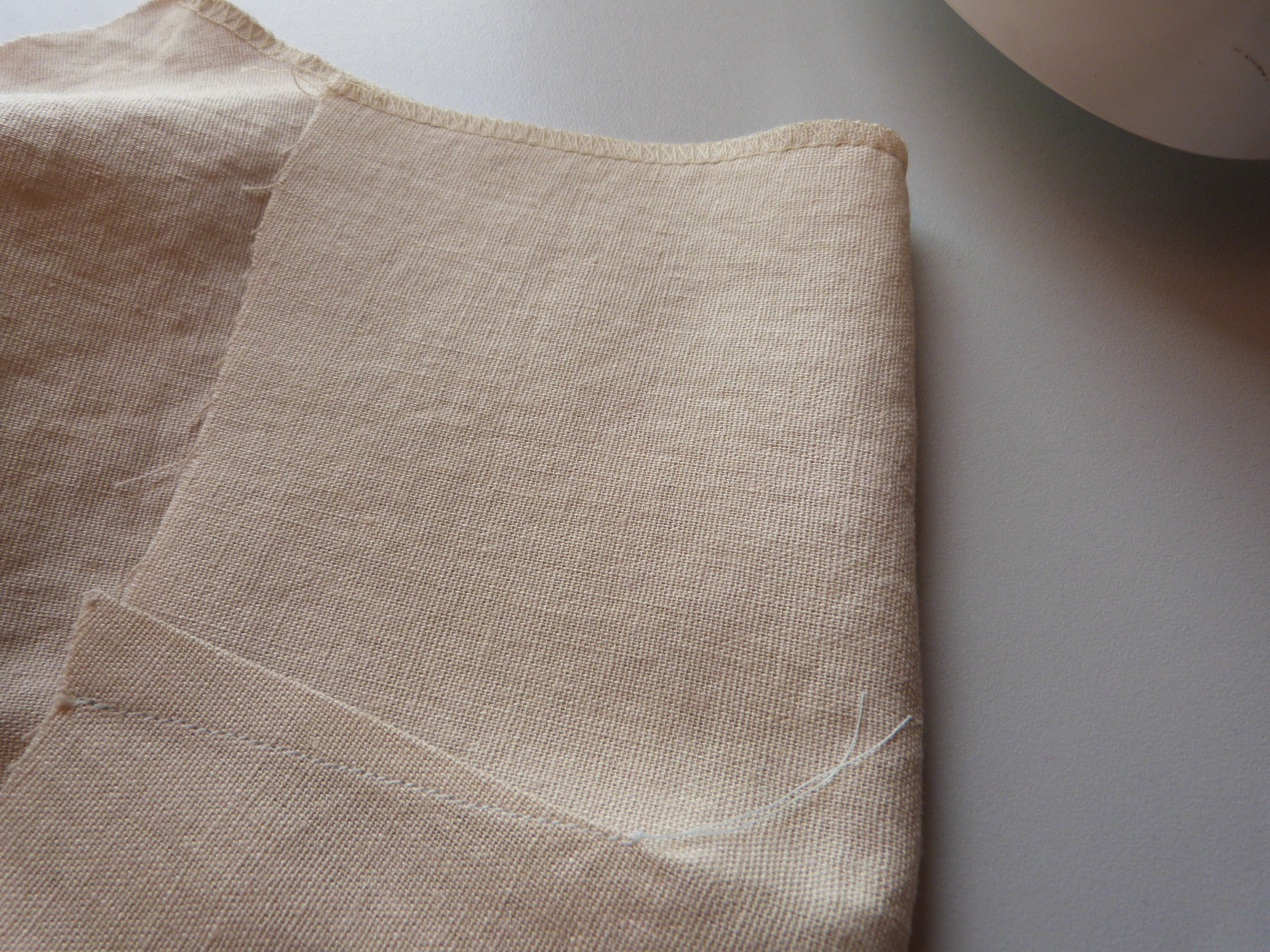
The reverse side of fabric showing where a dart has been taken in and stitched to tailor the shape of a garment to the wearer.

Darts are folds (tucks coming to a point) sewn into fabric to take in ease and provide shape to a garment, especially for a woman's bust. They are used frequently in all sorts of clothing to tailor the garment to the wearer's shape, or to make an innovative shape in the garment. Fabric may be thought of as flat, and a dart has the effect of removing a wedge shaped piece and pulling the edges of that wedge together to create a shallow cone. This effect can be seen quite easily with a paper pattern by pulling together the edges of a dart intake as it would be sewn. Since fabric is generally more flexible than paper, the fabric will shift around the apex of the cone and form a softer, but still curved, shape. In a garment, a dart ends in a point at a full area of the body.

A dart in a flat pattern has two important properties: its point, or the point in the pattern at which the dart aims or converges, and the intake, or the amount of fabric taken in or removed. Since the dart can extend toward any edge of the pattern without affecting fit, the length of the dart intake at the edge of the fabric is not a good measure of dart intake. Rather, the angle subtracted from the pattern by the dart is what determines the dart's intake.

== Manipulating darts in flat patterns ==
As long as the focal point of a dart and its intake remain the same, a dart can be rotated around its focal point, or stylized in one of several ways without affecting the fit of the garment.

=== Slash-and-spread dart rotation ===
An easy way to rotate a dart on a flat pattern is to slice a straight line from the dart point to another edge of the pattern (the slash). The two pieces thus created can then be pivoted (spread) at the dart point to shift the dart to the position of the slash.

=== Pin and pivot dart rotation ===
The pin and pivot dart rotation technique requires tracing a new pattern from the original. First, the pattern with the dart to be rotated is set on top of another piece of paper on which the new pattern will be traced. A pin is pressed into the dart point to hold that point in place. Then one leg of the original dart and an arbitrary part of the original pattern is traced onto the paper. This tracing starts from the one dart leg and continues from there to the new point where the dart will reach the outside of the pattern piece. The pattern is then rotated around the pinned dart point until the other dart leg lines up with the traced dart leg. Tracing can then continue from the same spot on the original pattern. The pattern is then removed and the new dart legs drawn between the dart point (marked by the pin hole) and the gap in the pattern created during rotation.

=== Dart equivalents ===
Pleats or gathers in the fabric can be used for the same purpose as a normal stitched dart. These are called dart equivalents. Darts can also be worked into style lines.

== Named dart styles ==
Two kinds of darts are common in blouses for women:

- Vertical darts—These are sewn from the bottom of the blouse to a point generally around the bustline. This type of dart may be found in the front, rarely in the back of a garment and are used by the garment maker to pull in the bottom of the blouse towards the wearer's waist.
  - Fisheye darts
- Bust darts—These are short triangle folds that provide space for breasts such that the fabric under the breasts isn't hanging, rather is fitting closer to the wearer. There are several subtypes of bust line dart:
  - Center
  - Waistline
  - French
  - Side seam
  - Armhole
  - Neckline
  - Shoulder
  - T-dart
  - Inverted T-dart

In the early 1950s, the New York City firm of Evan-Picone pioneered the use of darts in the pockets of women's clothing. The darts help keep the pocket open and thus more easily accessed, reducing the chance of rips or tears.

== See also ==
- Princess seams
