= Polaire =

French actress (1874–1939)

- Polaire, circa 1900.
- Born: Émilie Marie Bouchaud; 14 May 1874; Agha, Algiers, French Algeria
- Died: 14 October 1939 (aged 65); Champigny-sur-Marne, Paris, France
- Occupations: Singer, actress

Émilie Marie Bouchaud (14 May 1874 – 14 October 1939), better known by her stage name Polaire, was a French singer and actress, who became internationally known. She performed also in the United States and London, and in films.

She was notable for her wasp waist which, achieved through corsetry, reportedly measured less than 16 inches (41 cm). She was also known for her eccentric stage presence, which generated mixed receptions.

== Biography ==
=== Early life ===
Émilie Marie Bouchaud was born in Agha, Algiers, French Algeria on 14 May 1874; according to her memoirs she was one of eleven children. Only four – Émilie, her two brothers Edmond and Marcel, and a sister, Lucile – survived infancy. Their father died of typhoid fever when Émilie was five. Their widowed mother, unable to support the four children, temporarily placed them with their grandmother in Algiers. Bouchaud's brother Marcel died shortly after.

In 1889, after their mother began a relationship with a man named Emmanuel Borgia, she took her children with her when she moved with him to Paris. There her mother found work, and also tried to find domestic employment for her eldest daughter. Eventually however, after her sister Lucile fell sick and died, Émilie was sent back to her grandmother in Algiers.

Borgia, her mother, and Edmond, the only surviving sibling, remained in Paris. Émilie was unhappy and in September 1890 ran away to rejoin her mother in France. Afraid of meeting her mother's partner, Borgia (whom she accuses in her memoirs of having tried to molest her), she first approached her brother Edmond.

He had already gained some fame as a café-concert singer under the name of 'Dufleuve'. With his help Bouchard at about age 17 auditioned successfully for her first job as a café singer.

=== Career ===
Polaire photographed by Léopold-Émile Reutlinger

Polaire's career in the entertainment industry stretched from the early 1890s to the mid-1930s, and encompassed the range from music-hall singer to stage and film actress. Her most successful period professionally was from the mid-1890s to the beginning of the Great War (First World War).

Adopting the stage name Polaire ("Pole Star"), she worked first as a music-hall singer and dancer. One of her earliest hits was performing the French version of "Ta-ra-ra Boom-de-ay". Having quickly made a name for herself – artist Toulouse-Lautrec portrayed her on a magazine cover in 1895 – Polaire briefly visited New York, appearing there as a chanteuse at various venues, but without achieving major success.

On her return to Paris, she extended her range and gained acting roles in serious theatre. Her first major appearance was in 1902, at the Théâtre des Bouffes Parisiens, in the title role of a play based on Colette's Claudine à Paris. A comedic actress, Polaire became one of the major celebrities of her day. Later, as cinema developed, she appeared in several films.

Polaire performing Colette's play, Claudine à Paris

In 1909, Polaire was cast in her first silent-film role in Moines et guerriers (Monks and Warriors). In 1910 she returned to the stage, appearing in London and later in New York. (1910 was the date of her first visit as a celebrity to the U.S.; publicity releases did not mention her earlier appearances in 1895.) In 1912, back in France, she was offered a role in a film by the up-and-coming young director Maurice Tourneur. She appeared in six of his films in 1912 and 1913. After returning to the musical stage, she sailed back to the US for a second tour.

Crossing the Atlantic again, she returned to London to perform at the Coliseum Theatre. In 1915 Polaire made frequent appearances in London, and was involved in wartime fund-raising efforts. She returned to films in 1922 but, in the declining years of her career, had to be content with lesser roles.

Her precise filmography is difficult to determine due to confusion between her and a younger Italian actress with the screen name "Pauline Polaire", who also featured in early films. Her last film appearance was in 1935 in Arènes joyeuses, directed by Karl Anton.

=== Appearance ===
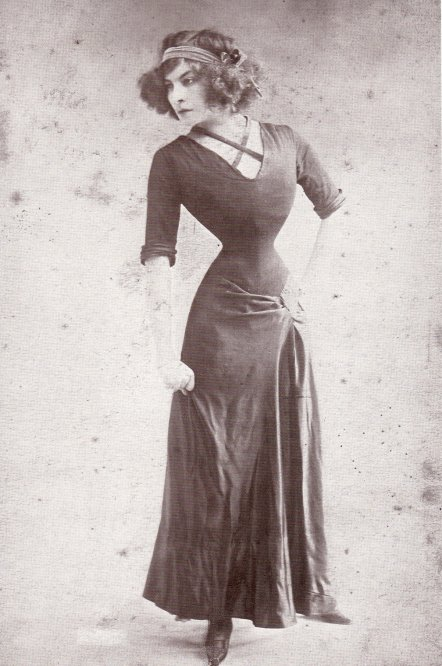
Polaire showing off her wasp waist, c. 1900

Polaire was skilled in using her appearance to attract attention. In her early days as a café singer in the 1890s, she wore very short skirts and also cropped her hair, fashions that did not become common in the rest of society until the 1920s. A brunette, she wore unusually heavy eye makeup, deliberately evocative of the Arab world. At a time when tightlacing among women was in vogue, she was famous for her tiny, corsetted waist, which was reported to have a circumference no greater than 16 inches (41 cm). That accentuated her large bust, which was said to measure 38 inches (97 cm). She stood 165 centimetres (5 ft 5 in) tall. Her striking appearance, both on and off stage, contributed to her celebrity.

For her 1910 supposed "debut" in New York, she provocatively allowed herself to be billed in the advance publicity as "the ugliest woman in the world". When departing on a transatlantic liner, she was apparently accompanied by a "black slave".

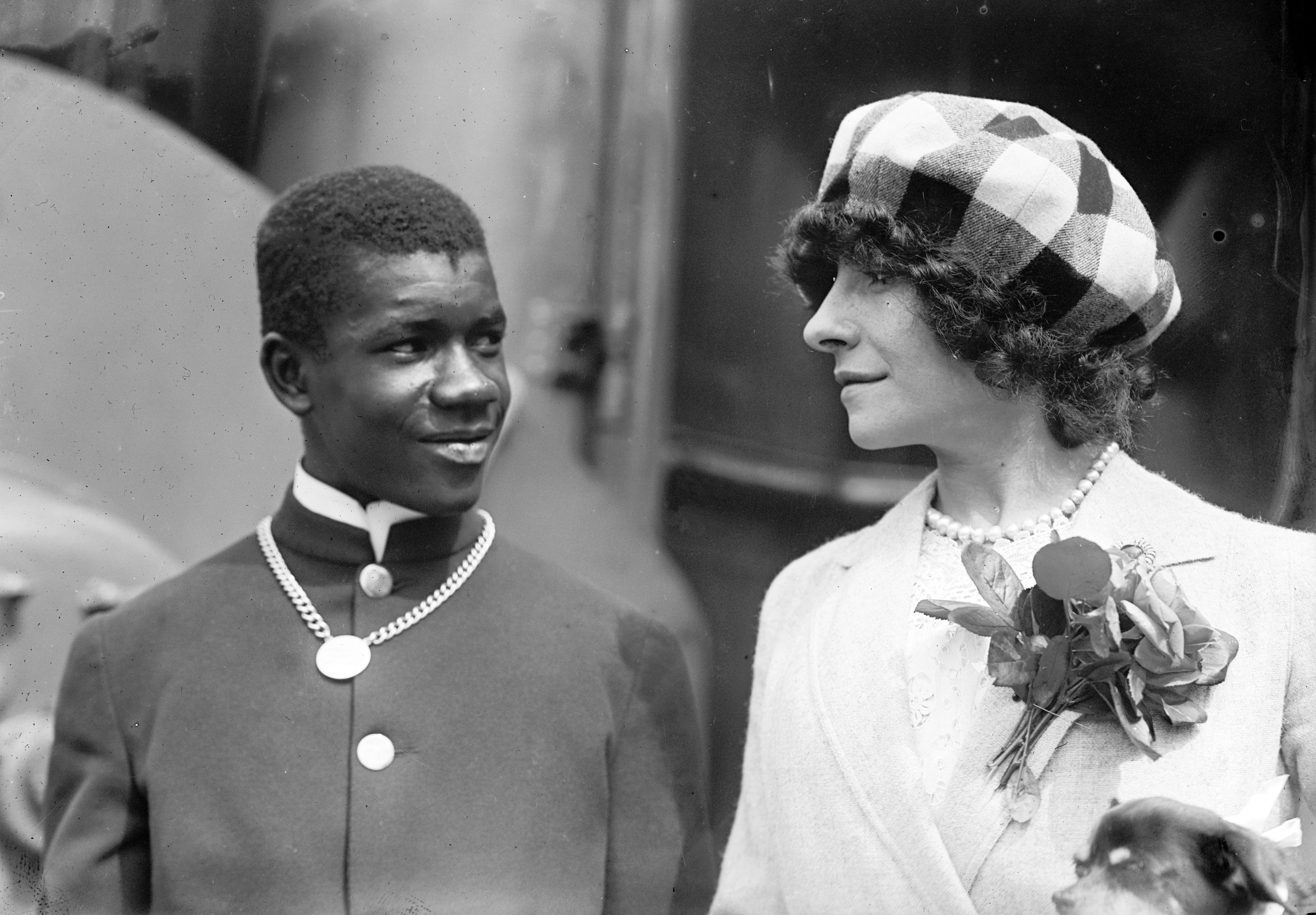
Polaire with the young man she provocatively called her "slave", photographed at the end of her 1910 tour of the United States.

Returning to America in 1913, she brought a diamond-collared pet pig, Mimi, and wore a nose-ring. Talk of her figure and her lavish overdressing in fur coats and dazzling jewels preceded her appearances wherever she went. Jean Lorrain said of her:

Polaire! The agitating and agitated Polaire! The tiny slip of a woman that you know, with the waist slender to the point of pain, of screaming out loud, of breaking in two, in a spasmically tight bodice, the prettiest slimness ... And, under the aureole of an extravagant masher's hat, orange and plumed with iris leaves, the great voracious mouth, the immense black eyes, ringed, bruised, discoloured, the incandescence of her pupils, the bewildered nocturnal hair, the phosphorus, the sulphur, the red pepper of that ghoulish, Salome-like face, the agitating and agitated Polaire! What a devilish mimic, what a coffee-mill and what a belly-dancer! Yellow skirt tucked high, gloved in open-work stockings, Polaire skips, flutters, wriggles, arches from the hips, the back, the belly, mimes every kind of shock, twists, coils, rears, twirls...trembling like a stuck wasp, miaows, faints to what music and what words! The house, frozen with stupor, forgets to applaud.

Portrait of Polaire painted by Juan Sala, Paris, 1910

She was a frequent subject for artists; those who painted her include Henri de Toulouse-Lautrec, Antonio de La Gandara, Leonetto Cappiello, Rupert Carabin, Mme. Dreyfus Gonzales and Jean Sala.

=== Death ===
Polaire's finances suffered from a series of actions by the French tax authorities, and she struggled to find stage or screen roles as she aged. She may have suffered from depression.

She died on 14 October 1939, aged 65, in Champigny-sur-Marne, Val-de-Marne, France. Her body was buried at the Cimetière du Centre, in the eastern Paris suburb of Champigny-sur-Marne.

== Partial discography ==
All songs are included in the compilation album, Eugénie Buffet et Polaire: Succès et Raretés (1918-1936), released under a French record label, Chansophone.

- Allo Chéri (Boyer–Stamper) - Pathé 4970 - Matrix No. 2485 - 8 May 1918
- Pour être heureux (Yvain) - Aérophone - No. 1467 - 1920
- La Glu (Richepin–Fragerole) - Aérophone - No. 1468 - 1920
- Tchike Tchike (Scotto) - Odéon 75143 - 1923
- Pour être heureux (Yvain) - Odéon 75143 - Matrix No. K1-510 - 1923
- Nocturne (Nozière) - Gramophone K-5798 - Matrix No. BS 4432-1 et 4433-2 - 1929
- La Glu (Richepin–Fragerole) - Polydor 521531 - Matrix No. 2170 BK - 1929
- Le P'tit Savoyard - Polydor 521531 - Matrix No. 2170 BK - 1929
- Le Train du rêve (Aubret–Lenoir) - Parlophone 22716 - Matrix No. Pa 106124-2 - 1930
- Le Premier Voyage (Lenoir) - Parlophone 22716 - Matrix No. Pa 106165-2 - 1930
- La Prière de la Charlotte (Jehan Rictus; arr. Warms) - Cristal 6263 - Matrix No. CP 2082 and 2083 - 1936

== Selected filmography ==
- Le dernier pardon (1913)
- Les gaîtés de l'escadron (1913)
- Soeurette (1914)
- Monsieur Lecoq (1914)
- Le masque du vice (1917)
- Amour... amour... (1932)
- Happy Arenas (1935)

== See also ==
- Antonio de La Gandara
- Tightlacing
- Corset
