= History of corsets =

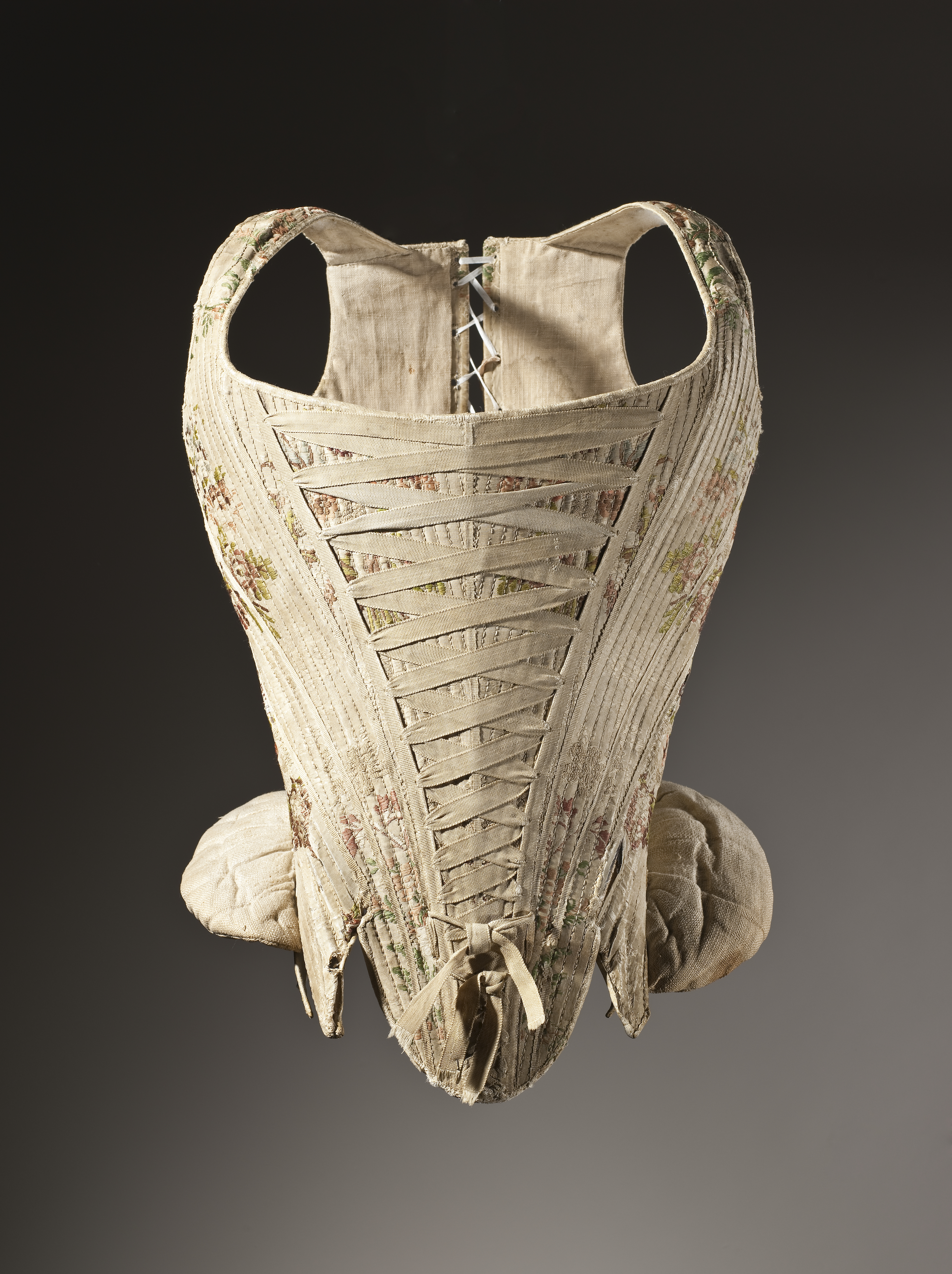
Woman's stays c. 1730–1740. Silk plain weave with supplementary weft-float patterning, stiffened with whalebone. Los Angeles County Museum of Art, M.63.24.5.

The corset is a supportive undergarment. It was standard in women's fashion in Europe for several centuries and served to shape the body and support upright posture, evolving in form as fashion trends changed. Depending on the era and location, the corset has been called various terms such as a pair of bodies, stays, or corsets.

A pair of bodies or stays, as they were known at the time, first became popular in sixteenth-century Europe, and created in the wearer a conical shape with a flattened bust. The wasp-waisted garment that is now associated with the term "corset" reached the zenith of its popularity in the Victorian era. While the corset has typically been worn as an undergarment, it has occasionally been used as an outer-garment, as can be seen in the national dress of some European countries.

== Etymology ==
The English word corset is derived from the diminutive of the Old French word corps, meaning "body," which itself derives from the Latin corpus. The term "corset” was in use in the late 14th century, from the French "corset" which meant "a kind of laced bodice." The meaning of it as a "stiff supporting and constricting undergarment for the waist, worn chiefly by women to shape the figure," dates from 1795. The term "stays" was frequently used in English circa 1600 until the early twentieth century, and was used interchangeably with corset in the Renaissance. The term "jumps," deriving from the French word jupe "short jacket," referred to stays without boning, which were less structured and typically laced in the front.

== Before the 16th century ==
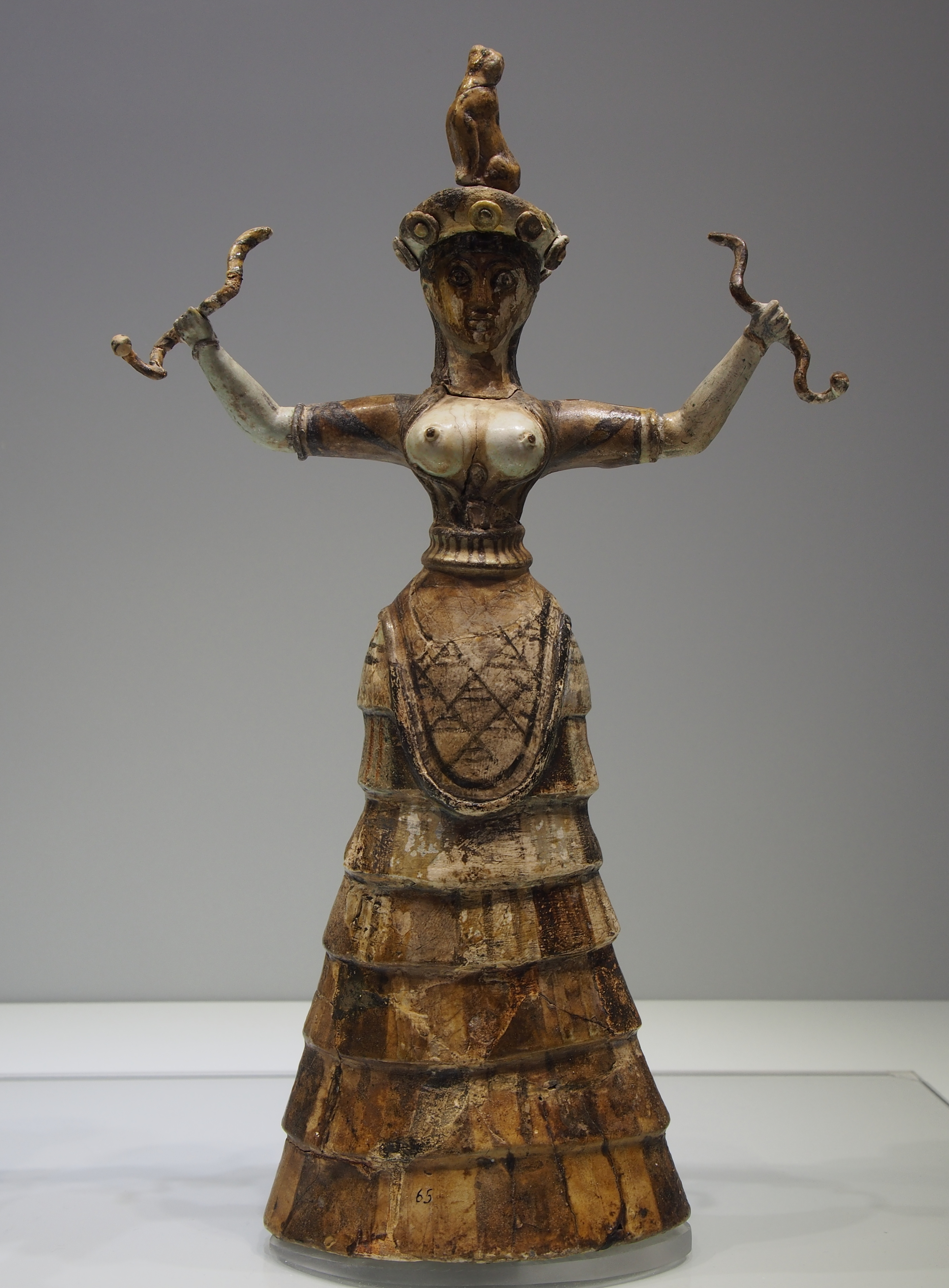
Figurine of Minoan snake goddess (or priestess), wearing a corset-like garment, from the palace of Knossos, Crete: c.1600 BCE

The earliest known representation of a possible corset appears on a figurine from Minoan art made circa 1600 BCE. The article of clothing depicted resembles a corset, but is worn as an outer garment, and leaves the breasts exposed.

Corsets have been used for centuries among the Circassians and Abkhaz tribes of the Caucasus region. They were used to "beautify" women and also to ensure modesty. Corsets were laced tightly with as many as fifty laces, and had to be worn from childhood until the wedding night. When the marriage was consummated, a groom had to slowly and carefully undo each lace to demonstrate self-control.

== 16th and 17th centuries ==
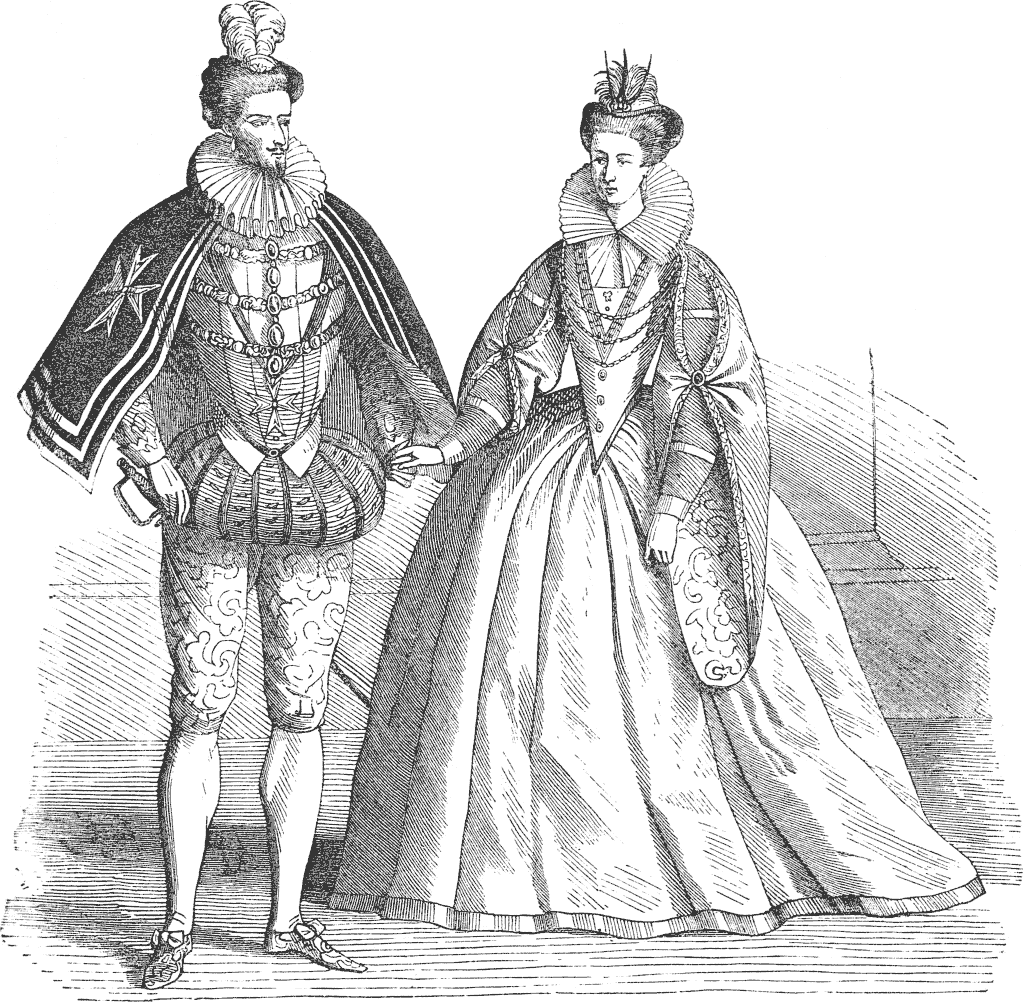
Henry III of France and Louise of Lorraine

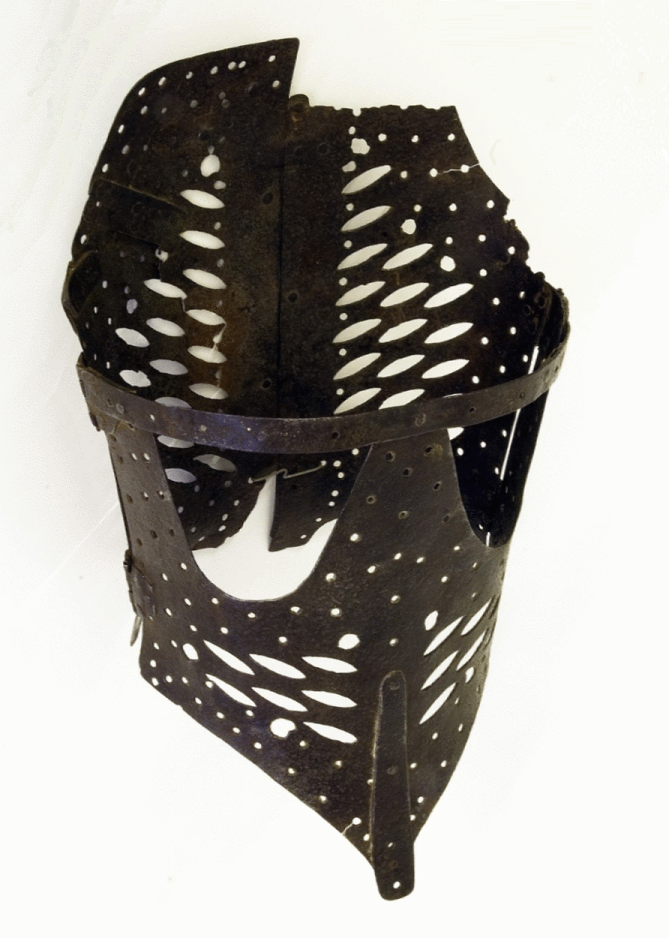
Iron corset from the late 16th century

For most of the sixteenth and seventeenth centuries corsets were known, in English, as bodies or stays. These garments could be worn as under or outer wear. The women of the French court saw this corset as "indispensable to the beauty of the female figure."

In the Elizabethan era, pairs of bodies were typically made out of layered fabrics like linen and silk, starched, and stiffened with whalebone. A busk, typically made of wood, ivory, metal, or whalebone, was added to stiffen the front of the bodice. It was carved into a thin knife shape and inserted into the bodice, then fastened and held into place by laces, so that the busk could be easily removed and replaced. By the end of the sixteenth century, bodies were commonly worn garments among the elites of Europe. The front of the corset was typically covered by a "stomacher," a stiff, V-shaped structure that was worn on the abdomen for decorative purposes. While a few surviving bodies exist that are structured with steel or iron, these are generally considered to have been either orthopedic or novelty constructions and were not worn as part of mainstream fashion, although some dress historians believe that they were not worn at all.

== 18th century ==
The most common type of corset in the 18th century was an inverted conical shape, often worn to create a contrast between a rigid quasi-cylindrical torso above the waist and heavy full skirts below. The primary purpose of 18th-century stays was to shape the torso into a fashionable 'V' or cone shape, slightly tapering the waist and creating an upright shoulders-back posture.

"Jumps" of quilted linen were also worn instead of stays for informal situations or by those who needed more freedom of movement to work. Jumps were partially boned or boned with cord instead of whalebone, and padded with cotton to provide support for the breasts while not being restrictive. Jumps were made of silk, cotton, or linen and often embroidered. Jumps fastened over the breasts with ties, buttons, or metal hooks. Both garments were considered undergarments, and would be worn outwardly only under very limited circumstances. Stays were considered more respectable than jumps, as described in an anonymous aphorism dating to 1762: "Now a shape in neat stays, now a slattern in jumps." This phrase continued to be referenced through the end of the 19th century, although the term "stays" largely fell out of fashion.

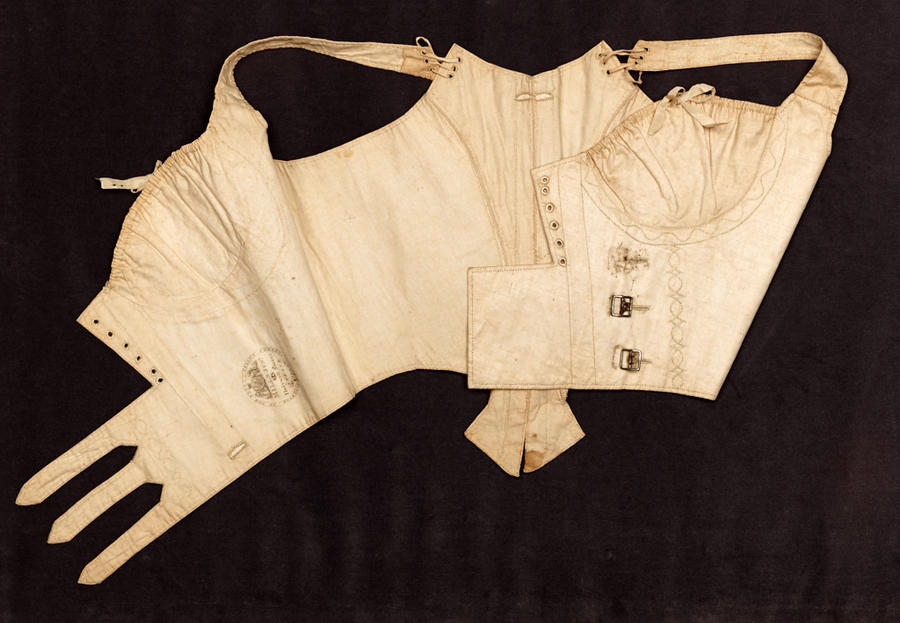
1795 short stays from Mills Jr, London

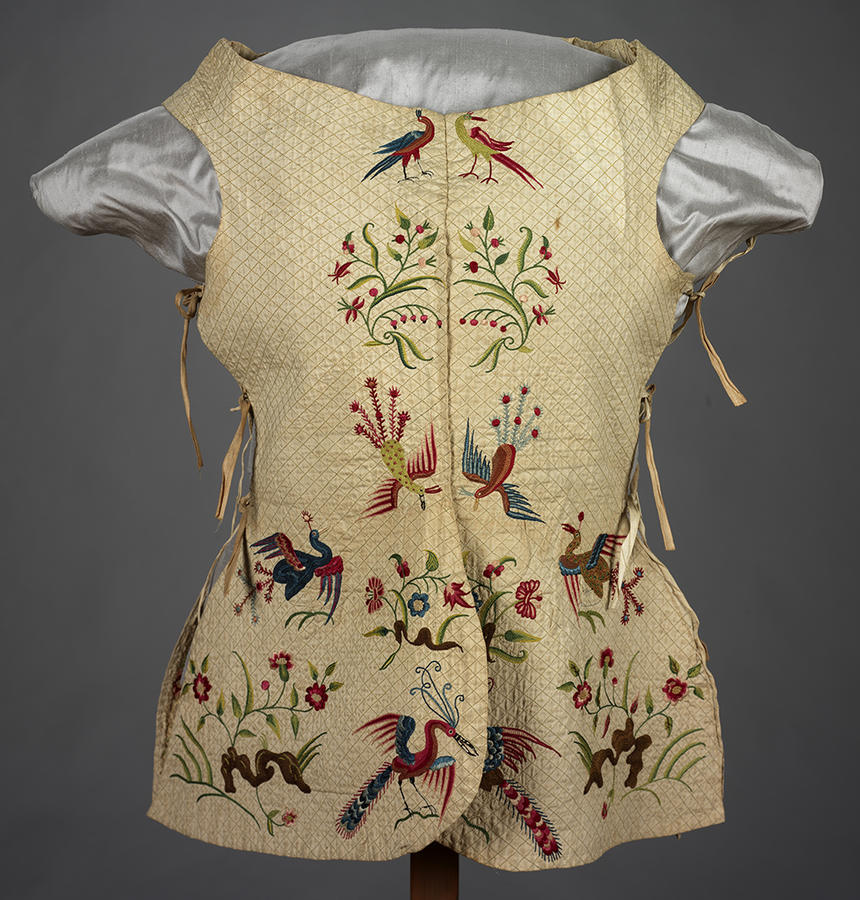
A pair of quilted linen jumps, late 17th-early 18th century

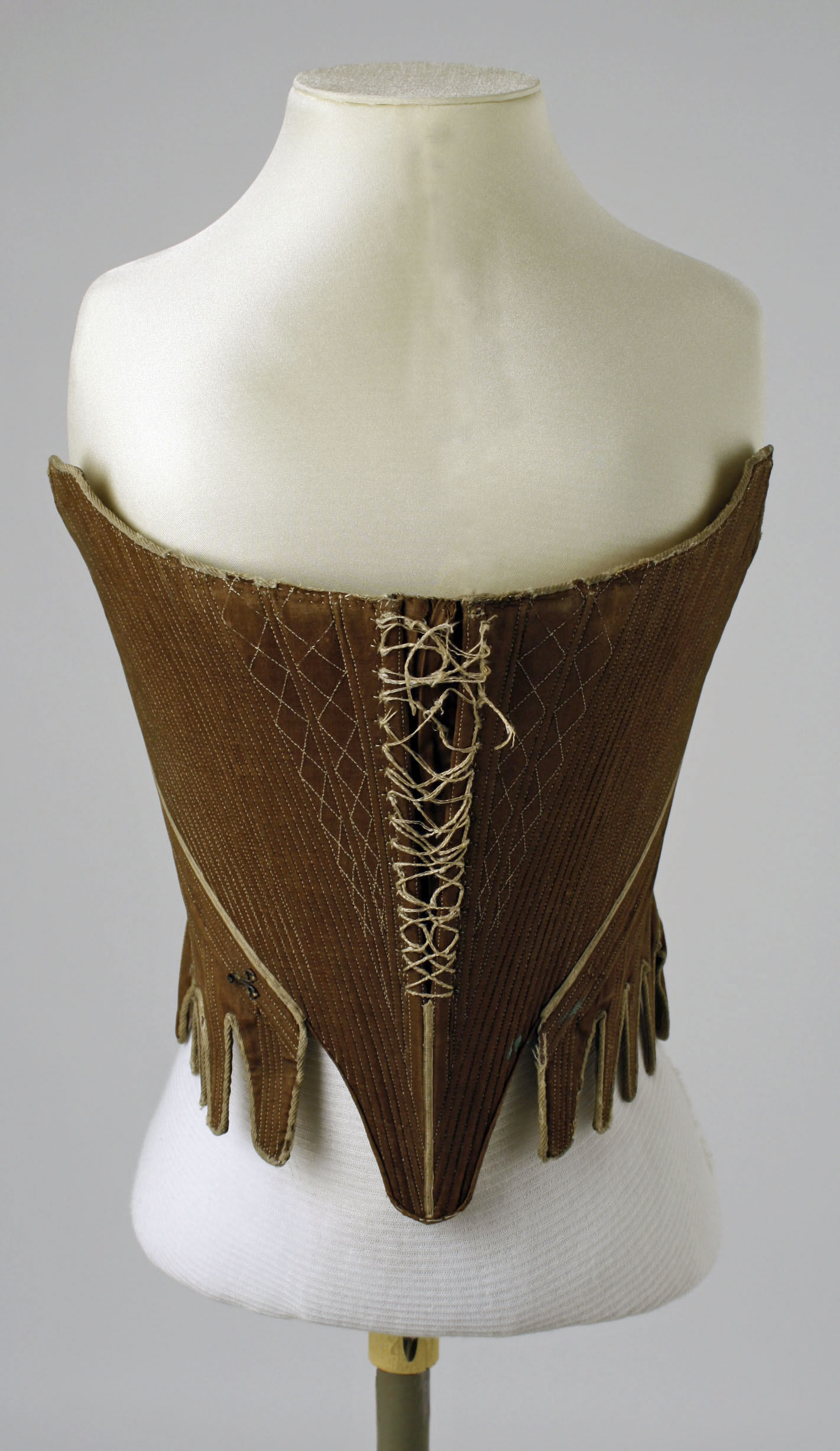
Linen stays, circa 1780

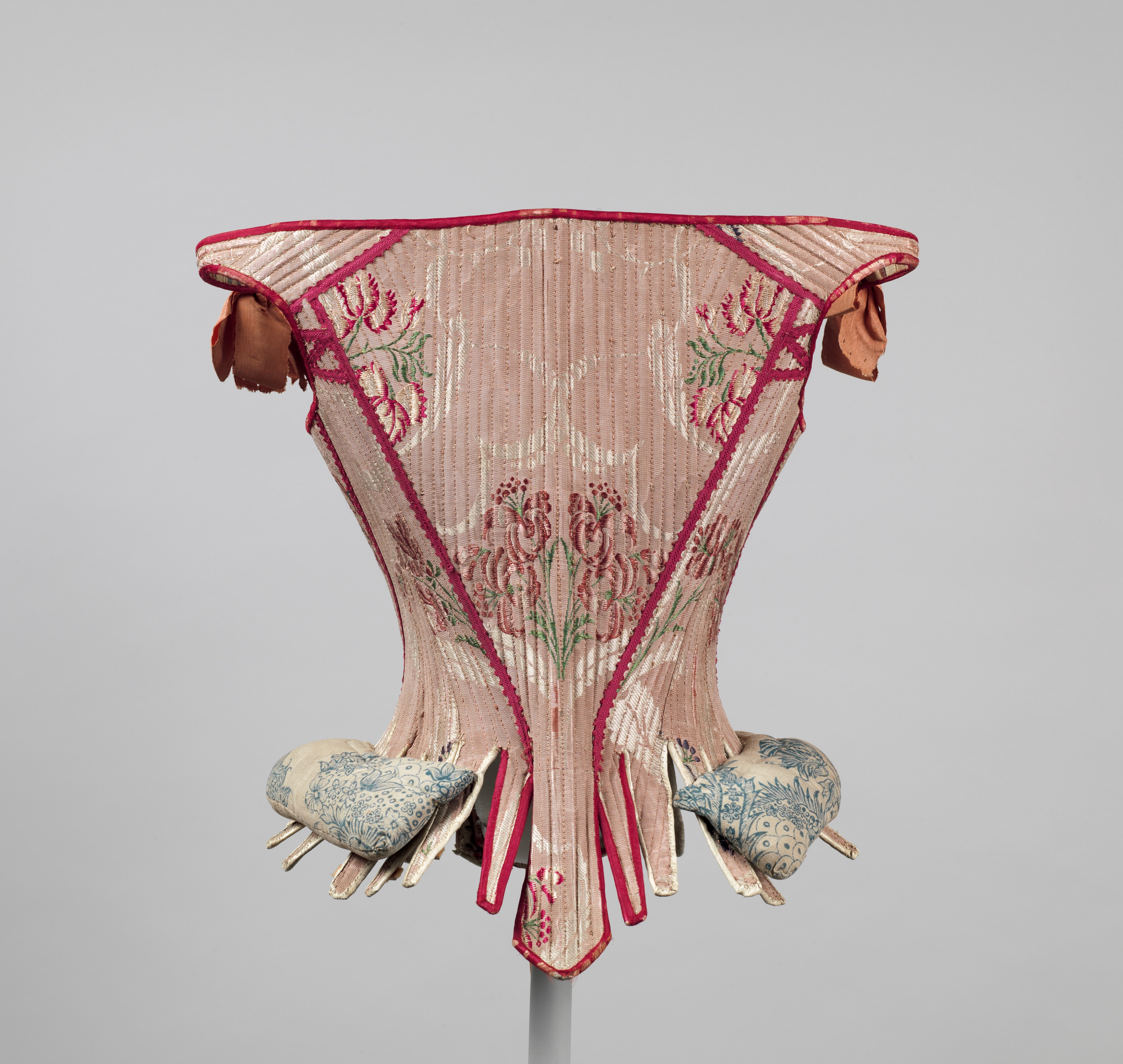
European corset from the mid-late 18th century

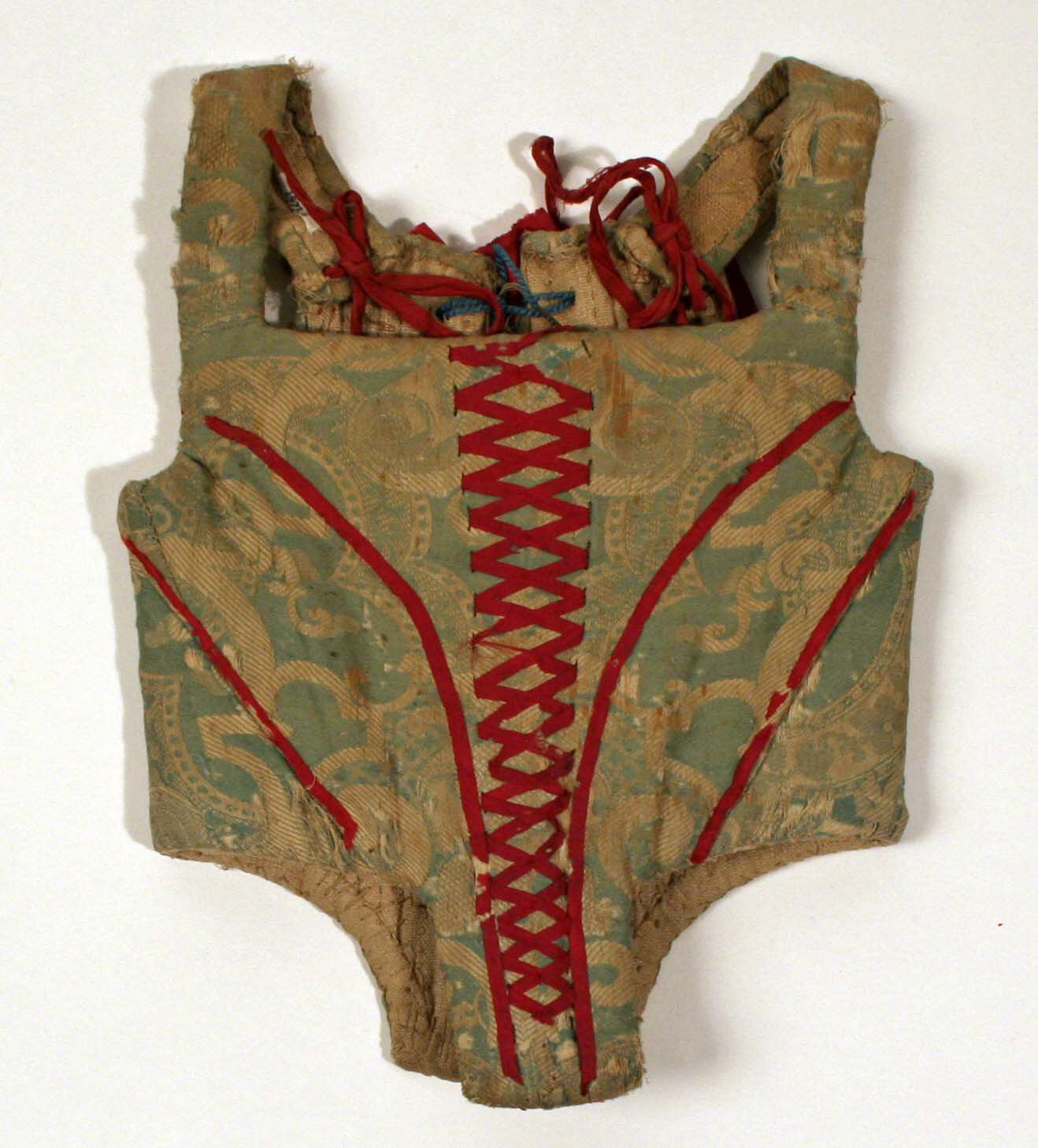
Spanish corset circa 1700

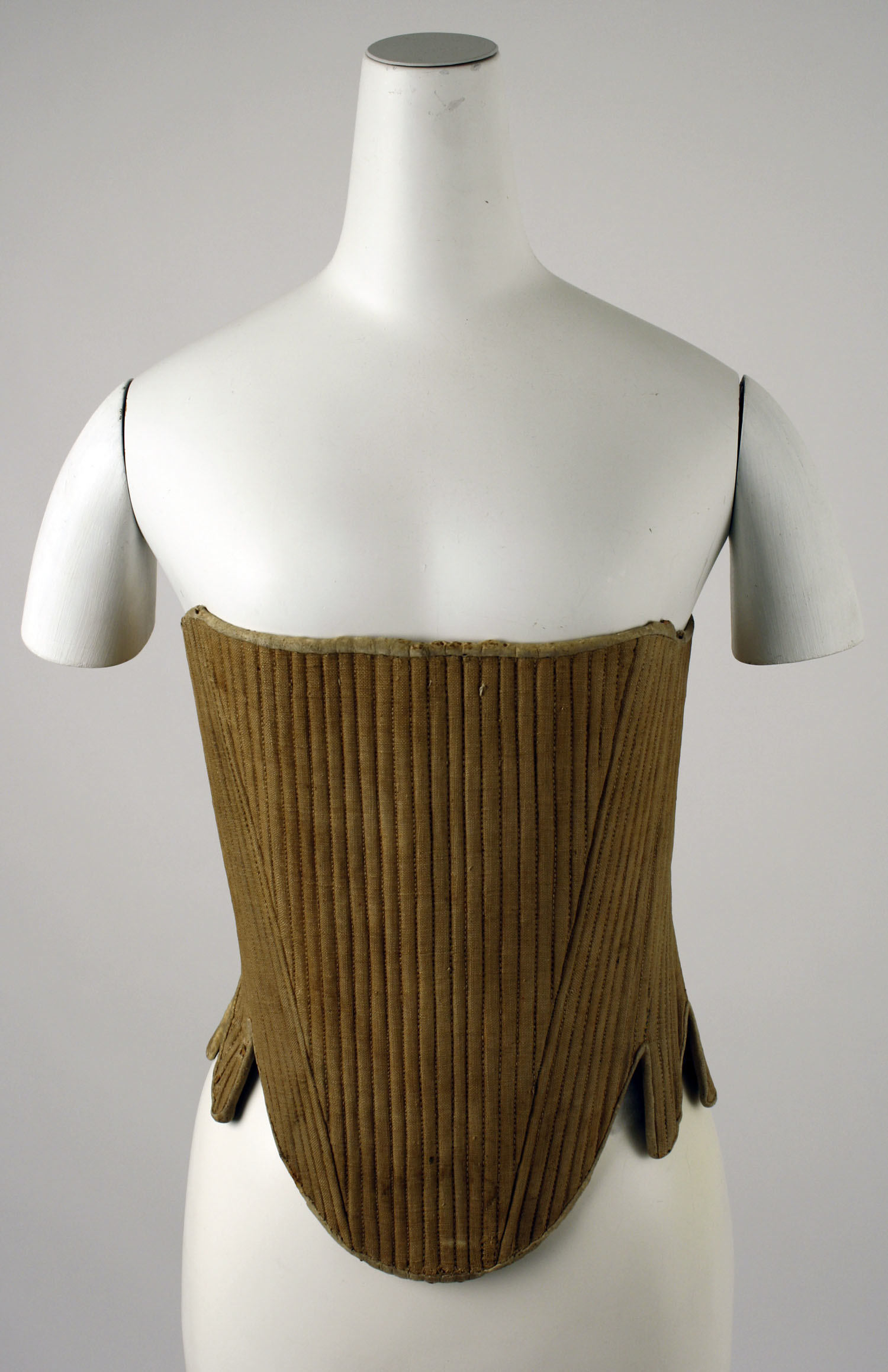
Late 18th century American stays

== Late 18th and early 19th century ==
During and shortly following the French Revolution, rationalists and classicists criticized the glorification of an artificial body shape, created by stays, as more beautiful than the natural human form. Fashion trended towards loose, thin dresses which resembled the shift dresses worn as undergarments by previous generations. Doctors and philosophers promoted the beauty of the natural female waist, and criticized the effect of wearing stays on female health as well as the health of the fetus, when worn during gestation. By the 1770s, "short stays" became the fashion. These garments did not extend beyond the chest area and had little to no boning, instead serving to create a fashionable "shelf" shape for the bust. Short stays were appropriate to wear beneath the empire silhouette gowns of the period, which were loose and unrestrictive below the chest and created a long, columnar line which referenced the clothing of Ancient Greece and Rome. This style of dress was called robe à la grecque. Lightly boned stays were still worn for formal occasions, but it was acceptable to forego them, even at highly formal settings such as at the royal court.

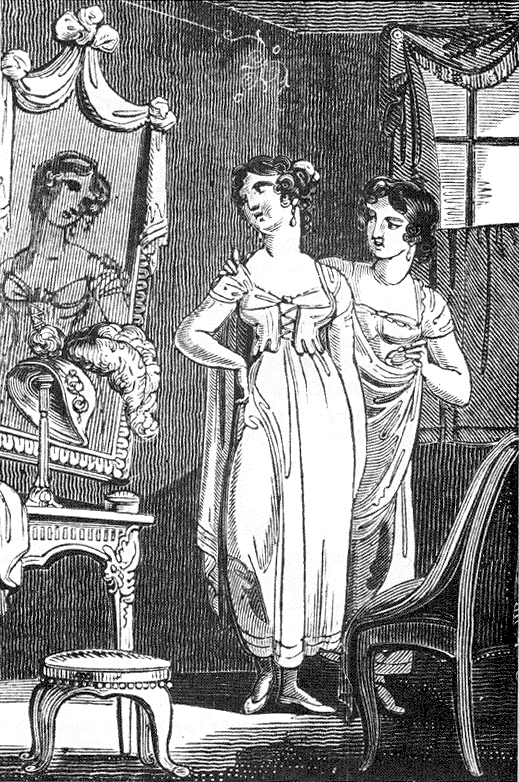
Regency short stays circa 1810

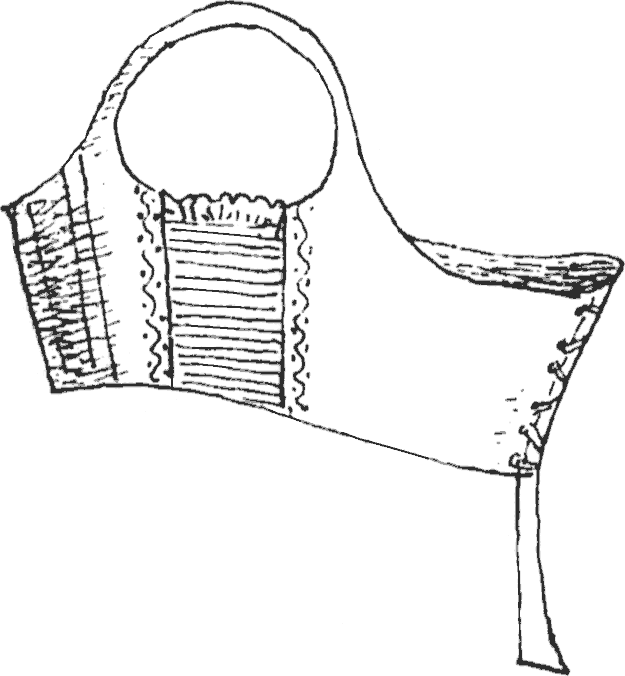
Short stays circa 1803

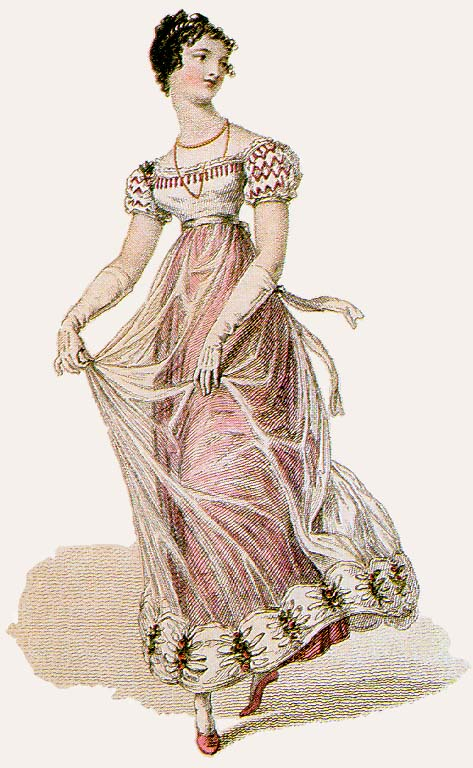
An 1823 fashion plate, showing a Regency era ball gown

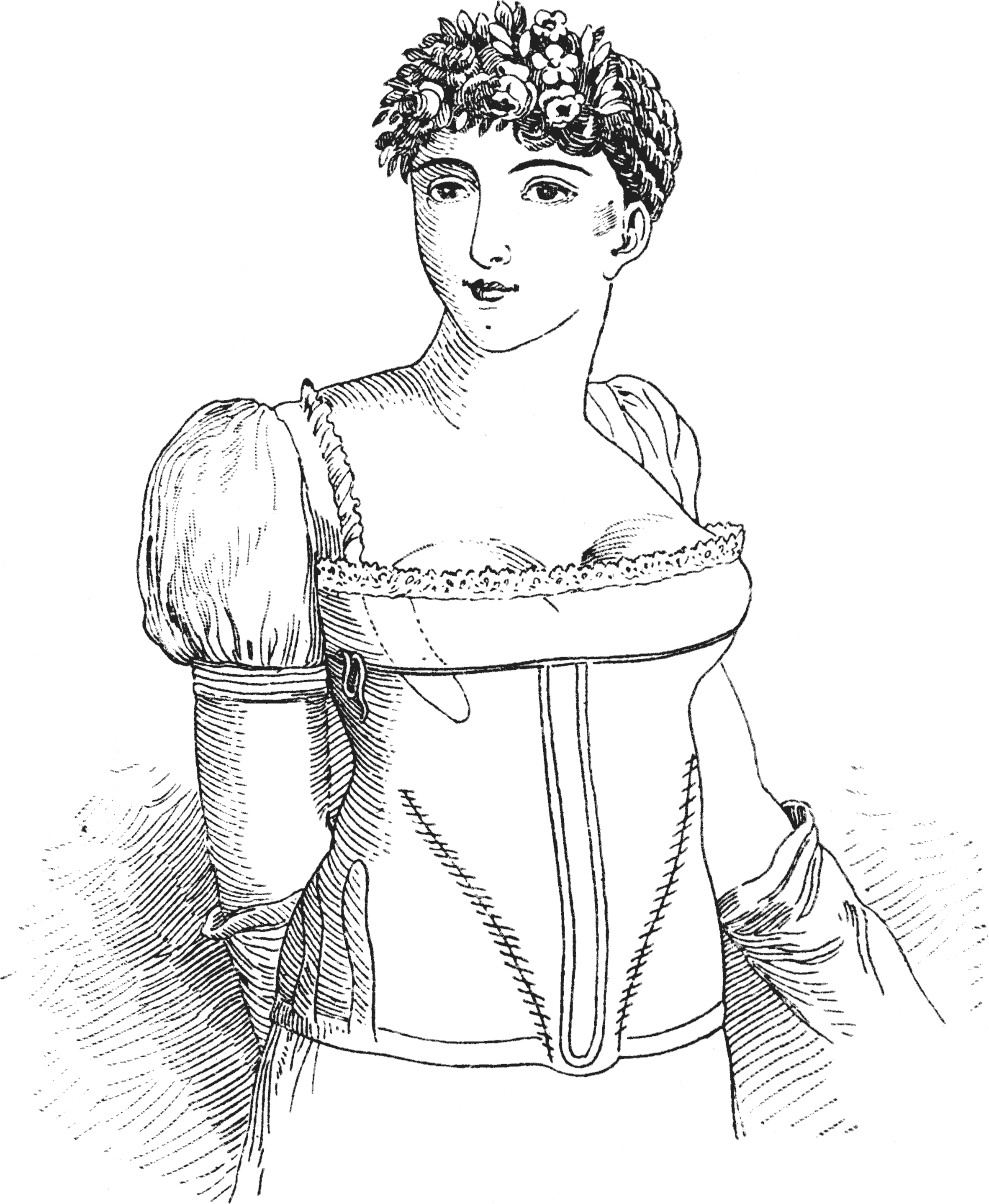
Regency-era long stays. Although these stays covered the waist, they did not create the wasp-waisted effect associated with later eras

== Late Regency and early Victorian period ==
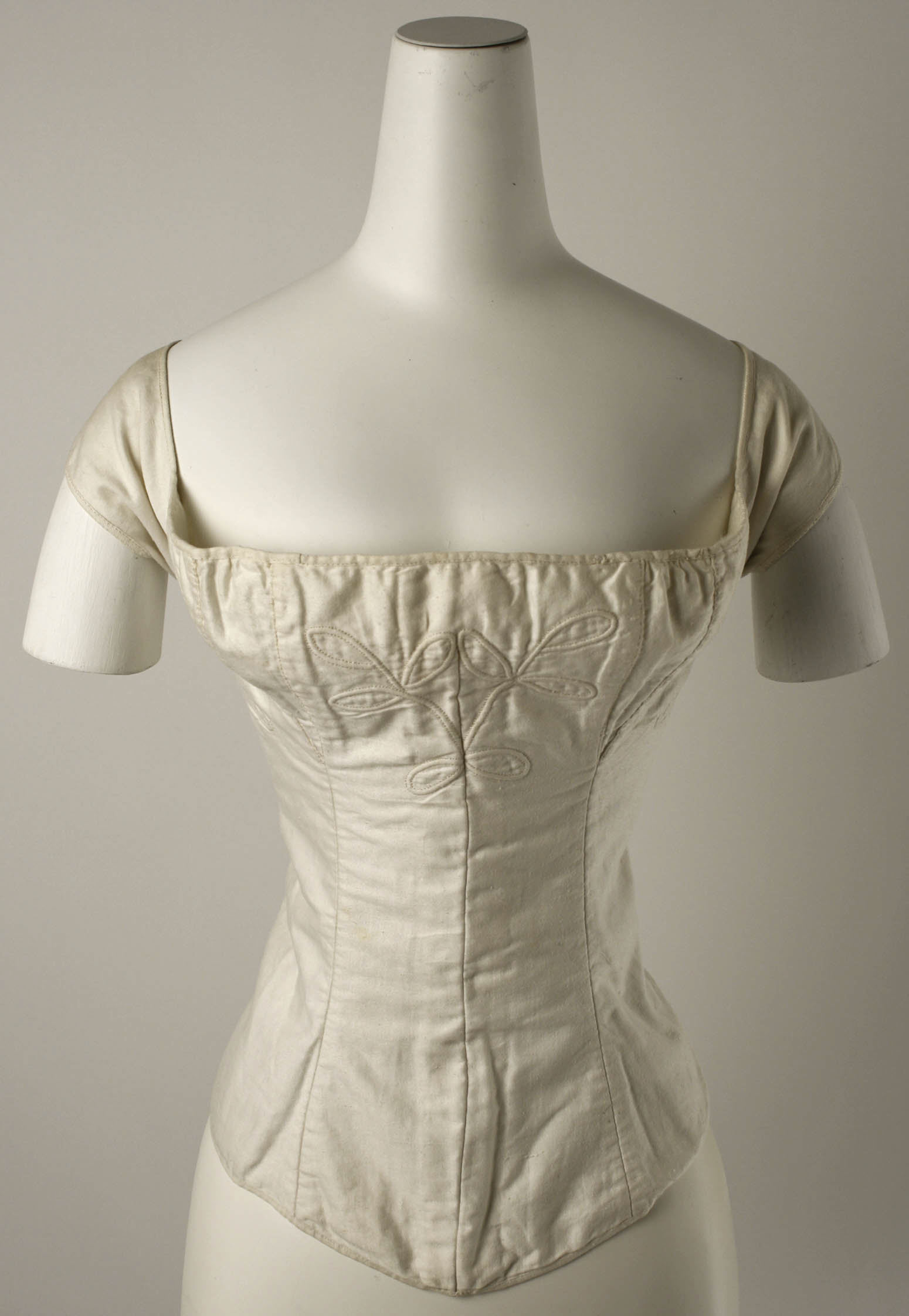
American corset, circa 1820-30

By the 1820s, the empire silhouette fell out of fashion and what we now recognize as corsets became fashionable again, along with the elaborate, structured gowns associated with the Victorian era. The industrialization of the garment industry meant that by the 1830s, steel boning had started to replace the classic whalebone. The advent of steel boning, as well as metal clasps and eyelets, meant that these corsets could be tightened significantly tighter than the stays of the 18th century without damaging the garment. The development of the front-opening split busk allowed women to more easily wear and remove their corset, making them more accessible to those without domestic help.

In addition, the manufacture of stays was turned over to the assembly line. Prior to this era, each corset was hand made by one person from start to finish, either at home or by individual craftsmen, called staymakers. By the 19th century, most corsets were made in factories, and each step was performed by a different group of people, often children. Heavy or messy work was done in house, such as cutting the fabric pieces and lacquering the steels to prevent rust, and lighter work, such as sewing the bones in place, was taken home by piece workers, generally women who enlisted their children to help them. The advent of the sewing machine as well as steam-moulding technology allowed manufacturers to offer a variety of corsets in more rounded, structured shapes.

The diarist Emily Eden recorded that she had to obtain a silver "husk" before accompanying her brother to India because a humid climate rusted the usual steel and spoilt the garment. In 1839, a Frenchman by the name of Jean Werly made a patent for women's corsets made on the loom. As seen in various fashion advertisements of the era, the common corset cost one dollar ($1) ($34.85 in 2026)

== Mid- to Late-Victorian era ==
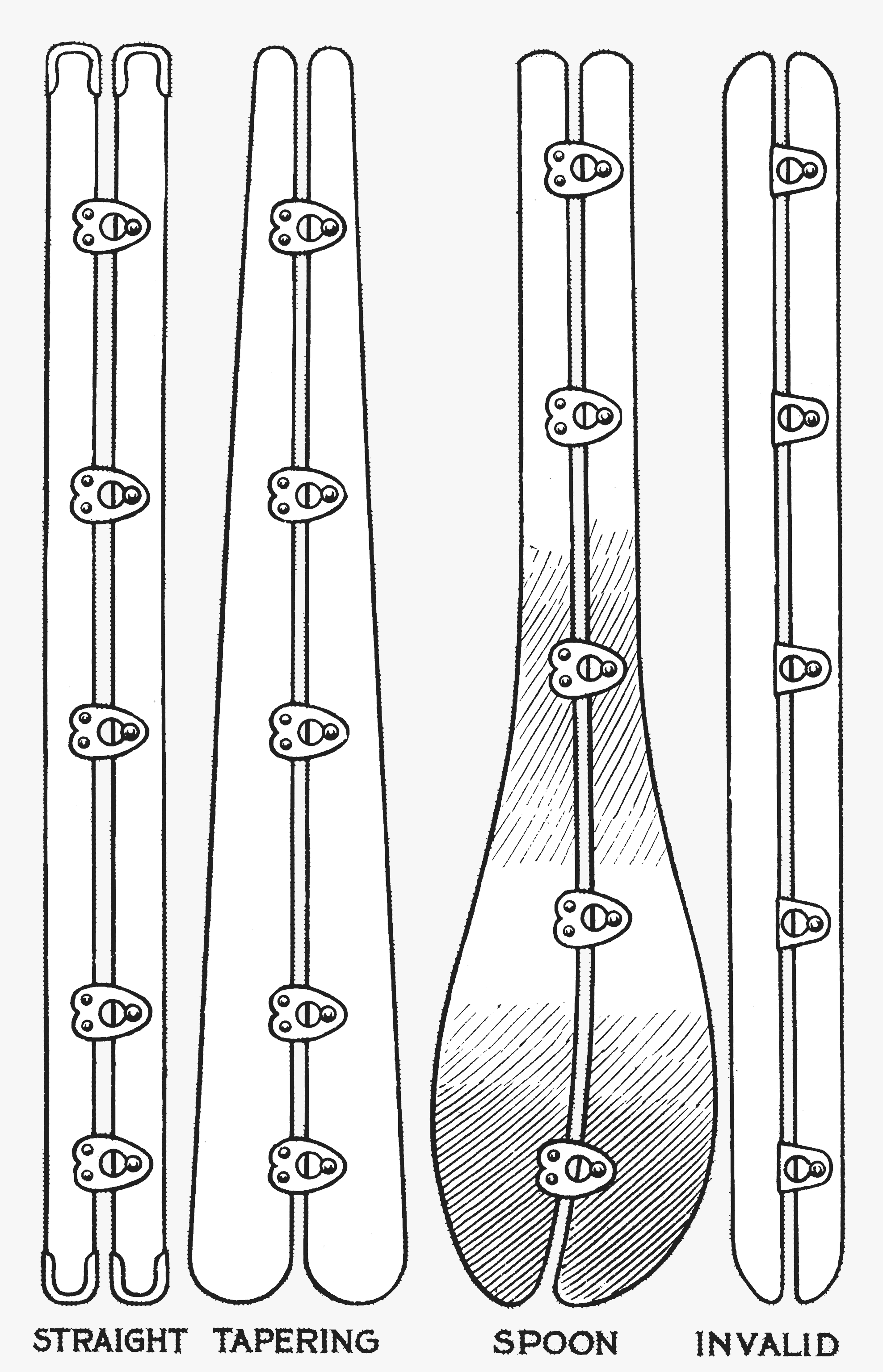
Diagram of different busk shapes.

Styles of corset during the mid- to late-Victorian era changed drastically depending on the fashions of the time. Corsets during this era tended to be strapless with fastenings in the front and back. Corsets were often decorated with elements like boning in contrasting colors and lace trims. Developments in technology such as the invention of the cage crinoline in 1856 allowed women to achieve larger and larger skirt volumes without the weight of burdensome petticoats, leading to less dramatically-shaped corsets with wider hips. Later, as smaller, less voluminous skirts came into fashion in the 1870s, corsets trended towards smaller waists again. The spoon busk was developed in the 1870s, and served to shape the stomach and distribute pressure.

=== Corset controversy ===
The dress reform movement of the 1850s and 1860s opposed corsets and advocated against their use, particularly the high-fashion trend of tightlacing to achieve ever-smaller waistlines. While support for fashionable dress contested that corsets maintained an upright, ‘good figure’, as a necessary physical structure for moral and well-ordered society, dress reformists contested that women’s fashions were not only physically detrimental but “the results of male conspiracy to make women subservient by cultivating them in slave psychology.” They believed a change in fashions could change the position of women, allowing for more social mobility, independence from men and marriage, the ability to work for wages, and better physical movement and comfort.

The corset controversy was also closely tied to notions of social Darwinism and eugenics. The anxiety surrounding the damaged uterus, ovaries, and fetus were frequently pointed to as a danger to the "race" (i.e., European race). Western women were thought to be weaker and more prone to birth complications than the ostensibly more vigorous, healthier, "primitive" races who did not wear corsets. Dress reformers exhorted readers to reform the corset, or risk destroying the "civilized" races. On the other hand, those who argued for the importance of corsets cited Darwinism as well, specifically the notion that women were less evolved and thus frailer, in need of the support of a corset.

In 1873 Elizabeth Stuart Phelps Ward wrote:

So burn up the corsets! No, nor do you save the whalebones. You will never need whalebones again. Make a bonfire of the cruel steels that has lorded it over the contents of the abdomen and thorax for so many thoughtless years, and heave a sigh of relief: for your 'emancipation,' I assure you, has from this moment begun.

Along with dress reformists, doctors criticized the trends in corsets. Reformists claimed that lifelong corset-wearing had a variety of health risks. Obstetricians of this period connected lifelong corset-wearing to the difficult births that many Victorian women experienced. In particular, the use of corsets during pregnancy was widely condemned, with physician Alice Bunker Stockham writing sardonically: "The corset should not be worn for two hundred years before pregnancy takes place."

Despite these protests, the corset did not fall out of fashion for many decades. However, corset manufacturers responded to the public health outcry by offering a variety of corsets which promoted "hygiene" (referring to the general health of the body, not cleanliness), introducing features such as elastic, buttons instead of metal clasps, or more lightweight fabrics, which became highly popular. Roxey Ann Caplin was a noted corset designer who consulted her husband, a physician and anatomist, to create more anatomically forgiving corsets for a variety of situations, including maternity.

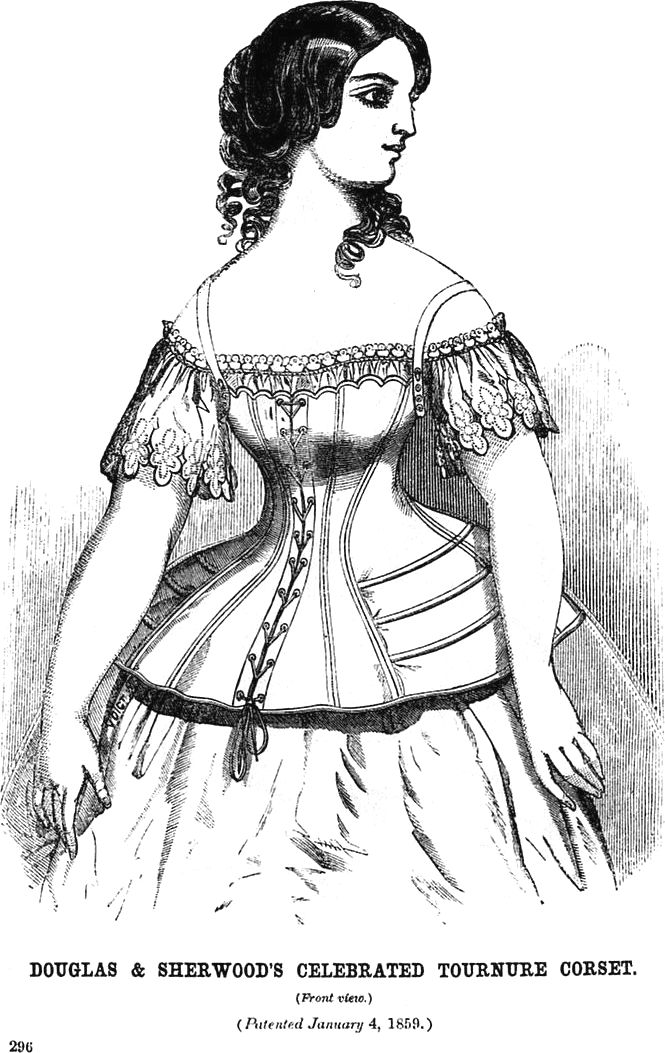
1859 corset with built-in partial crinoline

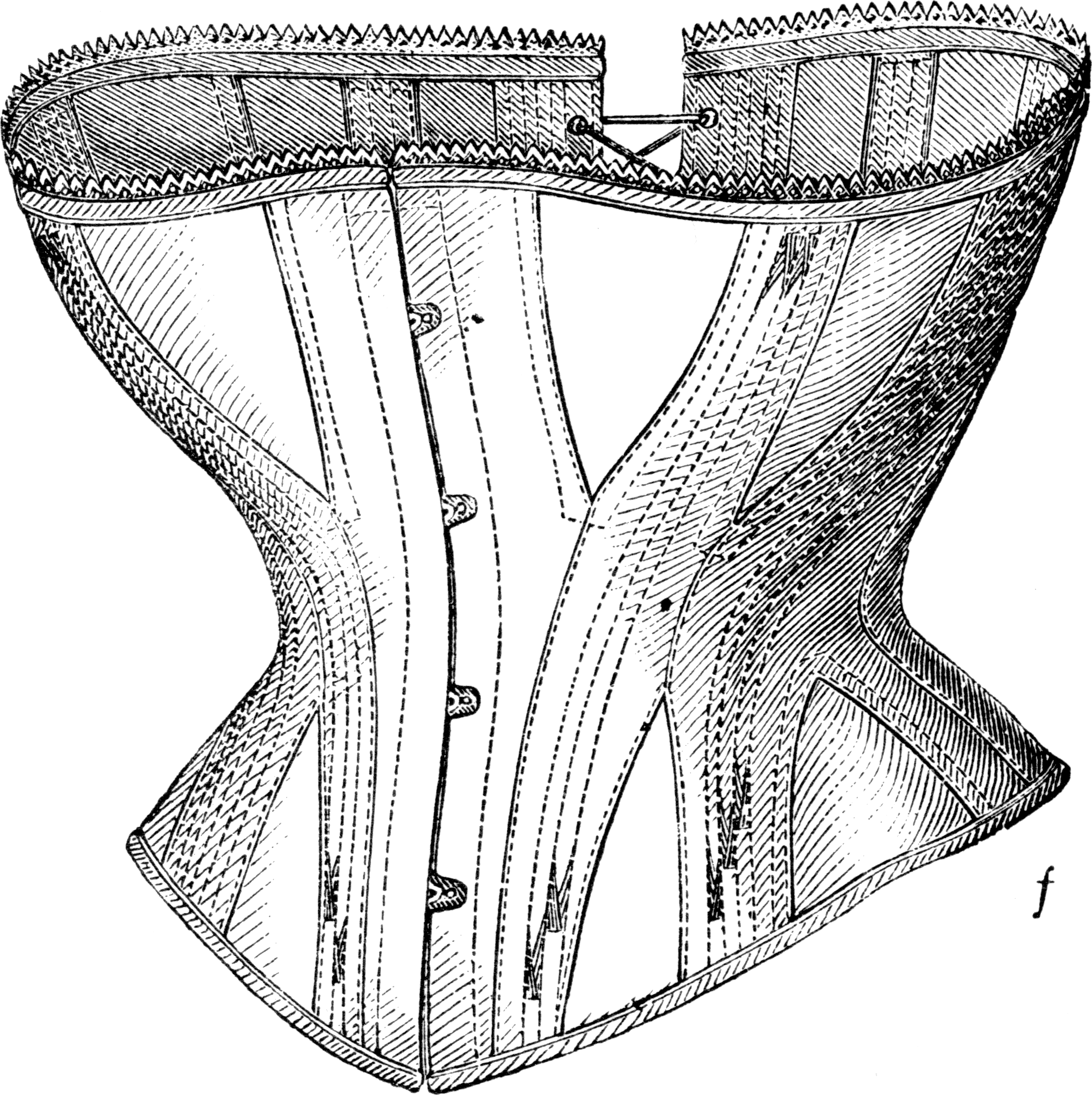
1869 corset

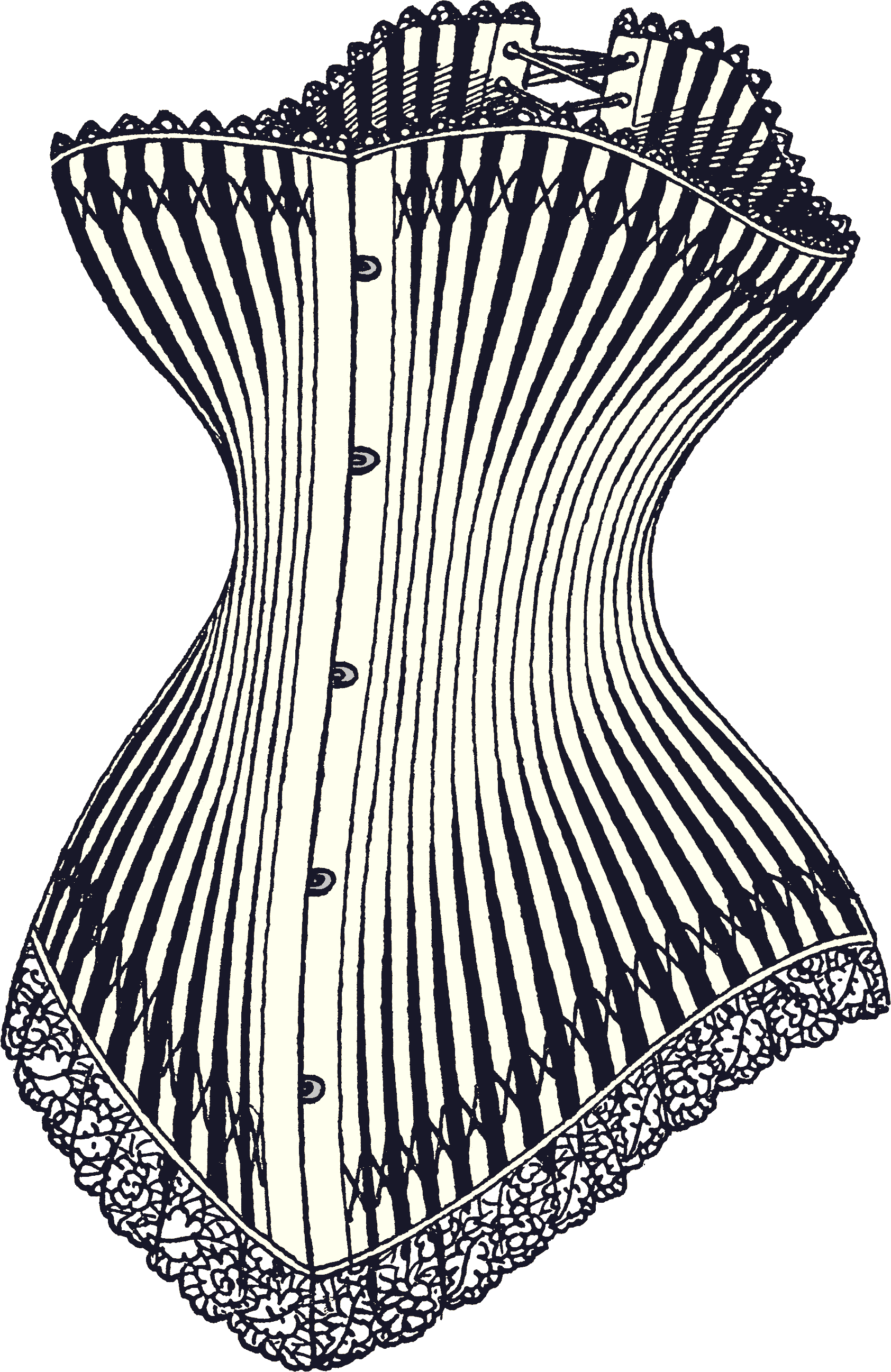
1878 corset

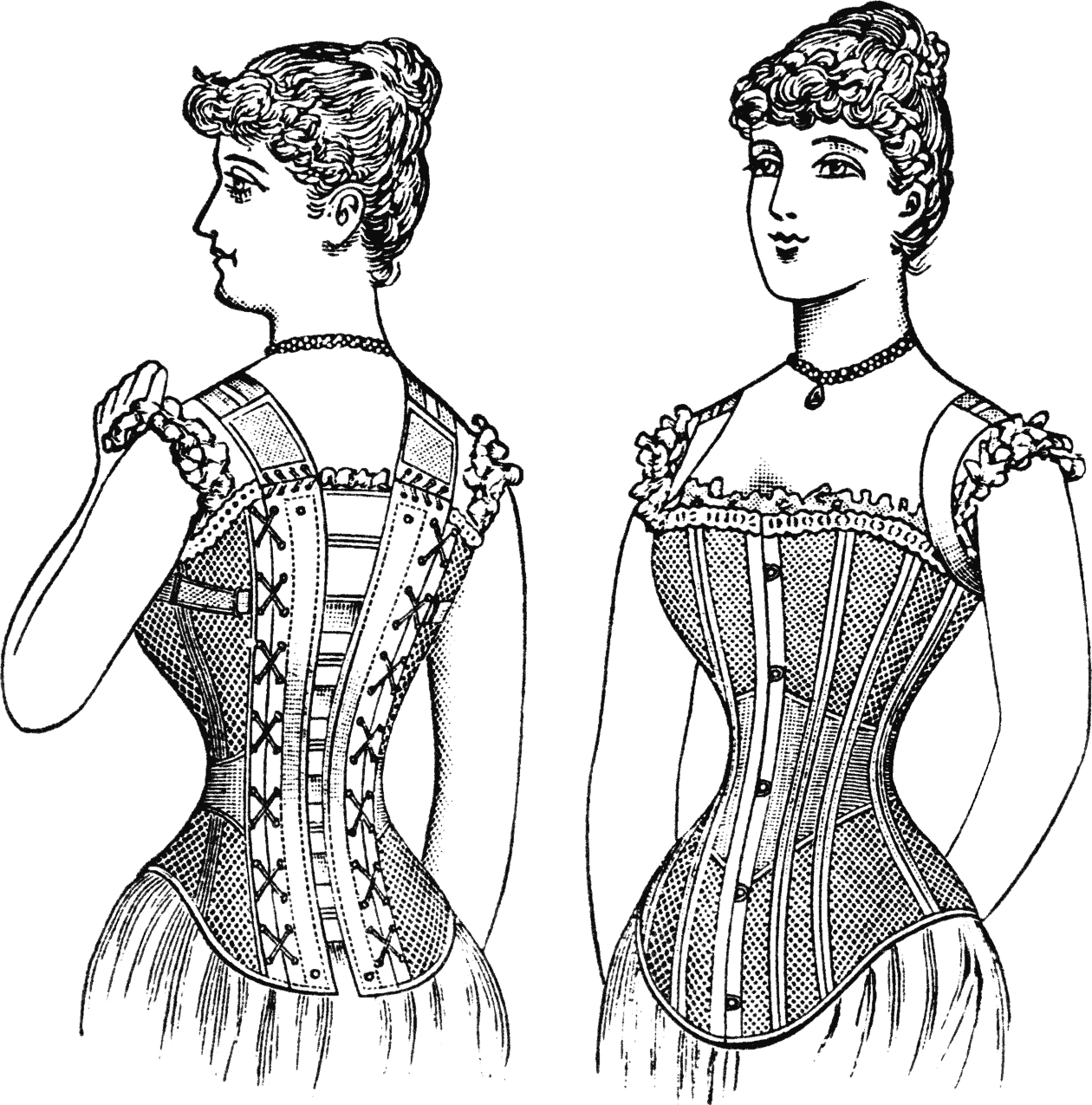
1890 corset

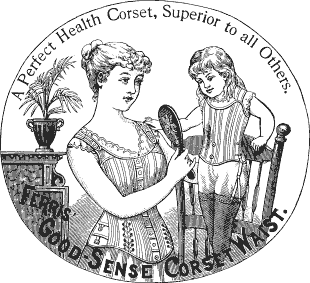
"Perfect Health" Corset
c 1890.

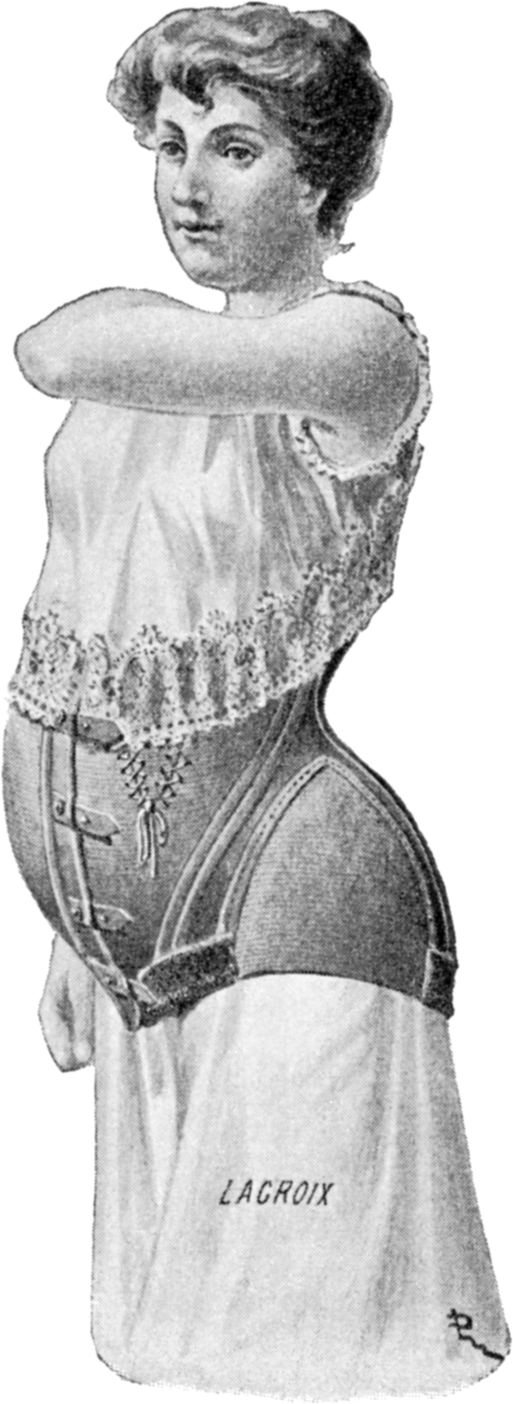
A pregnancy corset, 1900-1908

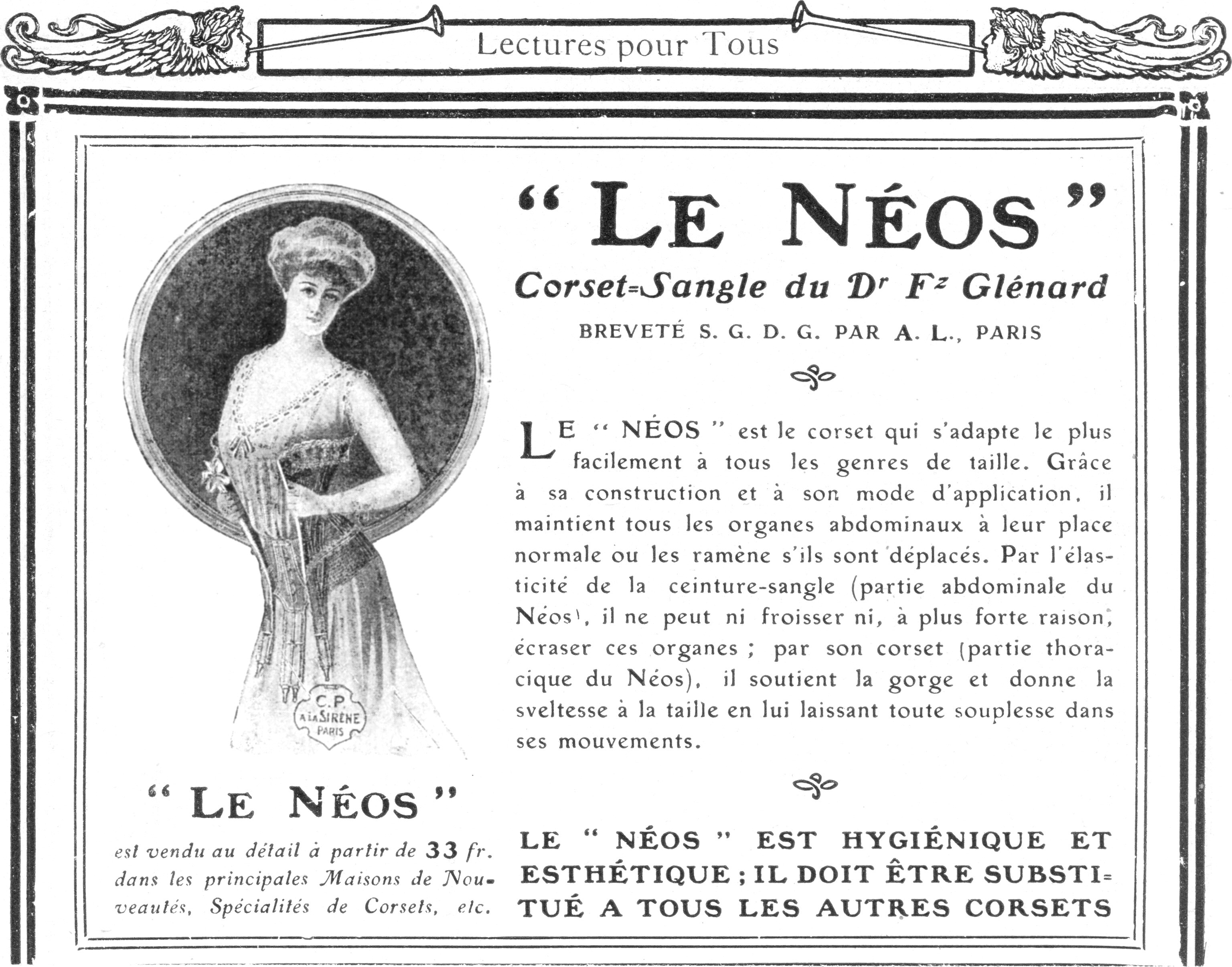
An advertisement, in French, for a hygienic corset, claiming to maintain the wearer's organs in their normal position, 1906

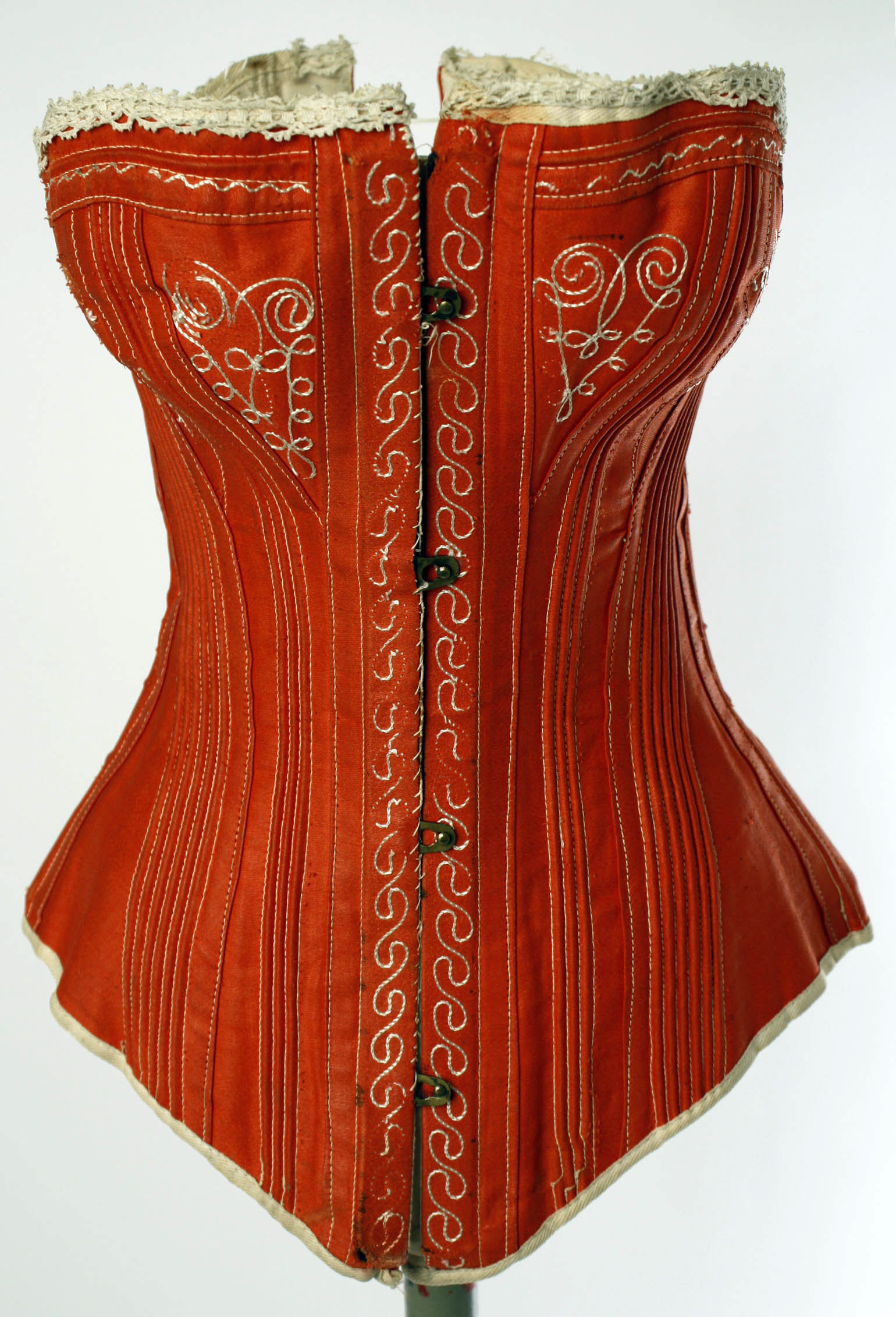
Highly decorative English corset from the 1880s with contrasting embroidery and lace trim

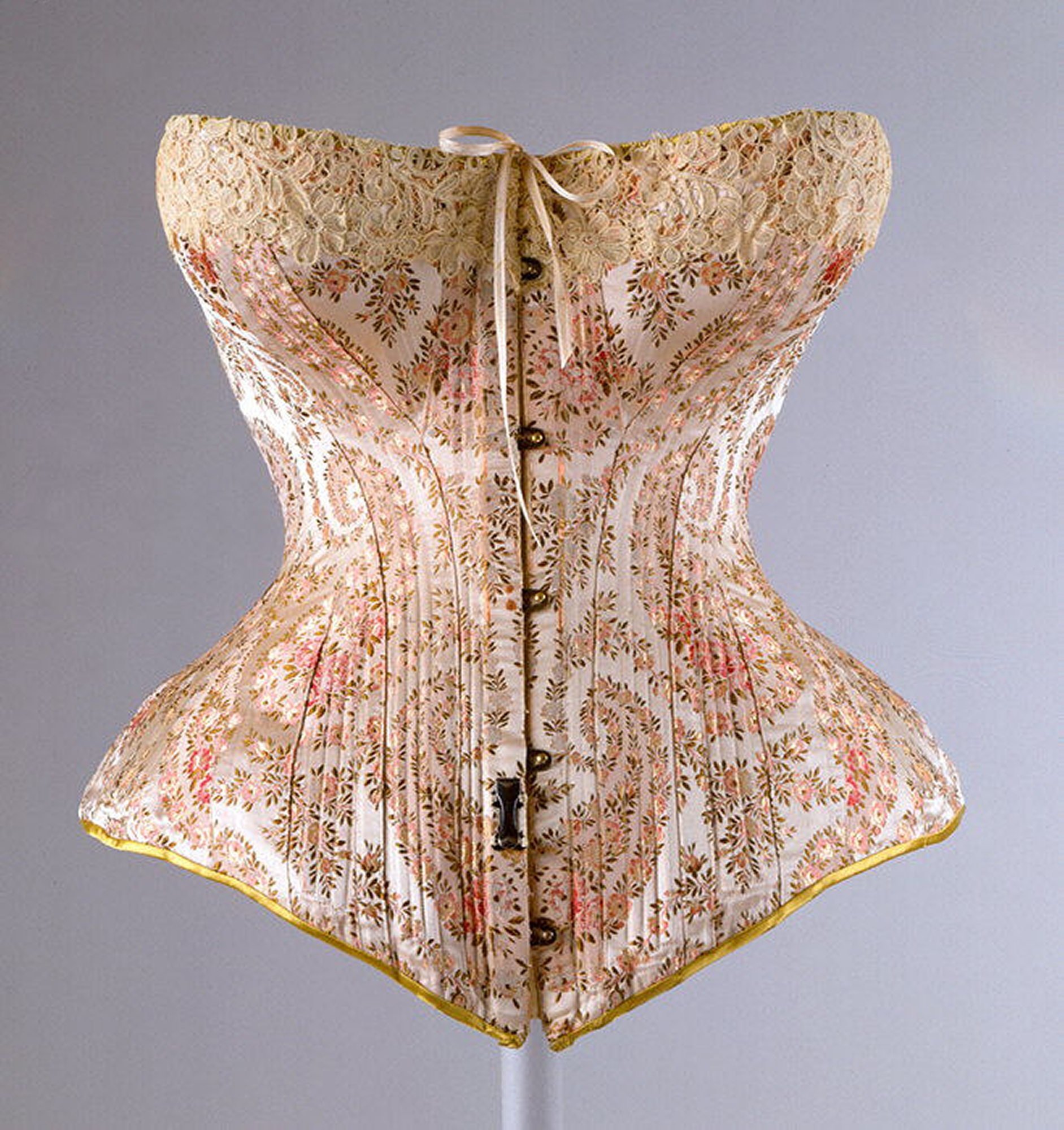
French silk corset, 1891

== Edwardian and Post-Edwardian era ==
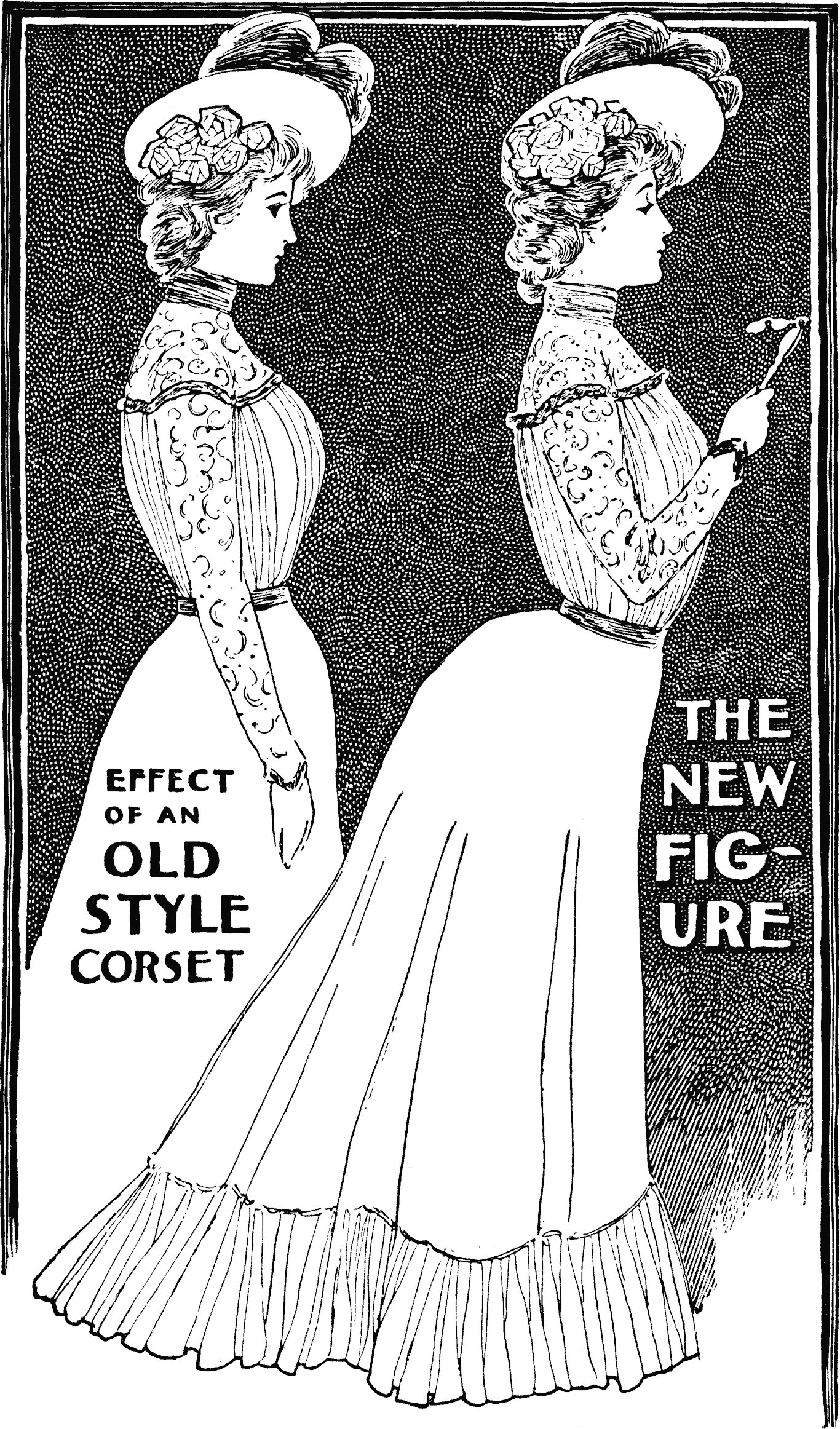
1900 illustration contrasting the old Victorian corseted silhouette with the new Edwardian "S-bend" corseted silhouette

As discussed in the previous sections, health concerns around the usage of corsets led to the development of "hygienic" corsets which purported to be less harmful to the wearer's health. A number of doctors themselves became corsetieres, either fitting their patients into corsets or even going into the corset-making trade themselves. Inès Gâches-Sarraute, a female doctor who was interested in the corset, is credited with creating the straight-fronted busk corset to address gynecological problems her patients suffered. This design, seen on the left, purported to reduce pressure on the wearer's abdomen. The new silhouette became the mode by the late 1890s.

Along with a change to the pattern and structure of the corset, the S-bend silhouette also necessitated a change in posture, requiring the wearer to adopt a lordotic or swayback stance to conform to the shape of the corset and avoid crumpling the flexible bones inside. The straight-front corset could be paired with bum, hip, and bust pads to create a fashionably exaggerated silhouette.

From 1908 to 1914, the fashionable narrow-hipped and narrow-skirted silhouette necessitated the lengthening of the corset at its lower edge. Meanwhile, as bras began to catch on in the 1910s, fewer and fewer corsets included bust support. A new type of corset covered the thighs and changed the position of the hip, making the waist appear higher and wider and the hips narrower, forecasting the "flapper" silhouette of the 1920s. The new fashion was considered uncomfortable, cumbersome, and required the use of strips of elastic fabric. The development of rubberized elastic materials in 1911 helped the girdle replace the corset. However, these garments were better known as girdles, and had the express purpose of reducing the hips in size.

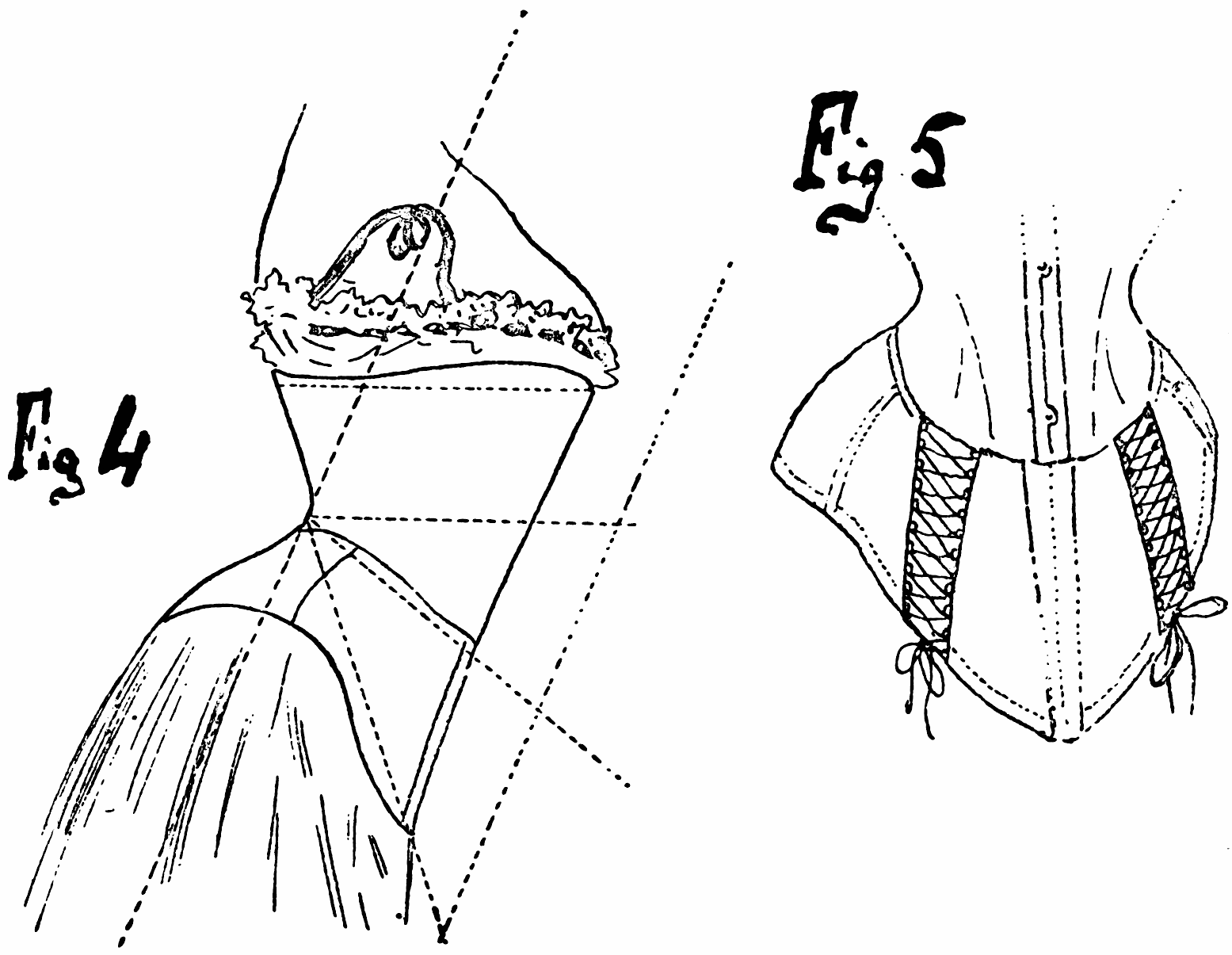
A diagram of a straight-front corset, 1902

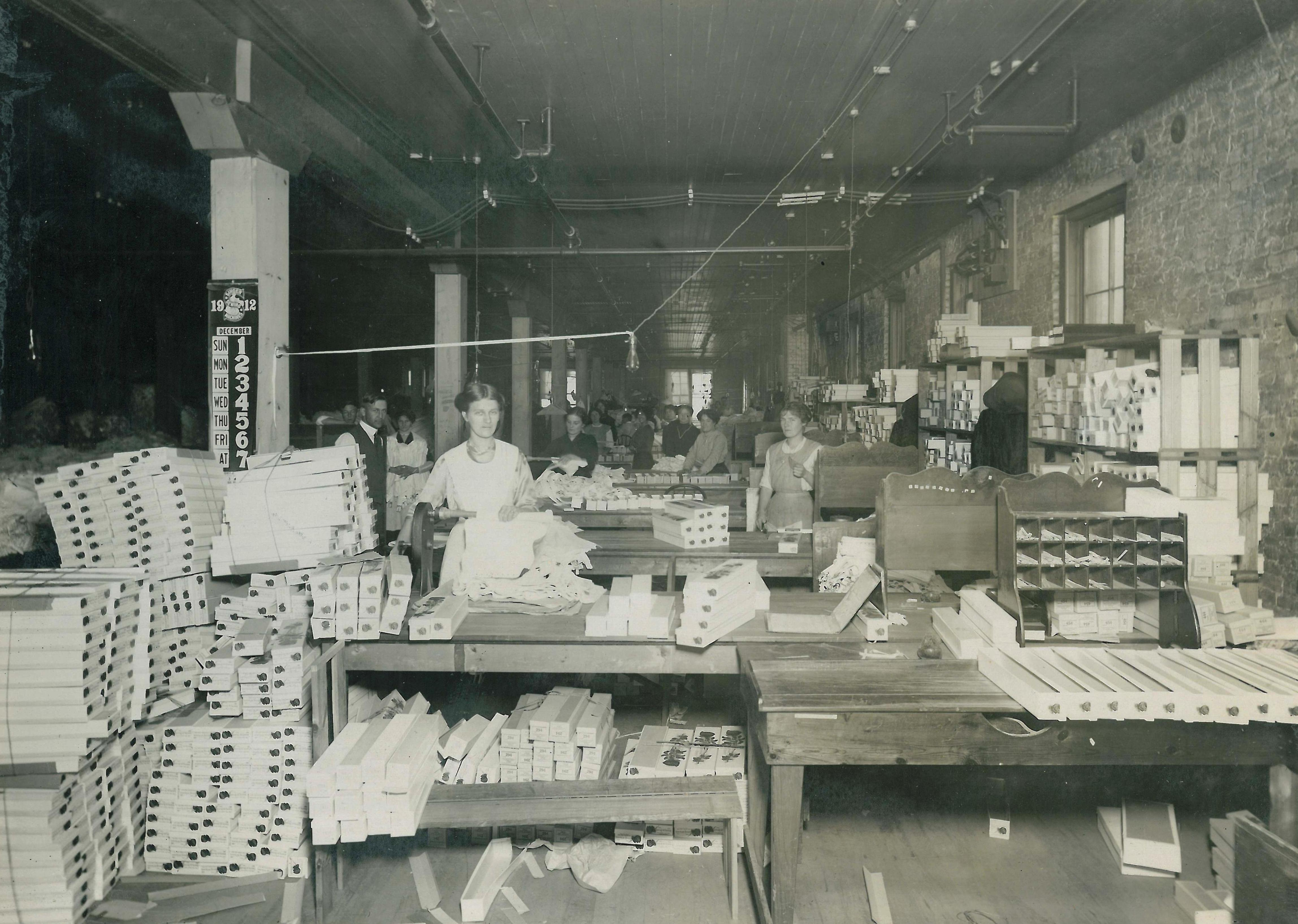
Corset production, 1912.

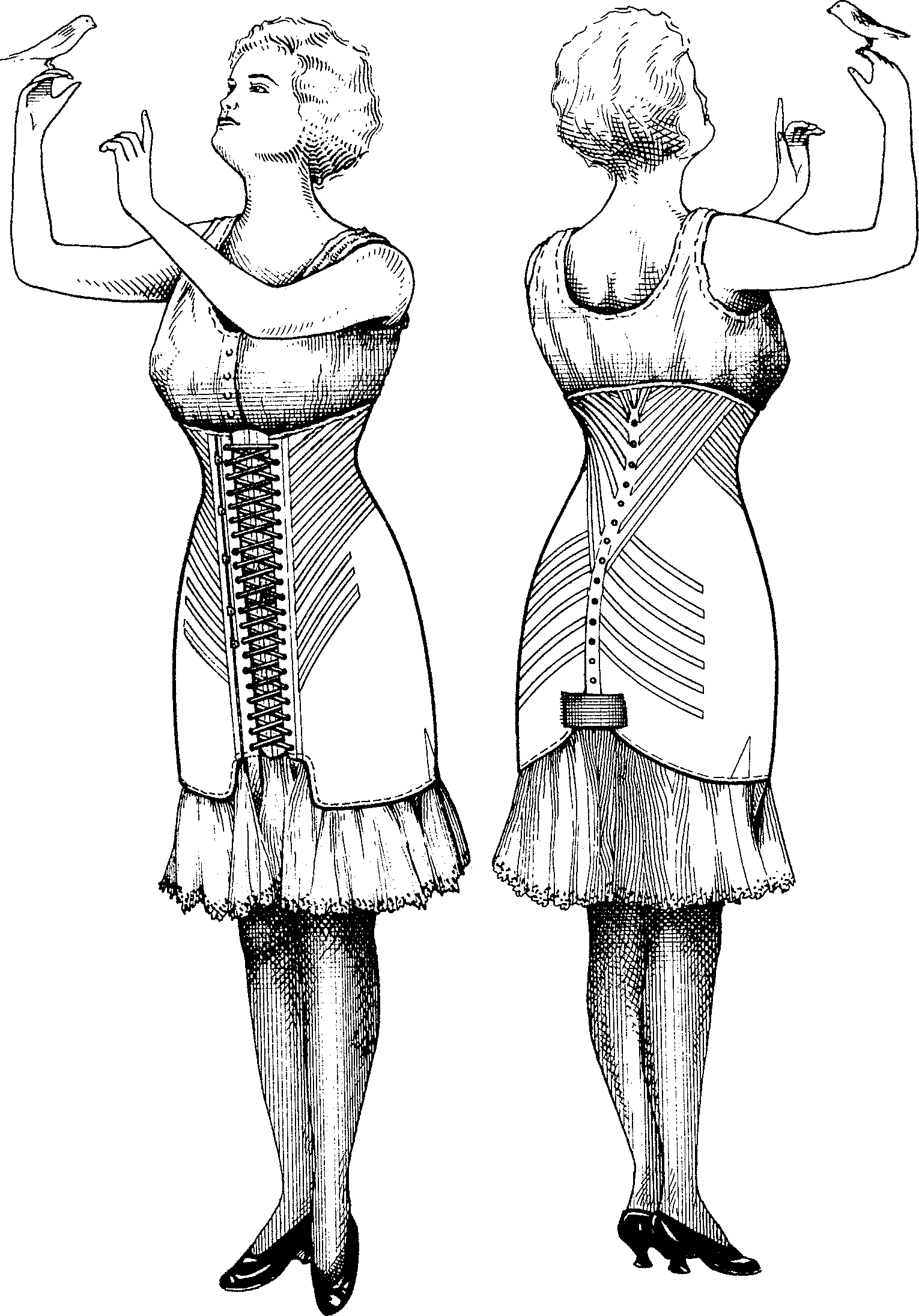
A longline corset which primarily slims the hips and thighs, 1917

== Post-World War I ==
A return to waist nipping corsets in 1939 caused a stir in fashion circles but World War II ended their return as women entered the workforce en masse and material shortages again became widespread, necessitating sleeker, more utilitarian designs.

== Post-World War II ==
In 1952, a corset known as 'The Merry Widow' was released by Warner's. Initially, the Merry Widow was a trademark of the famous Maidenform company, which designed it for Lana Turner's role in a 1952 movie of the same name. The Merry Widow differed from earlier corsets in that it separated the breasts, whereas corsets had held them together.

Both corsets and girdles remained popular throughout the 1950s and 1960s, especially with the creation of Christian Dior's "New Look" in 1947. The "New Look" silhouette featured full skirts and nipped-in waists which appealed to the nostalgia of post-World War II America. The style contrasted sharply from the more utilitarian styles that had been needed during wartime, when women entered the workforce en masse and fashion houses faced widespread fabric shortages. The glamorous Dior designs symbolized a return to femininity under post-war American prosperity.

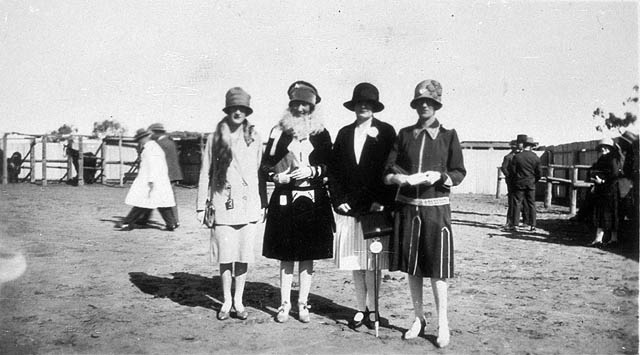
Four women demonstrating the short skirted, straight-line silhouettes of the late 1920s.

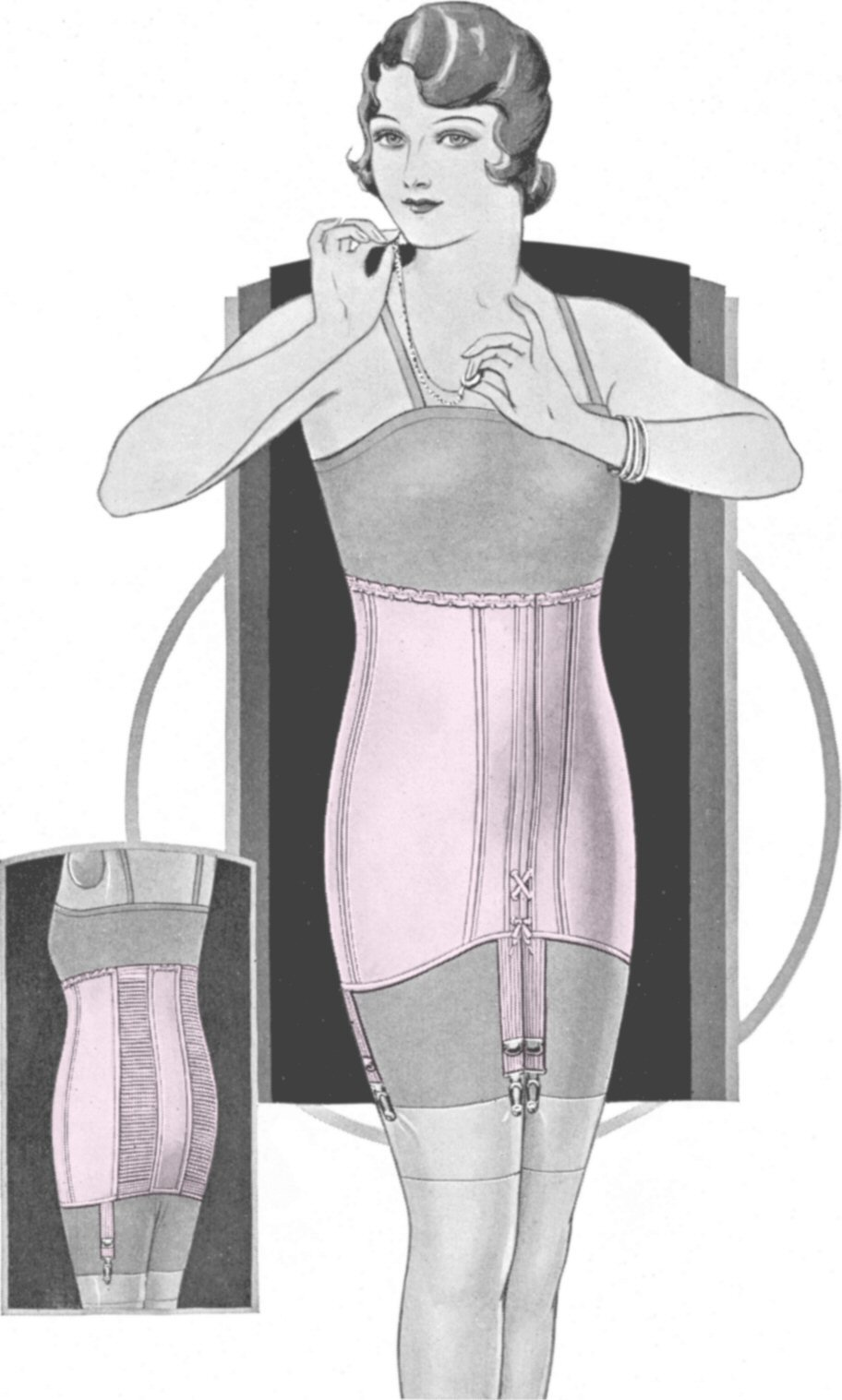
Diagram of a girdle, 1930s

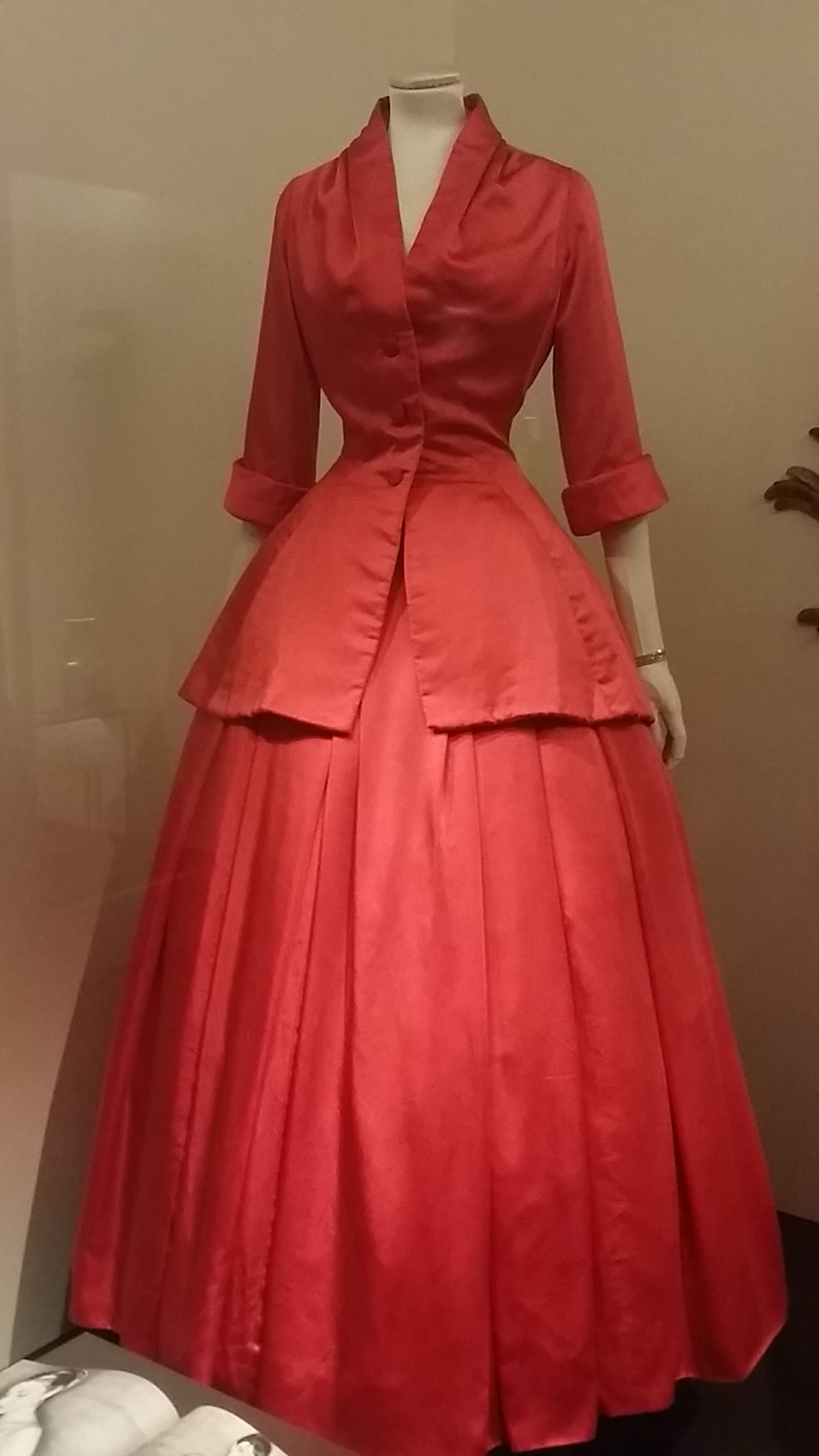
A 1954 evening gown from Dior, exemplifying the New Look

== Late 20th century and onwards ==
By the 1960s, the advent of hippie culture and youth rebellion led the wasp-waisted silhouette to fall out of favor. Feminist activists protested against the restrictive nature of Dior's designs. In 1968 at the feminist Miss America protest, protestors symbolically threw a number of feminine products into a "Freedom Trash Can." These included girdles and corsets, which were among items the protestors called "instruments of female torture".The 1960s and 1970s saw the rise of popular fitness culture. Dieting, plastic surgery (modern liposuction was invented in the mid-1970s), and exercise became the preferred methods of achieving a thin waist. The sexual revolution of the 1960s and 70s brought with it midriff-revealing styles like the crop top, and many women chose to forgo supportive undergarments like girdles or corsets, preferring a more athletic figure.

The corset has largely fallen out of mainstream fashion since the 1920s in Europe and North America, replaced by girdles and elastic brassieres, but has survived as an article of costume. Originally an item of lingerie, the corset has become a popular item of outerwear in the fetish, BDSM, and Goth subcultures. In the fetish and BDSM literature, there is often much emphasis on tightlacing, and many corset makers cater to the fetish market. Women associated with the goth and punk subcultures experimented with corsets as outerwear, reclaiming the sexual symbolism and fetishistic, sadomasochistic associations of the garment. In the 1970s, high-fashion punk designer Vivienne Westwood began to incorporate corsets with printed designs. In the 1980s, other haute couture designers such as Jean Paul Gaultier and Thierry Mugler began to experiment with corsets.

In the early 2020s, corset-inspired tops and dresses began to trend as part of the regencycore aesthetic, inspired by television series like Bridgerton and The Gilded Age. These designs only superficially resemble corsets and typically do not incorporate any form of boning.

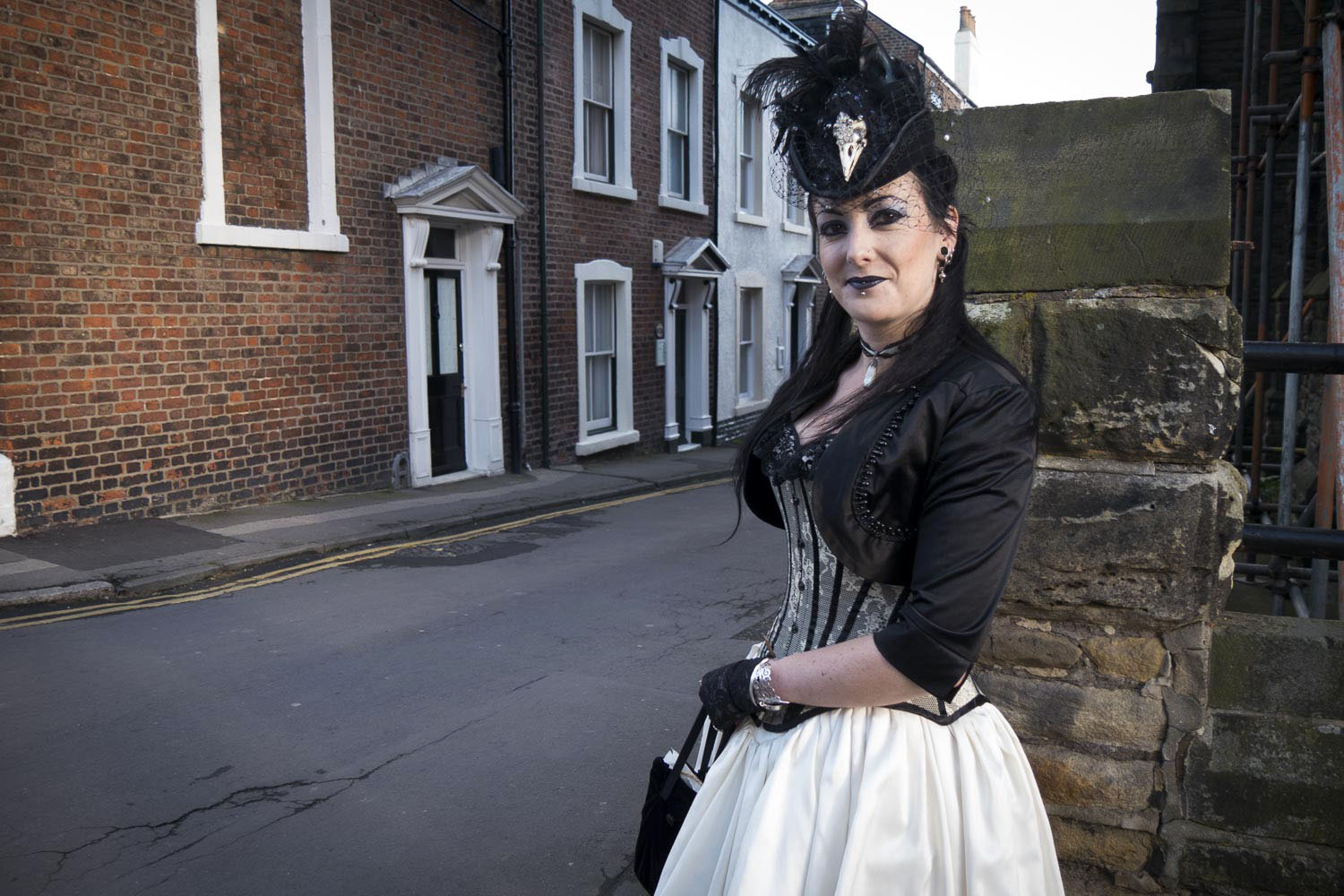
A goth woman wearing a corset

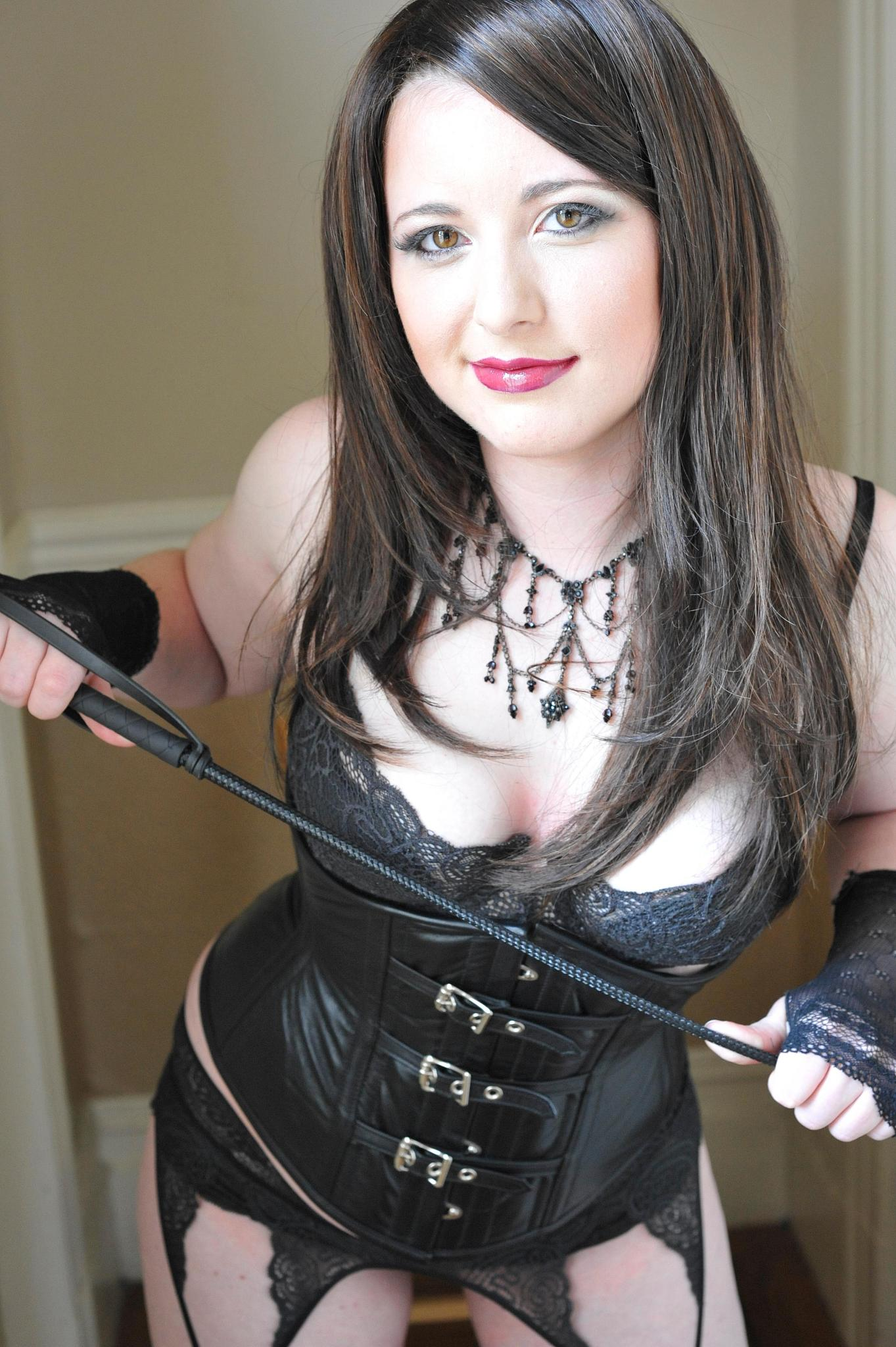
A dominatrix wearing a corset.

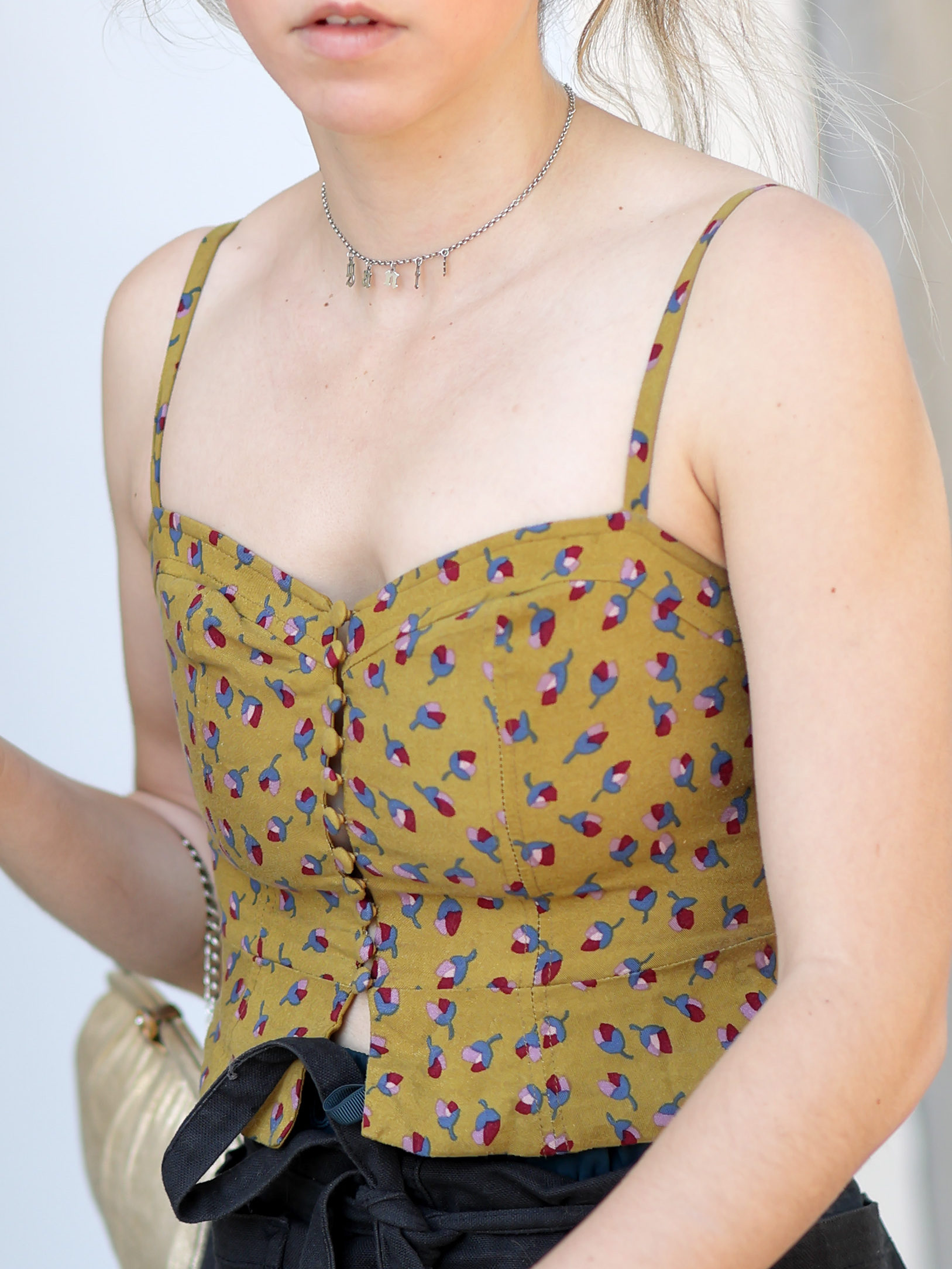
Corset-inspired tank top, 2021

== See also ==
- Bodice – Clothing for women and girls
- Corselette – Woman's foundation garment combining bra and girdle
- Dieting
- Rib removal
- Thin ideal
