= Corsetmaker =

Specialist tailor who makes corsets

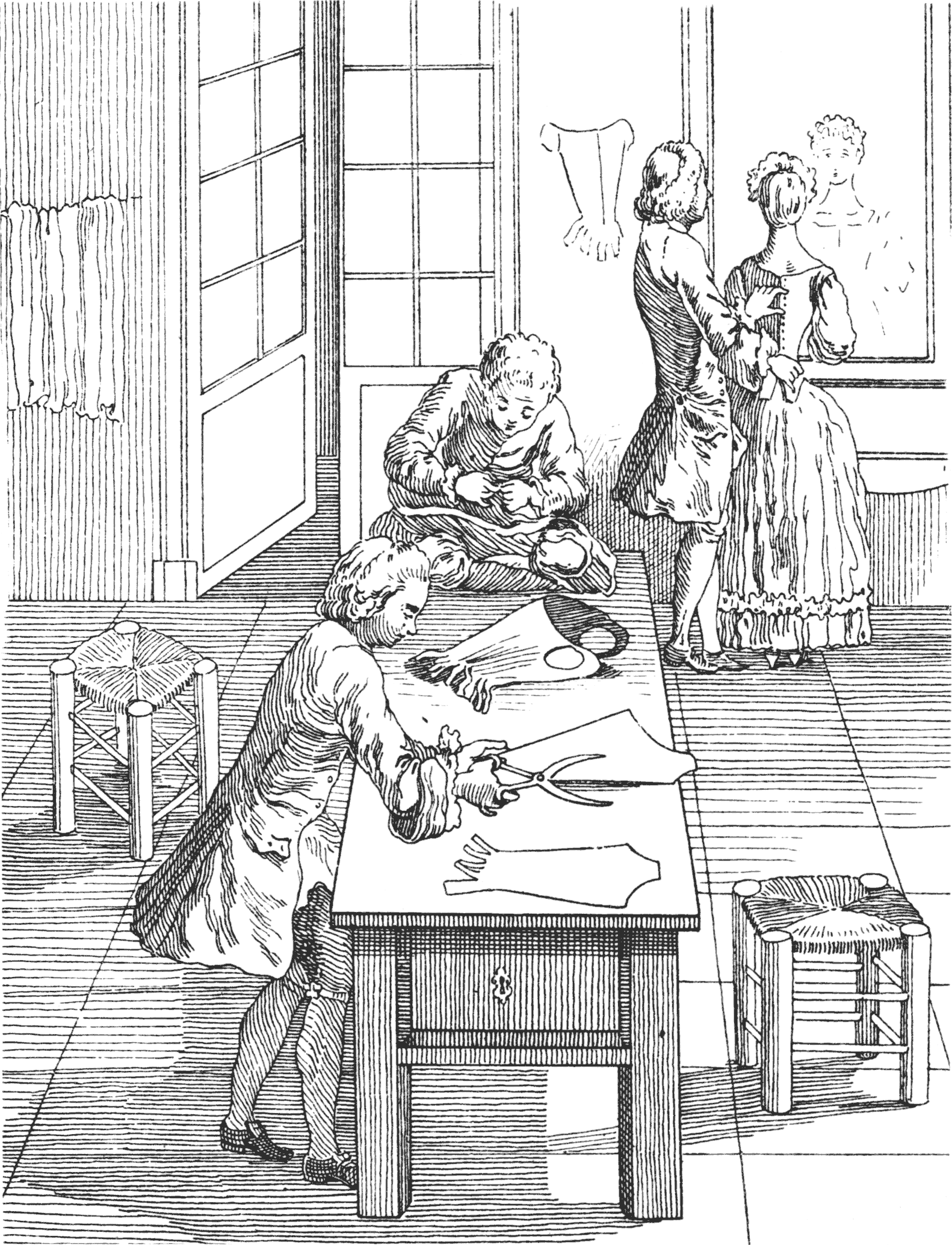
Corsetiers cutting out and fitting in the 18th century

A corsetmaker is a specialist tailor who makes corsets. Corsetmakers are frequently known by the French equivalent terms corsetier (male) and corsetière (female). Staymaker is an obsolete name for a corsetmaker.

== Design and distribution ==
Corsetmakers are tailors with knowledge of anatomy that enables them to construct well-fitting, corsets. Corsetmakers who reproduce historical styles must be familiar with historical fashions and costumes that span centuries of history. Individual corsetmakers often favour a certain style, and frequently have differing theories and opinions about the physical impact and benefits of various corsets, thereby influencing their corset design and creation.

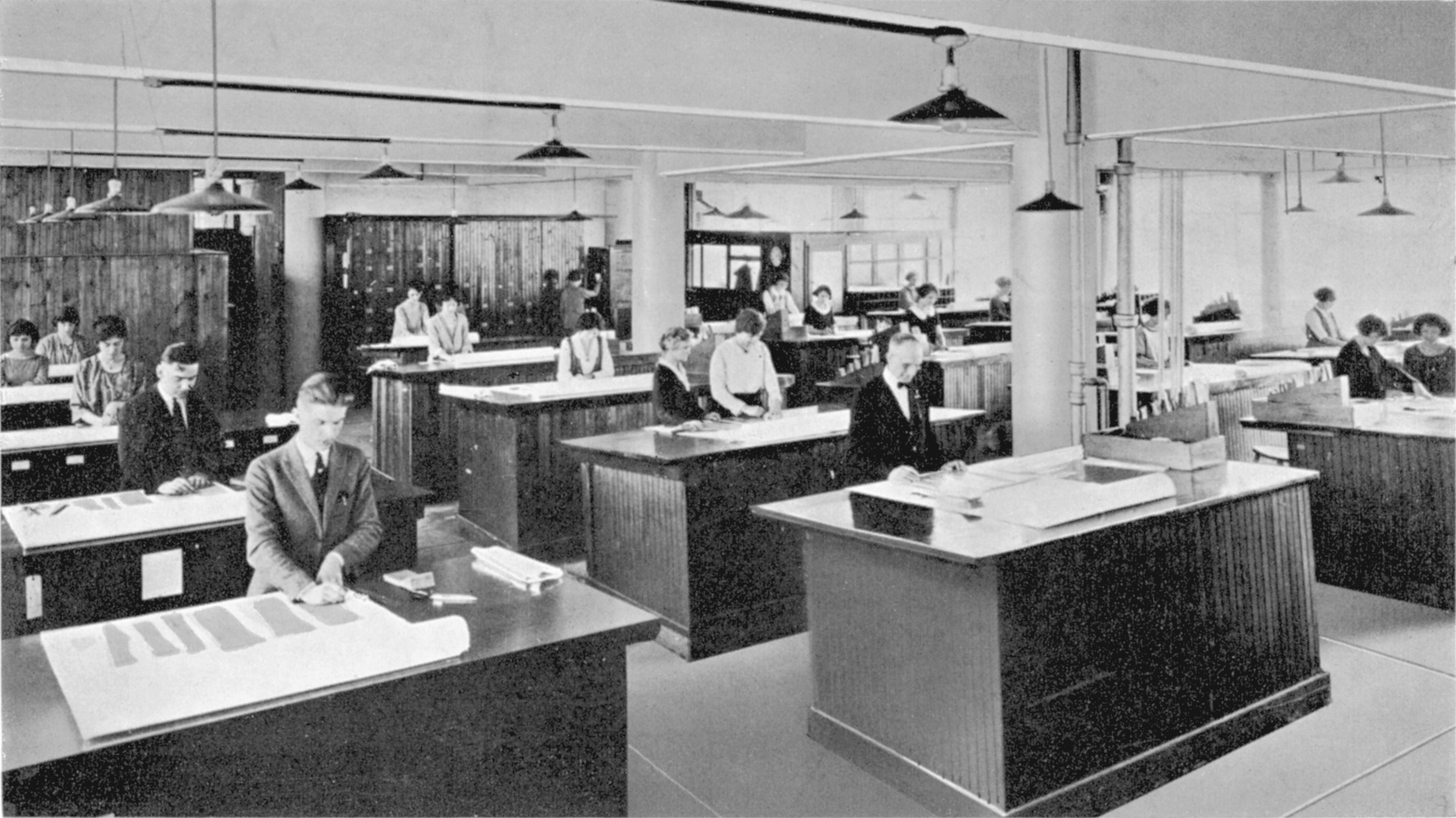
Corsetiers cutting fabric in 1928.

The main consideration of corset design is duration of use. For short-term use, e.g. used for a special event such as a wedding, a corset will be worn briefly and so is not subject to wear, therefore need not be of the highest quality of construction. For long-term use, e.g., by tightlacing or waist training, corsets must be made to exact standards and are best custom-fitted and designed for the individual wearer. Single weakness or flaws tend to be visible. Some custom-made gowns have corsets built into the design; a talented dressmaker may also be a skilled corset-maker.

Several companies employed travelling saleswomen, known as corsetières, who took orders for tailored corsets. Well-known are Spirella (1904–1989), Barcley, and Spenser.

== Notable corsetmakers ==
- Roxey Ann Caplin (1793–1888), British writer and inventor
- Catherine Allsop Griswold (fl. 1870s), a Connecticut corsetmaker who held 30 patents, the most of any woman in America at the time.
- Mr. Pearl (born 1962), South African corsetmaker to celebrities and collaborator with Vivienne Westwood
- Michaela Stark (born 1994), Australian corsetière, artist, and plus-size model

== See also ==
- Corset
- History of corsets
- Hourglass corset
- Tightlacing

== Books ==
- Doyle R. (1997)Waisted Efforts, An Illustrated Guide To Corset Making. Nova Scotia, Sartorial Press Publications, ISBN 0-9683039-0-0
- Tight Linings and Boning Mary Brooks Picken, 1920 Archive link
- The Practical Corsetiere Mme Ruth A. Rosenfeld 1933 Archive link
- The Basics Of Corset Building, A Handbook For Beginners by Linda Sparks (Author) ISBN 0-9737358-0-5
- Caplin - Health and Beauty (1864)
