= Catherine Allsop Griswold =

North American inventor and corsetmaker

Catherine Allsop Griswold was a corsetmaker whose 31 apparel-related patents played a role in the Dress Reform Movement of 1876. She had the most patents held by any woman in the United States at the time. Among her apparel-related patents was the skirt-supporting corset.

Griswold created more than 30 corset designs to better serve wearers from as early as 1866. 19 of the patents were related to improving the comfort of corsets for women by adjusting the mechanical design.

One of her most notable innovations was a corset that had skirt-supporting ribbons, which helped distribute the weight of heavier skirts over the entirety of a woman's body and allowed women to be less fatigued and have a greater range of movement.

When Griswold was resident in New York, the Worcester Corset Company manufactured her designs.

In 1893, Griswold's skirt-supporting corset won an award when it was featured at the World's Columbian Exposition in Chicago, where it appeared along with other dress-reform items, including a bust supporter by Olivia Flynt and another reform corset by Emmeline Philbrook.

A Madam Griswold's corset from 1876 is held by the Metropolitan Museum of Art.
