= Roxey Ann Caplin =

British writer and inventor

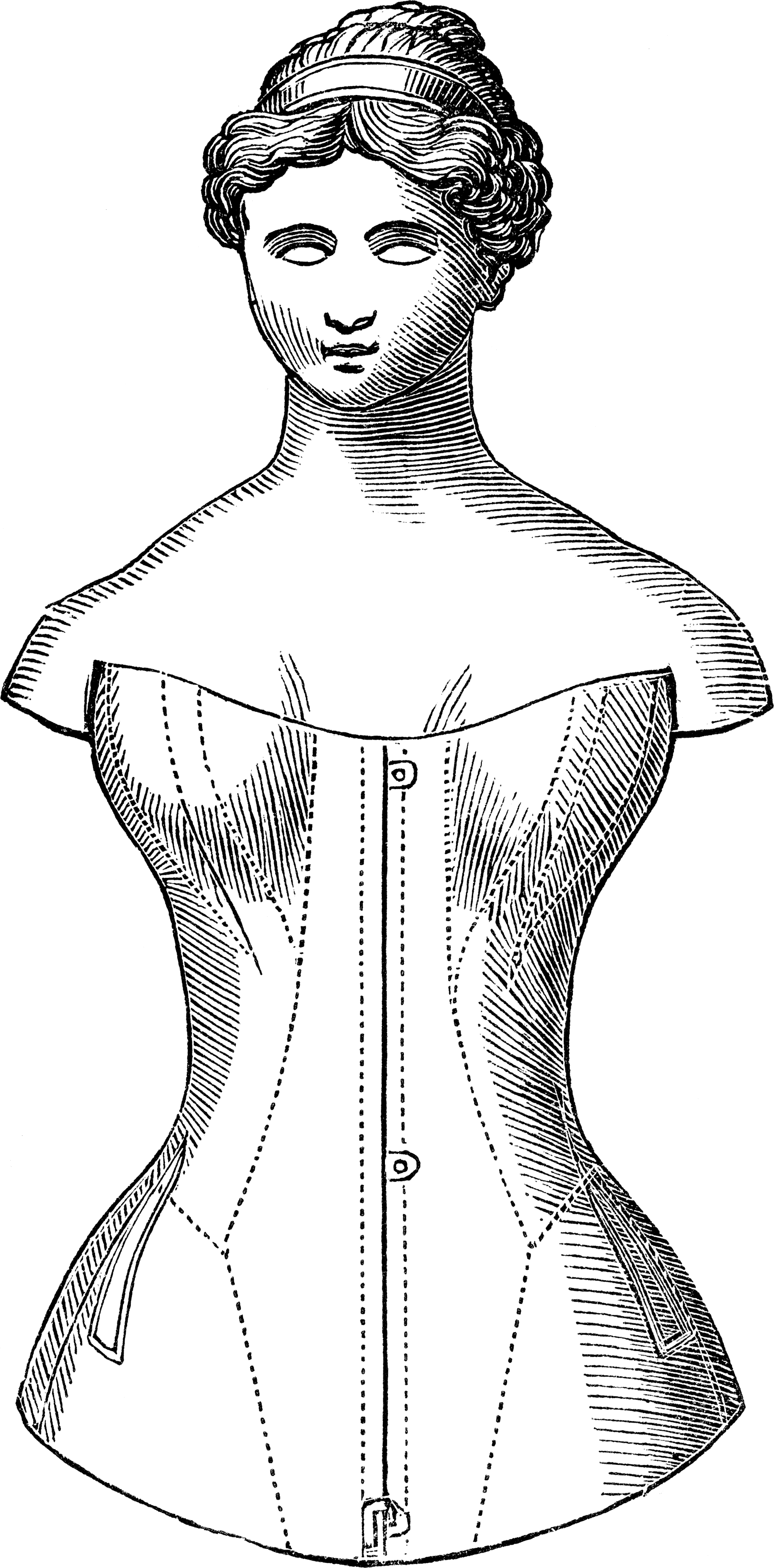
A corset invented by Roxey Ann Caplin.

Roxey Ann Caplin (c. 1793 – 2 August 1888) was a British writer and inventor.

== Biography ==
She was born in about 1793 in Canada. Around 1835, she married Jean Francois Isidore Caplin (c.1790-c.1872).

From 1839, Caplin was a corsetmaker working at 58 Berners Street, London.

At the Great Exhibition in 1851, she was awarded the "Manufacturer, Designer and Inventor" medal for her corsetry designs. The corsets from the Great Exhibition in 1851 are in the Museum of London.

In 1860, she became a member of the Royal Society for the Encouragement of Arts, Manufactures & Commerce (RSA). By 1864, she had filed 24 patents.

She died on 2 August 1888 at Cambridge Lodge, St Leonard's East Sheen in Surrey. Her effects were valued at £6452, a considerable estate for a tradesman in this period.

== Madame Caplin ==
How shall the poet, in a single lay,
the glory of her age and time portray?
Suffice if for the wondering world to mark
She took from all beside the medal in Hyde Park;
The only prize that was for corsets given
to any manufacturer under heaven.
Lo! the dazzling splendours of her fame advance
O'er 'All England' and the whole of France
She, the beloved, who now fills Brunswick's throne
Deals with Madame Caplin – her alone;
Why need I paint the heroine of my lays,
Or tell the land where passed her virgin days;
'Twas Canada!'-above all colonies renowned—
that heard my heroine's praises first resound,
You'll an incarnation of the graces meet
at No. 58 in Berners Street.
Science and pure benevolence combined,
A deity in human form enshrined;
Gracious demeanour, and courtly mien,
Learning and worth are thine, great Native queen.

== Selected works ==
- Health and Beauty: or, Woman and Her Clothing, Considered in Relation to the Physiological Laws of the Human Body (1850);
- Health and Beauty – 1854 version.
- Health and Beauty – 1856 version
- Health and Beauty – 1864 version.
- Woman and Her Wants; Four Lectures To Ladies (1860);
- Women in the Reign of the Queen Victoria (1876) with J. Mill.
