= Index of fashion articles =

This is a list of existing articles related to fashion and clothing. For individual designers, see List of fashion designers.

== 0–9 ==
- 1100–1200 in European fashion
- 1200–1300 in European fashion
- 1300–1400 in European fashion
- 1400–1500 in European fashion
- 1500–50 in Western European fashion
- 1550–1600 in Western European fashion
- 1600–50 in Western European fashion
- 1650–1700 in Western European fashion
- 1700–50 in Western fashion
- 1750–75 in Western fashion
- 1775–95 in Western fashion
- 1795–1820 in Western fashion
- 1820s in Western fashion
- 1830s in Western fashion
- 1840s in Western fashion
- 1850s in Western fashion
- 1860s in Western fashion
- 1870s in Western fashion
- 1880s in Western fashion
- 1890s in Western fashion
- 1900s in fashion
- 1910s in Western fashion
- 1920s in Western fashion
- 1930s in Western fashion
- 1940s in Western fashion
- 1950s in Western fashion
- 1960s in fashion
- 1970s in fashion
- 1980s in fashion
- 1990s in fashion
- 2000–09 in fashion
- 2010s in fashion

== A ==
- A-2 jacket
- A-line (clothing)
- Abacá
- Abaca slippers
- Abacost
- Abaniko
- Abarka
- Abaya
- Abolla
- Aboyne dress
- Academic dress
- Academic scarf
- Academic stole
- Achkan
- Acid dye
- Acrylic fiber
- Adaptive clothing
- Adjustable-focus eyeglasses
- Adornment
- Afghan (blanket)
- Afghan Coat
- Afghanka
- African textiles
- Afro
- Afterwear
- Agal (accessory)
- Aglet
- Aguayo (cloth)
- Aida cloth
- Aigrette
- Aiguillette
- Aiguillette (ornament)
- Aikidogi
- Ajrak
- Alasho
- Alb
- Albanian hat
- Alençon lace
- Alice in Wonderland dress
- All over print
- Aloha shirt
- Alpaca fiber
- Altdeutsche Tracht
- Amauti
- Amice
- Ammunition boot
- Anglo-Saxon dress
- Angora wool
- Angusticlavia
- Animal print
- Anklet (sock)
- Annie Hall
- Anorak
- Anthony Eden hat
- Antique satin
- Antistatic garments
- Antwerp lace
- Áo bà ba
- Ao dai
- Áo gấm
- Áo tứ thân
- Apex (headdress)
- Apostolnik
- Appliqué
- Appliqué lace
- Approach shoe
- Apron
- Araimudi
- Aran jumper
- Arch support
- Archducal hat
- Architectonic jewellery
- Argentan lace
- Argyle (pattern)
- Arkhalig
- Arm ring
- Arm warmer
- Armenian dress
- Armet
- Armscye
- Art jewelry
- Artificial hair integrations
- Artificial leather
- Ascot cap
- Ascot tie
- Aso Oke fabric
- Aso Oke hat
- Assam silk
- Asymmetric cut
- Assyrian clothing
- Athleisure
- Atilla (clothing)
- Attic helmet
- Attifet
- Australian Aboriginal fibrecraft
- Australian Fashion Week
- Australian work boot
- Av Pak
- Avarca (shoe)
- Ave Maria lace
- Aventail
- Aviator hat
- Away colours
- Ayam (cap)
- Aztec clothing

== B ==
- Baby sling
- Babydoll
- Back closure
- Backcombing
- Backless dress
- Backpack
- Baggies (clothing)
- Baggy green
- Bahag (garment)
- Baja Jacket
- Baji (clothing)
- Baju Kurung
- Baju Melayu
- Bakhu
- Bakya
- Balaclava (clothing)
- Baldness
- Baldric(k)
- Balgha
- Ball dress
- Ball gown
- Ballerina neckline
- Ballerina skirt
- Ballet boot
- Ballet flat
- Ballet shoe
- Ballet tutu
- Ballistic vest
- Balmoral bonnet
- Baluchar Sari
- Bamboo
- Banarasi sari
- Banbi
- Band collar
- Bandeau
- Bandhani
- Bandolier
- Bands (neckwear)
- Bangle
- Banyan (clothing)
- Baptismal clothing
- Bar tack
- Barathea
- Barbute
- Baro't saya
- Barong tagalog
- Barretina
- Barrette
- Bascinet
- Baseball cap
- Baseball glove
- Baseball uniform
- Bases (fashion)
- Bashlyk
- Basque (clothing)
- Bast fibre
- Bast shoe
- Bathing dress
- Bathrobe
- Batik
- Batiste
- Batsuit
- Battenberg lace
- Batting glove
- Batting helmet
- Battle Dress
- Battle jacket
- Battledress
- Bead
- Bead crochet
- Beadwork
- Beanie (North America)
- Bearskin
- Beatle boot
- Beaver hat
- Beca (garment)
- Bed jacket
- Bedgown
- Bedford cord
- Beetlewing
- Beetling
- Beizi
- Bekishe
- Bell sleeve
- Bell-bottoms
- Bell-boy hat
- Bell-boy jacket
- Belly chain
- Belt (clothing)
- Belt buckle
- Belt hook
- Belted plaid
- Bench shirt
- Beonggeoji
- Beoseon
- Beret
- Bergère hat
- Berlin Iron Jewellery
- Bermuda shorts
- Bernos
- Bespoke
- Bhaad-gaaule
- Bias (textile)
- Bib (garment)
- Biblical clothing
- Biblical sandals
- Bicorne
- Big hair
- Bikini
- Bikini variants
- Bilum
- Binche lace
- Bindi (decoration)
- Bindle
- Binyeo
- Biretta
- Birkenstock
- Birkin bag
- Birrus
- Bishop Andrewes cap
- Bisht (clothing)
- Black beret
- Black cap
- Black tie
- Blackwork
- Blangkon
- Blanket sleeper
- Blanket stitch
- Blazer
- Bling-bling
- Blonde lace
- Bloomers (clothing)
- Blouse
- Blouson
- Blucher shoe
- Bluecoat
- Boardshorts
- Boar's tusk helmet
- Boat neck
- Boat shoes
- Boater
- Bob cut
- Bobbin lace
- Bobble hat
- Bobby pin
- Bobby sock
- Bobby soxer
- Bògòlanfini
- Bodice
- Body modification
- Bodystocking
- Bodysuit
- Boeotian helmet
- Bokgeon
- Bolo tie
- Bondage pants
- Bondage corset
- Bone (corsetry)
- Bone lace
- Bonnet (headgear)
- Book bag
- Boonie hat
- Boot
- Boot fetishism
- Boot jack
- Boot socks
- Bootee
- Boothose
- Boshiya
- Boss of the Plains
- Boston Fashion Week
- Boubou (clothing)
- Bouclé
- Bouffant
- Bouffant gown
- Boutonnière
- Bow tie
- Bowler hat
- Bowling shirt
- Bowyangs
- Boxer briefs
- Boxer shorts
- Boxing glove
- Boyar hat
- Boyfriend (fashion)
- Braccae
- Bracteate
- Braid
- Braiding machine
- Braies
- Brassard
- Bra
- Brassiere measurement
- Brazilian Jiu-Jitsu gi
- Breathability
- Breechcloth
- Breeches
- Breeching (boys)
- Breeks
- Brez (clothing)
- Briefcase
- Briefs
- Brigandine
- Bristle
- British Fashion Awards
- British Fashion Council
- British Inspiration Awards
- Broadcloth
- Brocade
- Broderie Anglaise
- Brogan (shoes)
- Brogue shoe
- Brooch
- Broomstick lace
- Brothel creeper
- Browline glasses
- Brunswick (clothing)
- Brussels lace
- Bucket hat
- Buckle
- Buckram
- Bucks point lace
- Buckskin (leather)
- Buckskins
- Budenovka
- Buff coat
- Buffalo coat
- Buka cloak
- Bun (hairstyle)
- Bunad
- Bunny boots
- Bunny slippers
- Burgonet
- Burka (overcoat)
- Burnout (clothing)
- Burnous
- Burqa
- Burqini
- Busby
- Business casual
- Busk
- Buskin
- Bustier
- Bustle
- Bustle (regalia)
- Button
- Button blanket
- Buttonhole
- Buyer (fashion)
- Buzz cut
- BWH
- Bycocket
- Byssus
- Byzantine chain
- Byzantine dress
- Byzantine silk

== C ==
- Cabbage-tree hat
- Cable knitting
- Cache-cœur
- Cache-sexe
- Cagoule
- Calendering
- Calfskin
- Calico (textile)
- Caligae
- Camauro
- Cambric
- Camel hair
- Camisa blouse
- Camisole
- Camlet
- Camocas
- Camp shirt
- Campaign hat
- Can-can dress
- Canadian military fur wedge cap
- Candlewicking
- Canepin
- Canezou
- Canterbury cap
- Canvas
- Cap
- Cap (sport)
- Cap badge
- Cap of Maintenance
- Capalana
- Cape
- Capeline
- Capirote
- Capotain
- Cappello Alpino
- Cappello romano
- Capri pants
- Capuchon
- Caraco
- Cardigan (sweater)
- Carding
- Cargo pants
- Carmagnole
- Carpenter jeans
- Carpet bag
- Capsule wardrobe
- Carrickmacross lace
- Cashmere wool
- Casquette
- Casquette d'Afrique
- Cassock
- Casual attire
- Casual Friday
- Casual (subculture)
- Cat eye glasses
- Catholic school uniform
- Catsuit
- Caubeen
- Caul (headgear)
  - disambiguation: Caul fat
  - disambiguation: En caul
- Caulk boots
- Cavalier boots
- Cavalier hat
- Cellulose
- Celtic brooch
- Ceremonial clothing in Western cultures
- Ceremonial dress
- Cervelliere
- Cestus
- Chador
- Chalcidian helmet
- Chamanto
- Chamois leather
- Championship belt
- Chang kben
- Chang'ao
- Changshan
- Chantilly lace
- Chap boot
- Chapan
- Chapatsu
- Chapeau
- Chaperon (headgear)
- Chaplet (headgear)
- Chaps
- Charm bracelet
- Charmeuse
- Chastity belt
- Chasuble
- Chatelaine (chain)
- Chausses
- Che Guevara in fashion
- Cheerleading uniform
- Cheesecloth
- Chef's uniform
- Chelsea boot
- Chemise
- Chemise cagoule
- Chemisette
- Chenille fabric
- Cheongsam
- Cheopji
- Chesterfield coat
- Chic (style)
- Chicken suit
- Chiffon (clothing)
- Chiffon (fabric)
- Chignon (hairstyle)
- Chikan (embroidery)
- Children's clothing
- Chilote cap
- Chilote poncho
- Chima (clothing)
- Chima jeogori
- Chimere
- Chinese academic dress
- Chinese clothing
- Chino cloth
- Chintz
- Chiton (costume)
- Chlamys
- Choga (garment)
- Choir dress
- Choker
- Chokha
- Choli
- Choora
- Chopine
- Christian clothing
- Christian headcovering
- Chuba
- Chugha
- Chukka boot
- Chullo
- Chupalla
- Churidar
- Cieszyn folk costume
- Cilice
- Cincture
- Circlet
- Clear heels
- Cleat (shoe)
- Cleavage (breasts)
- Cleavage enhancement
- Clerical clothing
- Clerical collar
- Climbing shoe
- Clip-on tie
- Cloak
- Cloche hat
- Close-bodied gown
- Close helm
- Close helmet
- Clothing fetish
- Clothing in Africa
- Clothing in ancient Egypt
- Clothing in ancient Greece
- Clothing in ancient Rome
- Clothing in India
- Clothing in Mauritius
- Clothing in the ancient world
- Clothing in the Ragtime Era
- Clothing insulation
- Clothing laws by country
- Clothing material
- Clothing sizes
- Clothing technology
- Clothing terminology
- Clog (British)
- Clog (shoe)
- Clubwear
- Clutch (pin fastener)
- Coat (clothing)
- Coat pocket
- Cockade
- Cockernonnie
- Cocktail dress
- Cocktail hat
- Coconut jewelry
- Codpiece
- Coif
- Coin purse
- Cointoise
- Coir
- Collar (BDSM)
- Collar (clothing)
- Collar (jewelry)
- Collar pin
- Collar stays
- Colobium sindonis
- Colour fastness
- Coloured hat
- Combat boot
- Combing
- Compression garment
- Compression shorts
- Compression sportswear
- Compression stockings
- Concert T-shirt
- Conical Asian hat
- Contemporary Western wedding dress
- Cooling vest
- Coolus helmet
- Coonskin cap
- Cooper A-2 jacket
- Cope
- Coppola (cap)
- Çorape
- Copyright law of fashion design
- Corduroy
- Cork hat
- Corinthian helmet
- Cornette
- Cornrows
- Corolla (headgear)
- Coronet
- Corsage
- Corsage (bodice)
- Corselette
- Corset
- Corslet
- Cosmetics
- Cosmetics in Ancient Rome
- Cosmetics in the 1920s
- Cosplay
- Costume
- Costume de rigueur
- Costume jewelry
- Cotton
- Cotton duck
- Coty Award
- Council of Fashion Designers of America
- Court dress
- Court shoe
- Court uniform and dress
- Courtepy
- Coutil
- Couturier
- Cowboy boot
- Cowboy hat
- Cowhide
- Cowichan knitting
- Cowl
- Crakow (shoe)
- Crape
- Cravat
- Cretonne
- Crew cut
- Crew neck
- Crew sock
- Cricket cap
- Cricket whites
- Crinoline
- Croatian national costume
- Crochet
- Crochet thread
- Crocheted lace
- Crop (hairstyle)
- Crop top
- Cross country running shoes
- Cross necklace
- Crown (headgear)
- Cruise collection
- Cuban heel
- Cuff
- Cufflink
- Culottes
- Cummerbund
- Cuprammonium rayon
- Custodian helmet
- Cut and sew
- Cut-off
- Cut-resistant gloves
- Cycling glove
- Cycling shoe
- Cycling shorts
- Czapka

== D ==
- Daenggi
- Dalmatic
- Damask
- Dance belt
- Dandy
- Dangui
- Daopao
- Dark adaptor goggles
- Dart (sewing)
- Dashiki
- Dastar
- Daura-Suruwal
- Daxiushan
- Débutante dress
- Décolletage
- Deel (clothing)
- Deely bobber
- Deerskin trade
- Deerstalker
- Delia (clothing)
- Delphos gown
- Denim
- Denim skirt
- Denison smock
- Dép lốp
- Derby shoe
- Designer clothing
- Designer label
- Desizing
- Detachable collar
- Deubré
- Devilock
- Devoré
- Dhaka topi
- Dhakai
- Dhoti
- Diabetic sock
- Diadem
- Diaper
- Diaper bag
- Dickey (garment)
- Dillybag
- Dimity
- Diplomatic uniform
- Dirndl
- Disruptive Pattern Combat Uniform
- Disruptive Pattern Material
- Ditto suit
- Diving suit
- Diyi
- Djellaba
- Do-rag
- Dobok
- Doctoral hat
- Dolly Varden (costume)
- Dolman
- Dolphin shorts
- Domino mask
- Donegal tweed
- Donkey jacket
- Doobon coat
- Dopo (clothing)
- Dopp kit
- Doppa
- Dotted Swiss (Fabric)
- Double cloth
- Double-breasted
- Double knitting
- Doublet (clothing)
- Down feather
- Drag (clothing)
- Drape suit
- Draped garment
- Drapery
- Drawstring
- Dreadlocks
- Dress
- Dress boot
- Dress code
- Dress code (Western)
- Dress of the Year
- Dress pants
- Dress shirt
- Dress shoe
- Dress socks
- Dress uniform
- Driglam namzha
- Drill (fabric)
- Driving glove
- Driving moccasins
- Driza-Bone
- Duffel bag
- Duffle coat
- Dumalla
- Dumdyam
- Dumpra
- Dunce cap
- Dupatta
- Dupioni
- Durumagi
- Dush-toh
- Duster (clothing)
- Dutch cap
- Dutch Fashion Awards
- Duty armband
- Dwikkoji
- Dye
- Dyeing

== E ==
- E-textiles
- Early medieval European dress
- Earmuffs
- Earring
- Easter bonnet
- Earth shoe
- Edible underwear
- Eisenhower jacket
- Elastomer
- Electric jacket
- Elevator shoes
- Elle Style Awards
- Embroidery
- Empire silhouette
- EN 13402
- End-on-end
- Energy dome
- Engageante
- Engineer boot
- English medieval clothing
- Engolpion
- Epanokamelavkion
- Epaulette
- Ephod
- Epigonation
- Epimanikia
- Episcopal sandals
- Epitrachil
- Equestrian helmet
- Eri silk
- Espadrille
- Ethiopian coffee dress
- Ethiopian suit
- Eton crop
- Etruscan jewelry
- Eunjangdo
- Evening glove
- Evening gown
- Exerlopers
- Exomis
- Extraocular implant
- Extreme environment clothing
- Eyelet
- Eyepatch

== F ==
- Facekini
- Facing (sewing)
- Facing colour
- Faggoting (knitting)
- Fáinne
- Fair Isle (technique)
- Fake fur
- Falling buffe
- Falsies
- Faluche
- Fanny pack
- Faroese shawl
- Farshi Pajama
- Farthingale
- Fascia (vestment)
- Fascinator
- Fashion
- Fashion accessory
- Fashion cigarettes
- Fashion capital
- Fashion doll
- Fashion entrepreneur
- Fashion forecasting
- Fashion in the United States
- Fashion law
- Fashion matrix
- Fashion merchandising
- Fashion museum
- Fashion plate
- Fashion week
- Fast fashion
- Feather boa
- Feather bonnet
- Feather cloak
- Feather tights
- Featherstitch
- Fedora
- Felt
- Ferreruolo
- Fetish fashion
- Fez (hat)
- Fiber
- Fibroin
- Fibula (brooch)
- Fichu
- Field sign
- Filet crochet
- Filet lace
- Fillet (clothing)
- Finding
- Finger wave
- Fishnet
- Flak jacket
- Flame retardant
- Flamenco shoes
- Flannel
- Flannel vest
- Flapper
- Flax
- Flight jacket
- Flight suit
- Flip-flops
- Flipsters
- Floating canvas
- Flocking (texture)
- Flogger (fashion)
- Fly (clothing)
- Fly plaid
- Focale
- Fofudja
- Folk costume
- Fontange
- Foot binding
- Football boot
- Footwraps
- Forage cap
- Form-fitting garment
- Formal Thai national costume
- Formal trousers
- Formal wear
- Foulard
- Foundation (cosmetics)
- Foundation garment
- Four-in-hand knot
- Four Winds hat
- Fouta towels
- Freezy Freakies
- French braid
- French hood
- French knickers
- French twist (hairstyle)
- Friendship bracelet
- Frieze (textile)
- Fringe (hair)
- Fringe (trim)
- Frock
- Frock coat
- Frog (fastening)
- Fruit hat
- Fuck-me shoes
- Full dress
- Full plaid
- Fulling
- Fully fashioned stockings
- Fundoshi
- Furisode
- Fur
- Fur clothing
- Fursuit
- Fustanella
- Fustian

== G ==
- G-1 military flight jacket
- G-string
- Gabardine
- Gaberdine
- Gable hood
- Gache
- Gagra choli
- Gaiters
- Gajra
- Gákti
- Galea (helmet)
- Galero
- Galesh
- Galloon
- Galoshes
- Gambeson
- Gamine
- Gamosa
- Gamsbart
- Gamucha
- Gamurra
- Gandhi cap
- Ganguro
- Ganse cord
- Garibaldi shirt
- Garot
- Gartel
- Garter (stockings)
- Gat (hat)
- Gather (sewing)
- Gauge (knitting)
- Gaung baung
- Gauntlet (glove)
- Gauze
- Gel bracelet
- Geneva gown
- Genital jewellery
- Geodeulji
- Georgette (fabric)
- Geotextiles
- Geta (footwear)
- Geumbak
- Ghanaian smock
- Gharara
- Ghillie shirt
- Ghillie suit
- Ghillies (dance)
- Gho
- Għonnella
- Ghoonghat
- Ghost shirt
- Ghungroo
- GI glasses
- Gilet
- Gimp (thread)
- Gingham
- Girdle
- Girdle book
- Girl boxers
- Giveh
- Gladstone bag
- Glamour (presentation)
- Glass fiber
- Glasses
- Glen plaid
- Glengarry
- Glossary of dyeing terms
- Glossary of sewing terms
- Glossary of textile manufacturing
- Glossary of textile terminology
- Glove
- Glove (ice hockey)
- Go-go boot
- Goatskin (material)
- Godet (sewing)
- Goggle jacket
- Goggles
- Going commando
- Gold-filled jewelry
- Golden hat
- Gomesi
- Gomusin
- Gonryongpo
- Gook (headgear)
- Gore (segment)
- Gore-Tex
- Gorget
- Gota Work
- Gothic fashion
- Gown
- Gowni
- Grameen Check
- Grandfather shirt
- Granny square
- Grass skirt
- Greatcoat
- Great helm
- Grecian bend
- Greek Army uniforms
- Greek fisherman's cap
- Green beret
- Green eyeshade
- Green jersey
- Grenadine (cloth)
- Grill (jewelry)
- Grommet
- Grosgrain
- Grotulja
- Guayabera
- Guernsey (clothing)
- Gugel
- Guimpe
- Gulle
- Gusset
- Gwanbok
- Gyaru
- Gymnasterka
- Gymslip

== H ==
- Haapsalu shawl
- Habesha kemis
- Hachimaki
- Hackle
- Hadagi
- Haferlschuh
- Hair crimping
- Hair drop
- Hair jewellery
- Hair stick
- Hair tie
- Hairnet
- Hairpin (fashion)
- Hairpin lace
- Hakama
- Half-Windsor knot
- Halterneck
- Hammer pants
- Han Chinese clothing
- Hanbok
- Hand knitting
- Handbag
- Handkerchief
- Handkerchief skirt
- Hanfu movement
- Hangaroc
- Hanten
- Happi
- Haramaki (clothing)
- Hard hat
- Hardee hat
- Harem pants
- Harrington jacket
- Harris tweed
- Hat
- Hat Act
- Hat tax
- Hatpin
- Hatstand
- Hauberk
- Haute couture
- Haversack
- Head tie
- Headband
- Headgear
- Headgear (martial arts)
- Headpiece
- Headscarf
- Heated clothing
- Heather (fabric)
- Heel (shoe)
- Heelys
- Hejazi turban
- Helmet
- Helmet (cricket)
- Hem
- Hemline
- Hemline index
- Hemp
- Hemp jewelry
- Henley shirt
- Hennin
- Herringbone (cloth)
- Hessian (boot)
- High-low skirt
- High-technology swimwear fabric
- High-top
- High-visibility clothing
- Highland dress
- Hijab
- Hijab by country
- Hiking boot
- Himation
- Hime cut
- Hip and buttock padding
- Hip boot
- Hip-hop fashion
- Hip-huggers
- History of brassieres
- History of clothing and textiles
- History of corsets
- History of jewelry in Ukraine
- History of knitting
- History of silk
- History of suits
- History of the bikini
- History of the kilt
- Hnyat-phanat
- Hobble skirt
- Hobnail
- Hobo bag
- Hockey helmet
- Hockey pants
- Hogeon
- Holbeinesque jewellery
- Hold-ups
- Holdall
- Holland cloth
- Homburg (hat)
- Hōmongi
- Honeycomb
- Hongreline
- Honiton lace
- Hood (headgear)
- Hoodie
- Hook-and-eye closure
- Hoop skirt
- Horn-rimmed glasses
- Horned helmet
- Horsehair
- Hose (clothing)
- Hosiery
- Houndstooth
- Hounskull
- Houppelande
- Hourglass corset
- Hoxton knot
- Huarache (running shoe)
- Huarache (shoe)
- Huipil
- Humeral veil
- Hwa
- Hwagwan
- Hwarot
- Hypercolor

== I ==
- Ice skate
- Icelandic national costume
- Icelandic tail-cap
- Ihram clothing
- Ikat
- Ilkal saree
- Illyrian type helmet
- Imperial helmet
- Imperial Japanese Army Uniforms
- Imperial yellow jacket
- Inline skate
- Insolia
- Indian wedding clothes
- Indigo dye
- Indo-Western clothing
- Infant bodysuit
- Infant's binder
- Informal attire
- Intarsia (knitting)
- Interfacing
- International Best Dressed List
- Inverness cape
- Inverness coat
- Irish clothing
- Irish lace
- Irish linen
- Iron-on
- It Bag
- Italian charm bracelet
- Isiagu
- Islam and clothing
- Islamic dress in Europe
- Izaar

== J ==
- Jaapi
- Jabot (neckwear)
- Jackboot
- Jacket
- Jacket lapel
- Jacquard
- Jamavar
- Jamdani
- Jangot
- Japanese armour
- Japanese clothing
- Japanese school uniform
- Jazerant
- Jazz shoe
- Jeans
- Jeep cap
- Jeggings
- Jelebiya
- Jelick
- Jellabiya
- Jelly shoes
- Jeogori
- Jeonbok
- Jeongjagwan
- Jerkin (garment)
- Jersey (clothing)
- Jersey (fabric)
- Jet (lignite)
- Jewellery
- Jewellery in the Pacific
- Jewelry design
- Jewish hat
- Jewish religious clothing
- Jilbāb
- Jika-tabi
- Jinbei
- Jingle dress
- Jipsin
- Jobawi
- Jockstrap
- Jodhpur boot
- Jodhpuri
- Jodhpurs
- Jōe
- Jokduri
- Jorabs
- Jubba
- Judogi
- Jujutsugi
- Juliet cap
- Jump boot
- Jump smock
- Jumper (dress)
- Jumpsuit
- Jūnihitoe
- Jupe (jacket)
- Jussishirt
- Justacorps
- Jute
- Jutti

== K ==
- Kabney
- Kacchera
- Kaftan
- Kalaghai
- Kalamkari
- Kalimavkion
- Kamleika
- Kanchipuram Sari
- Kanga (African garment)
- Kantha
- Kanthi Mala
- Kanzashi
- Kalpak
- Kanzu
- Kapa
- Kappōgi
- Karakul (hat)
- Karate belts
- Karate gi
- Kariba suit
- Kariyushi shirt
- Kaross
- Karvalakki
- Kasa (hat)
- Kasaya (clothing)
- Kashket
- Kasket
- Kasta sari
- Kasuti
- Kate-bukuro
- Kate Middleton effect
- Kausia
- Kebaya
- Keffiyeh
- Kegelhelm
- Keikogi
- Kemp (wool)
- Kente cloth
- Kepi
- Kerchief
- Kerseymere
- Kesh (Sikhism)
- Keski
- Kettle hat
- Khādī
- Khaki
- Khaki drill
- Khalat
- Khăn rằn
- Khandua
- Khara Dupatta
- Khata
- Khmer clothing
- Kho (costume)
- Kiahan (kyahan)
- Kidan Habesha
- Kidney belt
- Kiekie (clothing)
- Kijōka-bashōfu
- Kilt
- Kilt accessories
- Kilt pin
- Kimono
- Kiondo
- Kippah
- Kipper tie
- Kira (Bhutan)
- Kirtle
- Kirza
- Kitenge
- Kittel
- Kitten heel
- Kitty Foyle (dress)
- Kkachi durumagi
- Klomp
- Klobuk
- Knee-high boot
- Knee highs
- Knickerbockers (clothing)
- Knitted fabric
- Knitting
- Knochensack
- Kofia (hat)
- Kokoshnik
- Kolhapuri chappal
- Kolpik
- Kolpos
- Konos (helmet)
- Kontusz
- Korean school uniform
- Kosa silk
- Kosode
- Kosovorotka
- Kota Doria
- Koteka
- Koto (traditional clothing)
- Koukoulion
- Kowpeenam
- Kozhukh
- Kozhushanka
- Krama
- Kroje
- Kubi bukuro
- Kufi
- Kumihimo
- Kumkum
- Kundan
- Kupiah
- Kurdish clothing
- Kurta
- Kurtka
- Kuta (clothing)
- Kuthampully Saree

== L ==
- Lace
- Lace wig
- Lacrosse glove
- Lamba (garment)
- Lambswool
- Lamé (fabric)
- Langa oni
- Langota
- Lap-lap
- Lapel pin
- Lappet
- Late Roman ridge helmet
- Latex clothing
- Laticlave
- Laundry
- Laundry symbol
- Laurel wreath
- Lava-lava
- Lavalier
- Lawn cloth
- Layered clothing
- Layered hair
- Layette
- Le Smoking
- Leading strings
- Leather
- Leather helmet
- Leather jacket
- Leather skirt
- Lederhosen
- Leg warmer
- Leggings
- Legskin
- Lehenga Style Saree
- Lei (garland)
- Lèine bhàn
- Leisure suit
- Lensless glasses
- Letterman (sports)
- Liberty bodice
- Liberty spikes
- Lightweight Rucksack
- Lika cap
- Limerick lace
- Linen
- Linen clothes
- Lingerie
- Lingerie tape
- Lining (sewing)
- Liqui liqui
- Liripipe
- List of boots
- List of bra designs
- List of crochet stitches
- List of Han Chinese clothing
- List of hat styles
- List of headgear
- List of individual dresses
- List of Korean clothing
- List of shoe styles
- List of types of fur
- List of types of sartorial hijab
- List of World War II uniforms and clothing
- List of yarns for crochet and knitting
- Little black dress
- Little Lord Fauntleroy
- Livery
- Livery collar
- Llauto
- Lock ring
- Lock stitch
- Locking clothing
- Loculus (satchel)
- Loden cape
- Loincloth
- Lolita fashion
- London Fashion Week
- Long hair
- Long-sleeved T-shirt
- Long underwear
- Longcloth
- Longyi
- Lookbook
- Loom
- Loose socks
- Lopapeysa
- Lorgnette
- Lotus shoes
- Love beads
- Low cut sock
- Low-rise jeans
- Luckenbooth brooch
- Lugade
- Luhkka
- Lungi
- Lurex (yarn)
- Lusekofte
- Lux Style Award
- Lyocell

== M ==
- M-1941 field jacket
- M-1951 field jacket
- M-1965 field jacket
- M42 jacket
- M43 field cap
- MA-1 bomber jacket
- MA-2 bomber jacket
- Macaroni (fashion)
- Mackinaw cloth
- Mackintosh (brand)
- Mackintosh (raincoat)
- Macramé
- Made to measure
- Madiba shirt
- Madisar
- Madras (cloth)
- Madras (costume)
- Magnetic boots
- Magoja
- Mahiole
- Mail (armour)
- Maillot
- Makarapa
- Malaysian batik
- Malaysian cultural outfits
- Malaysian school uniform
- Male bra
- Malong
- Mandarin collar
- Mandarin square
- Mangalsutra
- Manggeon
- MANGO Fashion Awards
- Mandilion
- Manila shawl
- Manillas
- Maniple (vestment)
- Manta (dress)
- Mantelletta
- Mantilla
- Mantle (clothing)
- Mantle (vesture)
- Mantua (clothing)
- Mantyhose
- Mao suit
- Māori traditional textiles
- Marcasite jewellery
- Marcelling
- Maria Clara gown
- Maroon beret
- Mask
- Mary Jane (shoe)
- Matchy-Matchy
- Matelassé
- Maternity clothing
- Matron's badge
- Mawashi
- Maxi dress
- Maya textiles
- Mechanical watch
- Mechlin lace
- Medical bag
- Medical gloves
- Medical identification tag
- Medicine bag
- Medieval jewelry
- Mekhela chador
- Men's skirts
- Mengu (Japanese facial armour)
- Mercerised cotton
- Merino
- Mesh
- Mess dress
- Mess jacket
- Messenger bag
- Metal corset
- Metallic fiber
- Mexican pointy boots
- Microfiber
- Microskirt
- Midriff
- Milan Fashion Week
- Military beret
- Minaudière
- Miner's apron
- Miner's cap
- Miner's habit
- Ming official headwear
- Mining helmet
- Miniskirt
- Miniver
- Mink
- Mirrored sunglasses
- Misanga
- Mitre
- Mitznefet (Israeli military)
- Mixed martial arts clothing
- Mob cap
- Mobile phone charm
- Moccasin
- Mockado
- Mod (subculture)
- Modacrylic
- Modern dress
- Modern girl
- Modern Irish Army uniform
- Modius (headdress)
- Mohair
- Mohra (necklace)
- Moire (fabric)
- Mojari
- Mohawk hairstyle
- Moleskin
- Money bag
- Money belt
- Money clip
- Monk's cloth
- Monk shoe
- Monkey jacket
- Monmouth cap
- Monocle
- Monokini
- Montefortino helmet
- Montenegrin cap
- Montera
- Montera picona
- Moon Boot
- Mooskappe
- Mordant
- Morion (helmet)
- Morning dress
- Morocco leather
- Morphsuits
- Mother Hubbard dress
- Motley
- Motorcycle boot
- Motoring hood
- Mountaineering boot
- Mounteere Cap
- Mourning
- Muff (handwarmer)
- Mufti (dress)
- Mukluk
- Mule (footwear)
- Mullet (haircut)
- Multi-Terrain Pattern
- Mundu
- Mundum Neriyathum
- Muscadin
- Mushanana
- Muslin
- Muu-muu
- Myeonbok
- Myeonje baegab
- Mysore Peta

== N ==
- Nabedrennik
- Naga shawl
- Nainsook
- Nakshi kantha
- Namaksin
- Namba (clothing)
- Nambawi
- Nankeen
- Nanofiber
- Nantucket Reds
- Nap (textile)
- Napa leather
- Nasal helmet
- National costumes of Poland
- Nationella dräkten
- Native American jewelry
- Natural dye
- Naturism
- Natural fiber
- Nazi chic
- NBA dress code
- Neck corset
- Neck gaiter
- Neck ring
- Neckerchief
- Necklace
- Neckline
- Necktie
- Neckwear
- Needlepoint
- Negligee
- Nehru jacket
- Neiman Marcus Fashion Award
- Nemes
- Neoprene
- Net (textile)
- Netela
- Nettement Chic
- New bespoke movement
- New Year's glasses
- New York Fashion Week
- Newsboy cap
- Nightcap (garment)
- Nightgown
- Nightshirt
- Ninon
- Niqāb
- Niqāb in Egypt
- Noil
- Nón quai thao
- Nonwoven fabric
- Norigae
- Norfolk jacket
- Nose-jewel
- Nose piercing
- Nosegay
- Nubuck
- Nurse uniform
- Nurse's cap
- Nursing bra
- Nylon

== O ==
- Obi (martial arts)
- Obi (sash)
- Obi-ita
- Ochipok
- Ohaguro
- Oilskin
- Olefin fiber
- Omega chain
- Omophor
- One-piece swimsuit
- Onesie (jumpsuit)
- Onnara
- Opanak
- Open-crotch pants
- Open drawers
- Opera coat
- Opinga
- Orarion
- Orenburg shawl
- Organ shoes
- Organdy
- Organic clothing
- Organic cotton
- Organza
- Ostrich leather
- Ottoman (textile)
- Ottoman clothing
- Outerwear
- Oven glove
- Over-the-knee boot
- Overall
- Overcoat
- Overfrock
- Overskirt
- Oxford (cloth)
- Oxford bags
- Oxford shoe

== P ==
- Paambadam
- Paduasoy
- Paduka
- Paenula
- Pageboy
- Pahlavi hat
- Pagri (turban)
- Paisley (design)
- Paithani
- Pajamas
- Pakistani clothing
- Pakol
- Palazzo trousers
- Palestinian costumes
- Palla (garment)
- Pallium
- Paludamentum
- Pampootie
- Panama hat
- Pangi (Maroon)
- Panling Lanshan
- Pannier (clothing)
- Pantalettes
- Panties
- Pants
- Pantsuit
- Panty line
- Pantyhose
- Pantyhose for men
- Papakhi
- Papal fanon
- Papal shoes
- Papal Slippers
- Papal tiara
- Paper clothing
- Papoose
- Parachute pants
- Paranja
- Pareo
- Paris Fashion Week
- Party dress
- Party hat
- Parure
- Pas kontuszowy (sash)
- Pasapali Sari
- Pashmina
- Pashtun dress
- Pasiking
- Passementerie
- Pasties
- Patchwork
- Patent leather
- Patiala salwar
- Patrol cap
- Patten (shoe)
- Pattern grading
- Pattern (sewing)
- Pattu pavadai
- Pea coat
- Peaked cap
- Pectoral (Ancient Egypt)
- Pectoral cross
- Pedal pushers
- Peep-toe shoe
- Peineta (comb)
- Pelisse
- Pelvic protector
- Pencil skirt
- Pencil suit
- Pendilia
- Peplos
- Peplum
- Peplum jacket
- Perak (headdress)
- Peranakan beaded slippers
- Percale
- Persian clothing
- Persian embroidery
- Persian weave
- Personal Clothing System
- Personal protective equipment
- Peshawari chappal
- Petasos
- Peter Pan collar
- Petersham ribbon
- Petite size
- Petticoat
- Petticoat breeches
- Pettipants
- Phat pants
- Phelonion
- Pheta (turban)
- Phoenix crown
- Phra Kiao
- Phrygian cap
- Phrygian type helmet
- Phulkari
- Physical training uniform
- Piccadill
- Picot
- Pien Fu
- Pigtail
- Pile (textile)
- Pile weave
- Pileus (hat)
- Pilgrim's hat
- Pill (textile)
- Pillbox hat
- Pima cotton
- Pin-back button
- Pin stripes
- Piña
- Pinafore
- Pince-nez
- Pinking shears
- Piping (sewing)
- Piqué (weaving)
- Pith helmet
- Pixie cut
- Placket
- Plague doctor costume
- Plaid (pattern)
- Plain dress
- Plain weave
- Plastic clothing
- Plastic pants
- Plate armour
- Platform boot
- Platform shoe
- Playsuit (children's clothing)
- Playsuit (lingerie)
- Pleat
- Pledge pin
- Plimsoll shoe
- Plus fours
- Plus-size clothing
- Plush
- Po (clothing)
- Pocket
- Pocket protector
- Pocket watch
- Podvorotnichok
- Poet shirt
- Point de Venise
- Pointe shoe
- Pointed hat
- Pointed shoe
- Pointinini
- Poke bonnet
- Polar fleece
- Police duty belt
- Police uniforms and equipment in the United Kingdom
- Political t-shirt
- Political uniform
- Polka dot
- Pollera
- Polo neck
- Polo shirt
- Polonaise (clothing)
- Polos
- Polyester
- Polypropylene
- Pom-pom
- Pompadour (hairstyle)
- Poncho
- Pongee
- Pontifical vestments
- Ponytail
- Poodle skirt
- Poplin
- Pork pie hat
- Portmanteau (luggage)
- Possum-skin cloak
- POW bracelet
- Power dressing
- Prairie skirt
- Pram suit
- Pratt knot
- Prayer shawl
- Preppy
- Presidential sash
- Priestly robe (Judaism)
- Priestly sash
- Priestly tunic
- Priestly turban
- Priestly undergarments
- Prince Albert piercing
- Princess seams
- Printed T-shirt
- Printer's hat
- Prison uniform
- Privilège du blanc
- Provence
- Pteruges
- Pudding hat
- Puletasi
- Puneri Pagadi
- Pungcha
- Purdah
- Purse
- Purse hook
- Puttee

== Q ==
- Qeleshe
- Qing official headwear
- Quadrille dress
- Queue (hairstyle)
- Quiff
- Quilting
- Quoit (brooch)

== R ==
- Rabbit hair
- Raccoon coat
- Racing flat
- Raffia palm
- Raglan sleeve
- Rah-rah skirt
- Rain pants
- Raincoat
- Raj pattern
- Rajshahi silk
- Rakusu
- Rally cap
- Ramie
- Randoseru
- Rash guard
- Rastacap
- Rationale (clothing)
- Rawhide (textile)
- Rayadillo
- Rayon
- Ready-to-wear
- Rebozo
- Recycling
- Red beret
- Red carpet fashion
- Red coat (British army)
- Red Sea rig
- Redingote
- Redresseur corset
- Reimiro
- Rekel
- Religious attire
- Religious clothing
- Religious habit
- Resist dyeing
- Resort wear
- Reticella
- Revers
- Reversible garment
- Rhinegraves
- Rhinestone
- Ribbing (knitting)
- Ribbon
- Ribbon work
- Rickrack
- Riding boot
- Riding habit
- Riding Mac Fashion
- Rigger boot
- Right to clothing
- Riha (garment)
- Rimless eyeglasses
- Ring (jewellery)
- Ring size
- Ringer T-shirt
- Ringlet (haircut)
- Ripstop
- Roach (headdress)
- Robe
- Robe de style
- Rochet
- Rocker bottom shoe
- Rogatywka
- Roller printing on textiles
- Roller shoes
- Roller skate
- Romanian dress
- Romper suit
- Rondel (armour)
- Rosemount Ski Boots
- Royal Air Force uniform
- Royal Navy uniform
- Ruby slippers
- Ruana
- Rubber glove
- Rubber pants
- Ruff (clothing)
- Ruffle (sewing)
- Rugby shirt
- Rugby shorts
- Rugby socks
- Rumāl
- Running shorts
- Ruqun
- Russian boot

== S ==
- Sabaton
- Sable
- Sabot (shoe)
- Sabretache
- Sack-back gown
- Saddle shoe
- Saekdongot
- Safari jacket
- Safari suit
- Sagging (fashion)
- Sagum
- Sagyusam
- Sailcloth
- Sailor cap
- Sailor suit
- Šajkača
- Sakkos
- Salako
- Salakot
- Sallet
- Saltwater sandals
- Sam Browne belt
- Sambalpuri saree
- Samite
- Sampot
- Sampot Samloy
- Samue
- Sanbenito
- Sandal
- Sanforization
- Sangu (armour)
- Sans-culottes
- Santa suit
- Sarafan
- Saran (plastic)
- Sari
- Sarong
- Sarpech
- Sash
- Satchel (bag)
- Sateen
- Satin
- Satin weave
- Satlada
- Sauna suit
- Savile Row
- Sbai
- Scapular
- Scarf
- School uniform
- School uniforms in England
- School uniforms in Sri Lanka
- Scissors-glasses
- Scoop neck
- Scrambled egg (uniform)
- Screen printing
- Scrimmage vest
- Scrubs (clothing)
- Scrum cap
- Scrunchie
- Sea silk
- Seaboot
- See-through clothing
- Seersucker
- Sehra
- Selburose
- Self-fabric
- Selvage
- Semi-formal
- Senegalese kaftan
- Senninbari
- Sennit
- Senufo Bird
- Sequin
- Serape
- Serbian national costume
- Serge
- Sericin
- Set-saree
- Setesdalsbunad
- Sgian-dubh
- Shadbelly
- Shagreen
- Shahmina
- Shahtoosh
- Shako
- Shalwar kameez
- Shalu (sari)
- Shahmina
- Shank (footwear)
- Sharkskin
- Sharovary
- Shawl
- Shearling
- Shearling coat
- Sheath dress
- Sheepskin
- Sheepskin boots
- Sheer fabric
- Sheitel
- Shell cordovan
- Shell gorget
- Shell jacket
- Shell stitch
- Shendyt
- Shenyi
- Sherwani
- Shetland wool
- Shingle bob
- Shinobi shōzoku
- Shirizaya
- Shirring
- Shirt
- Shirt stays
- Shirt stud
- Shirtdress
- Shisha (embroidery)
- Shitagi
- Shmarjet
- Shoe
- Shoe buckle
- Shoe size
- Shoe tree
- Shoehorn
- Shoelace knot
- Shoelaces
- Shoemaking
- Shorts
- Shot silk
- Shoulder pads (fashion)
- Shower cap
- Shpitzel
- Shrug (clothing)
- Shtreimel
- Shutter Shades
- Shweshwe
- Šibenik cap
- Side cap
- Sign language glove
- Sikh chola
- Silambu
- Silhouette
- Silk
- Simar
- Sindhi cap
- Single-breasted
- Sirwal
- Sisal
- Size zero
- Skate shoes
- Skeleton suit
- Ski boot
- Ski helmet
- Ski suit
- Skirt
- Skort
- Skufia
- Slap bracelet
- Sleeve
- Sleeve garter
- Sleeved blanket
- Sleeveless shirt
- Slide (footwear)
- Slim-fit pants
- Sling bag
- Slingback
- Slip (clothing)
- Slip-on shoe
- Slipper
- Slouch hat
- Slouch socks
- Small knot
- Smart casual
- Smock-frock
- Smock Parachutist DPM
- Smocking
- Smoking cap
- Smoking jacket
- Snap fastener
- Snapback (hat)
- Sneakers
- Sneaker collecting
- Snood (headgear)
- Snow boot
- Snowmobile suit
- Snowshoe
- Social impact of thong underwear
- Sock
- Sokutai
- Sombrero
- Sombrero calañés
- Sombrero cordobés
- Sombrero de catite
- Sombrero Vueltiao
- Sonepuri Sari
- Song official headwear
- Songket
- Songkok
- Soutache
- South American fashion
- Spaghetti strap
- Spandex
- Spangenhelm
- Spanish breeches
- Spats (footwear)
- Spectator shoe
- Speedsuit
- Spencer (clothing)
- Spinning (textiles)
- Splittermuster
- Spodik
- Spool heel
- Spoon busk
- Sporran
- Sport coat
- Sports bra
- Sports visor
- Sportswear (activewear)
- Sportswear (fashion)
- Sprang
- Spur
- Square academic cap
- Square leg suit
- Stab vest
- Starter jacket
- Station wear
- Steek
- Steel-toe boot
- Stetson
- Sticharion
- Stiletto heel
- Stirrup pants
- Stock tie
- Stocking
- Stola
- Stole (shawl)
- Stole (vestment)
- Stomacher
- Stormy Kromer cap
- Strap
- Strapless dress
- Straw
- Straw hat
- Street style
- Streetwear
- String bag
- Stripweave
- Stroller (style)
- Student boilersuit
- Student cap
- Stump sock
- Style line
- Style tribe
- Šubara
- Subligaculum
- Suea khrui
- Suede
- Suit (clothing)
- Sumptuary law
- Sun hat
- Sundress
- Sunglasses
- Supermodel
- Surcoat
- Surplice
- Surtout
- Suspenders
- Sustainable fashion
- Swaddling
- Sweater
- Sweater design
- Sweater girl
- Sweater vest
- Sweatpants
- Swedish goggles
- Swedish military uniforms
- Swim briefs
- Swim cap
- Swim diaper
- Swimsuit
- Synthesis (clothing)

== T ==
- T-bar sandal
- T-shirt
- Ta'ovala
- Tabard
- Tabi
- Tactical pants
- Taffeta
- Tagelmust
- Tailcoat
- Tainia (costume)
- Takchita
- Tallit
- Tally (cap)
- Tam o' Shanter (cap)
- Tambour lace
- Tan beret
- Tang official headwear
- Tanga (clothing)
- Tanggeon
- Tangzhuang
- Tanker boot
- Tankini
- Tantour
- Tap pants
- Tapa cloth
- Tapestry crochet
- Tapis (Philippine clothing)
- Taqiyah (cap)
- Taranga (clothing)
- Tartan
- Tassel
- Tatami (Japanese armour)
- Tatting
- Tattooing
- Tau robe
- Tea gown
- Teddy (garment)
- Tēfui
- Telnyashka
- Telogreika
- Tembel hat
- Temple garment
- Temple ring
- Temple robes
- Teneriffe lace
- Tengura
- Tent dress
- Terrycloth
- Textile printing
- Textiles and dresses of Assam
- Thaar
- Thai fisherman pants
- Thali necklace
- Thawb
- Théâtre de la Mode
- Thigh-high boots
- Third jersey
- Thong
- Thracian clothing
- Thread count
- Three quarter pants
- Throwback uniform
- Tiara
- Tichel
- Tie chain
- Tie clip
- Tie-dye
- Tie pin
- Tiger-head shoes
- Tigerstripe
- Tight trousers
- Tightlacing
- Tights
- Tignon
- Tilfi
- Tilmàtli
- Timeline of clothing and textiles technology
- Tippet
- Titovka (cap)
- Tobi trousers
- Toe cleavage
- Toe tights
- Toe socks
- Toego
- Toga
- Toile
- Tokin (headwear)
- Tønder lace
- Tonsure
- Top (clothing)
- Top hat
- Topee
- Topi (cap)
- Topi (disambiguation)
- Topor (headgear)
- Toque
- Torc
- Torchon lace
- Torsolette
- Tote bag
- Toupée
- Toupha
- Trabea
- Tracht
- Track spikes
- Tracksuit
- Trading jacket
- Traditional Albanian clothing
- Traditional dyes of the Scottish Highlands
- Traditional Welsh costume
- Train (clothing)
- Training bra
- Training corset
- Traje de flamenca
- Traje de luces
- Trapper (ice hockey)
- Trashion
- Träskor
- Tregging
- Trench boot
- Trench coat
- Tressoir
- Trews
- Tricana poveira
- Trickle-up fashion
- Tricorne
- Triglavka
- Trilby
- Trim (sewing)
- Troentorp Clogs
- Trousers
- Trucker hat
- Trunks (clothing)
- Tsarouhi
- Tsujigahana
- Tsunokakushi
- Tube top
- Tubeteika
- Tudong
- Tudor bonnet
- Tulle bi telli
- Tulle netting
- Tunic
- Tunica molesta
- Tunicle
- Tunisian crochet
- Tupenu
- Tuque
- Turban
- Turkish trousers
- Turnshoe
- Tussar
- Tuxedo
- Tweed (cloth)
- Twill
- Twinset
- Type 07
- Type 97 Service Dress
- Tyrolean hat
- Tzitzit

== U ==
- Ugg boots
- Uchi-bukuro
- UK Lingerie Awards
- Ukrainian embroidery
- Ukrainian wreath
- Ulster coat
- Ultra sheer
- Ultrasuede
- Umbrella
- Umbrella Hat
- Undergarment
- Underpants
- Undershirt
- Underwear as outerwear
- Underwire bra
- Uniform
- Uniform (gymnastics)
- Uniform beret
- Uniforms of La Grande Armée
- Uniforms of the American Civil War
- Uniforms of the Confederate States military forces
- Uniforms of the Singapore Police Force
- Union suit
- Unisex clothing
- Unit Colour Patch
- Unitard
- Updo
- Upturned collar
- US standard clothing size
- Usekh collar
- Ushanka
- Utility clothing
- Utility cover
- Uttariya
- Uwa-obi
- Uwabaki
- Uwagi

== V ==
- Valenciennes lace
- Valenki
- Vambrace
- Vanity sizing
- Vat dye
- Veil
- Veilkini
- Velcro
- Veldskoen
- Velour
- Velvet
- Velveteen
- Venetian style shoe
- Vent (tailoring)
- Vest
- Vestment
- Vibram FiveFingers
- Victorian dress reform
- Victorian fashion
- Vicuña
- Vietnamese clothing
- Virago sleeve
- Viscose
- Visor
- Vista All Terrain Pattern
- Viyella
- Vo Phuc
- Voile
- Vyshyvanka

== W ==
- Waders (footwear)
- Waxed jacket
- Waist (clothing)
- Waist cincher
- Waistcoat
- Waistline (clothing)
- Walk shorts
- Wallet
- War bonnet
- Waraji
- Wardrobe (clothing)
- Warp knitting
- Warp printing
- Warp (weaving)
- Wasp waist
- Watch
- Water polo cap
- Water shoe
- Webbed belt
- Wearable art
- Wearable technology
- Weaving
- Wedding dress
- Wedding sari
- Weft
- Weighted silk
- Wellington boot
- Welsh hat
- Welt (shoe)
- Western cosmetics in the 1970s
- Western wear
- Wetsuit
- Wetsuit boots
- Whale tail
- Whipcord
- White coat
- White tie
- Wide leg jeans
- Wig
- Wild silk
- Willy warmer
- Wimple
- Windbreaker
- Windproof smock
- Windsor knot
- Windsor uniform
- Wine country casual
- Wings (haircut)
- Winklepicker
- Woggle
- Women wearing pants
- Women's clothing in China
- Women's oversized fashion in the United States since the 1920s
- Wonju (Bhutan)
- Wonsam
- Woodblock printing on textiles
- Wool
- Wörishofer
- World War II German uniform
- Worsted
- Woven fabric
- Wrap (clothing)
- Wrap dress
- Wrapper (clothing)
- Wreath (attire)
- Wrestling shoe
- Wrestling singlet
- Wristband

== X ==
- Xhaqete

== Y ==
- Yak lace
- Yanggwan
- Yarn
- Yashmak
- Yếm
- Yoga pants
- Yoke (clothing)
- Yuanlingshan
- Yukata

== Z ==
- Zardozi
- Zari
- Zazou
- Zentai
- Zephyr (garment)
- Zephyr cloth
- Zephyrina Jupon
- Zhiduo (clothing)
- Zibellino
- Zierscheibe
- Zipper
- Zone (vestment)
- Zonnar
- Zoot suit
- Zōri
- Zoster (costume)
- Zouave
- Zouave jacket
- Zucchetto
- Żupan
- Zuria

== See also ==
- List of grands couturiers
