= Shalu =

Shalu may refer to:

== People ==
- Shalu Nigam, Indian lawyer
- Shalu Kurian, Indian actress
- Shalu Menon, Indian actress

== Places ==
- Shalu Monastery, or Ṣalu Monastery, in Shigatse, Tibet
- Shalu District, district in Taichung, Taiwan
- Shalu railway station, railway station of Taiwan Railways Administration

== Other uses ==
- Shalu (sari), regional variant of the sari from Banaras (Varanasi), India
- Shalu Robot, Indian humanoid robot made from waste
