= Zephyrina Jupon =

Type of structured petticoat

A Zephyrina Jupon is a modified crinoline in the form of a metal frame with an open front. It gradually widens in circumference towards the feet. It is straight from the waist down at the front, but the train widens out at the back. They were popular during the mid-Victorian era (1857–77) Messrs. Thomson and Co. are the inventors and manufacturers of the pattern, along with "the glove-fitting corset".
