= School uniforms in Sri Lanka =

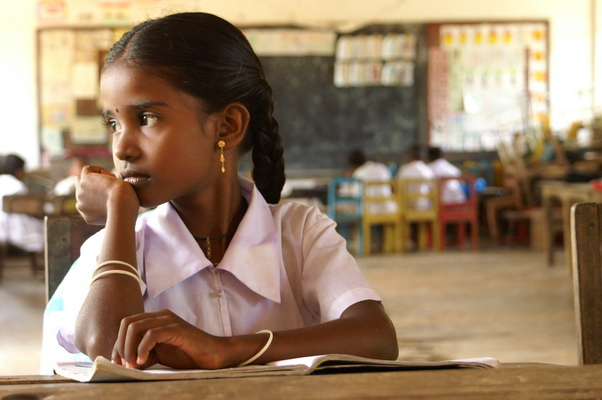
School girl

School uniforms in Sri Lanka were first introduced in the late 19th century. Today, school uniforms are almost universal in the Sri Lankan public and private school systems. All public and private schools maintains almost a singular uniform design in the color of white with few individual characteristics for boys and a few variation designs in white for girls.

== Usage ==
Introduced during the British rule the school uniforms has changed very little over the decades. In recent decades it has been a practice of the government to issue free uniform material to students annually, which is useful for poor children.

In public and private schools boys from grade 10 (age 15 years) wear white short sleeve shirts with white trousers. While boys of grade 9 and below wear either blue or white shorts, however blue is more common with white reserved for special occasions or junior prefects. They wear black shoes and black or white socks. On formal occasions depending on school traditions boys may wear white long sleeved shirts with their school tie (denoting school flag colors) and suit jacket. Use of jackets vary from school to school with students of most old schools wearing white suit jacket in line with the tropical dress code. Sportsmen of these schools may wear dark blue suit jackets and coloursmen wearing a uniform of design unique to the school he belongs too. However unique features are maintained by prominent single sex schools, which may include badges or insignia.

Girls uniforms may differ slightly from school to school, and religious affiliation of students. They wear black or white shoes and white socks. However all uniforms are white, and some may include a tie. For formal occasions depending on school traditions suit jackets of different colours are warn by female students.

Since the start of international schools in the 1980s, uniforms of different colour and design have been adapted by these schools.

== Cultural significance ==
Various schools are known for their particular uniforms. Uniforms can have a nostalgic characteristic for former students, and is often associated with relatively carefree youth. Uniforms are rarely modified by students as a means of exhibiting individualism, since high discipline standards are maintained by prominent schools with reference to uniforms.

== See also ==
- Education in Sri Lanka
