= Chemise cagoule =

Type of nightshirt

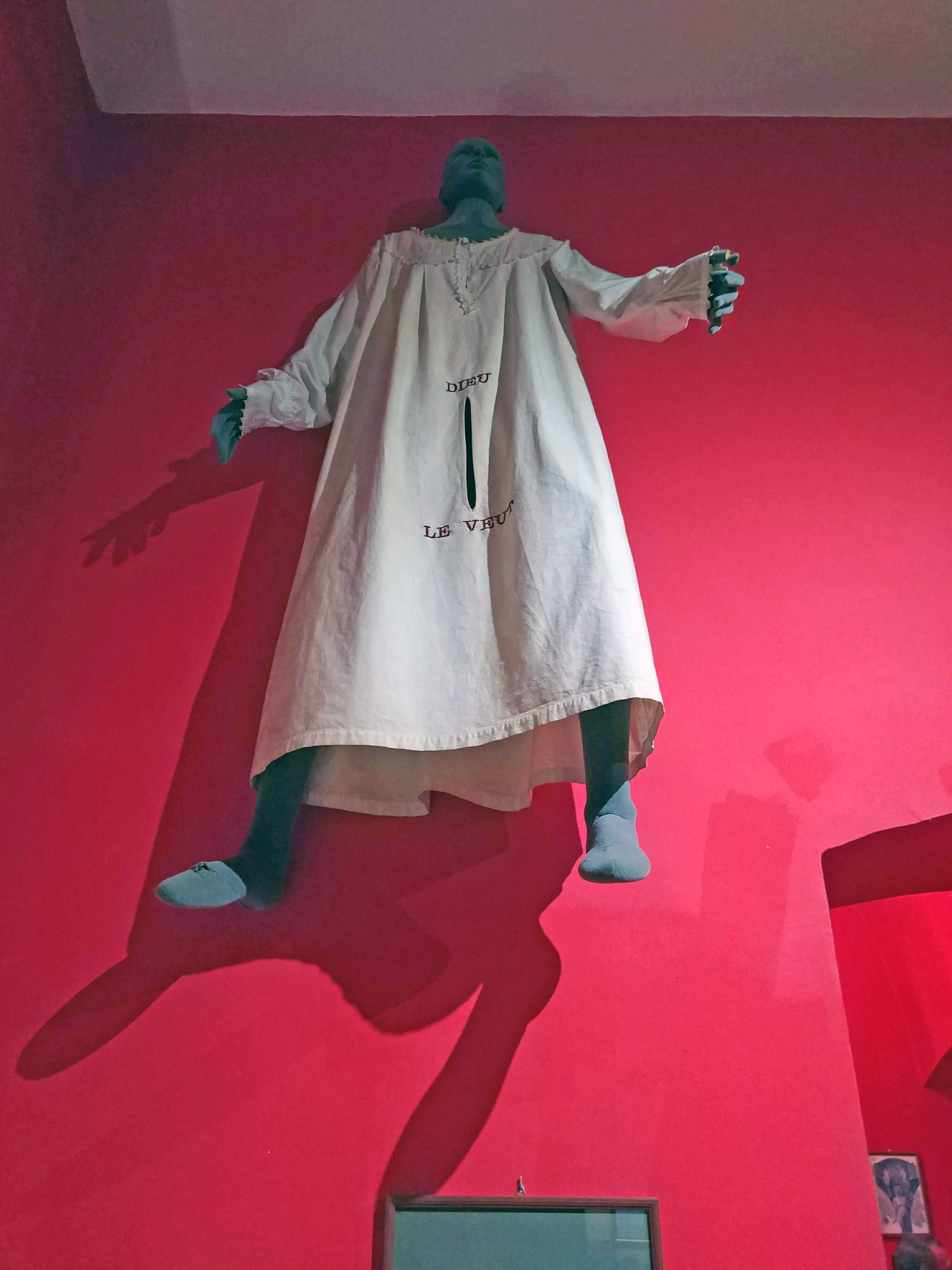
Chemise cagoule in Sex Machines Museum, Prague

A chemise cagoule (French: [ʃəmiz kaɡul], "cowl shirt") was a heavy nightshirt worn by pious Catholic men and women during the Middle Ages in order to permit a husband to impregnate his wife without having to endure any unnecessary physical contact with her. The chemise cagoule covered all sexual areas, but left an opening for necessary contact. Pious couples were expected to use chemise cagoules at every lovemaking session, and thus would never see each other naked.

A similar concept was allegedly employed in one or more unspecified Native American cultures as the "chastity blanket", an item of similar design held by tribal elders until requested for use by a man, according to anthropologist Gordon Rattray Taylor.
