= Kiondo =

Kenyan handwoven bag made from twine

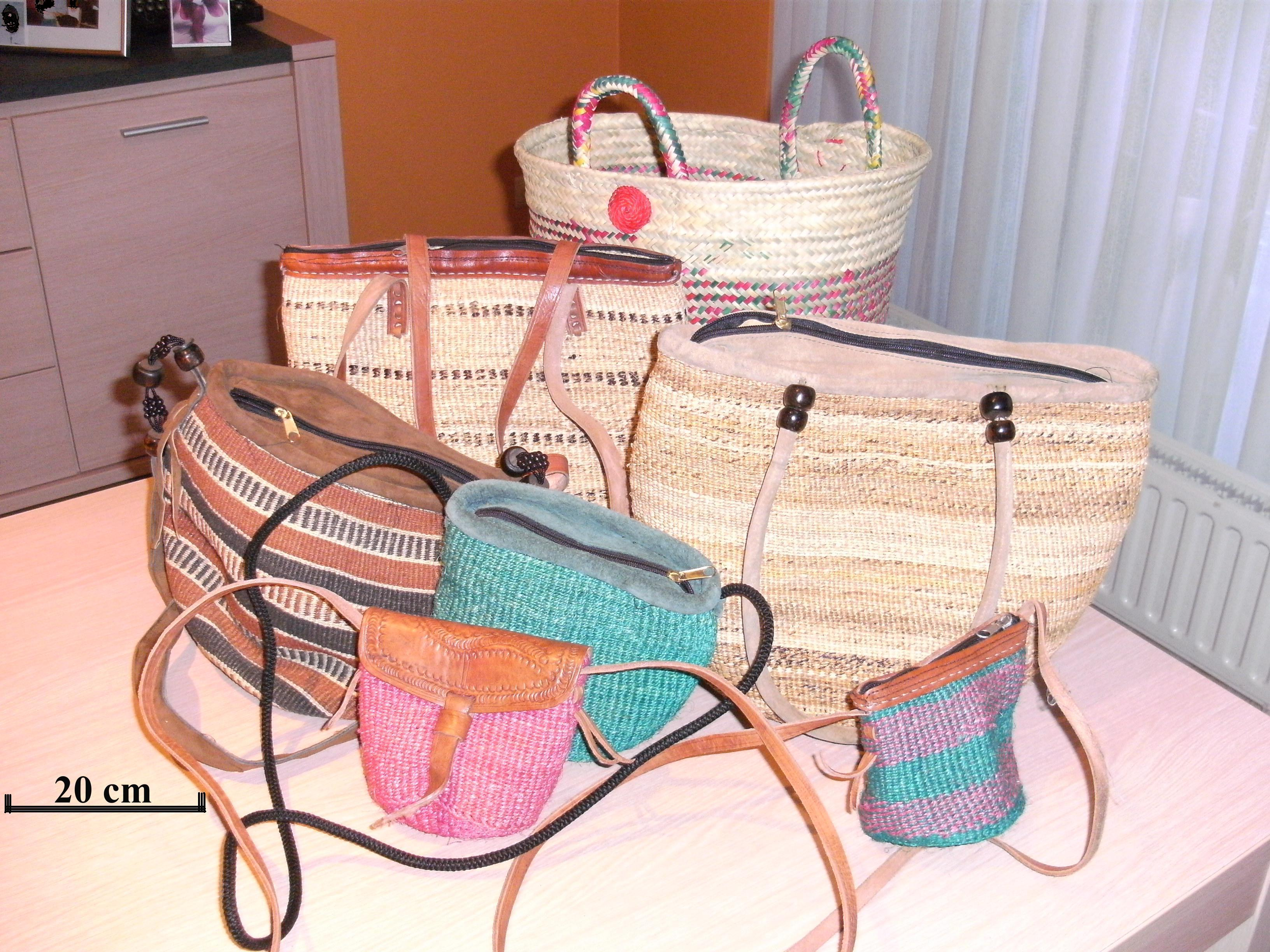
Several kiondos with an okapo in the background

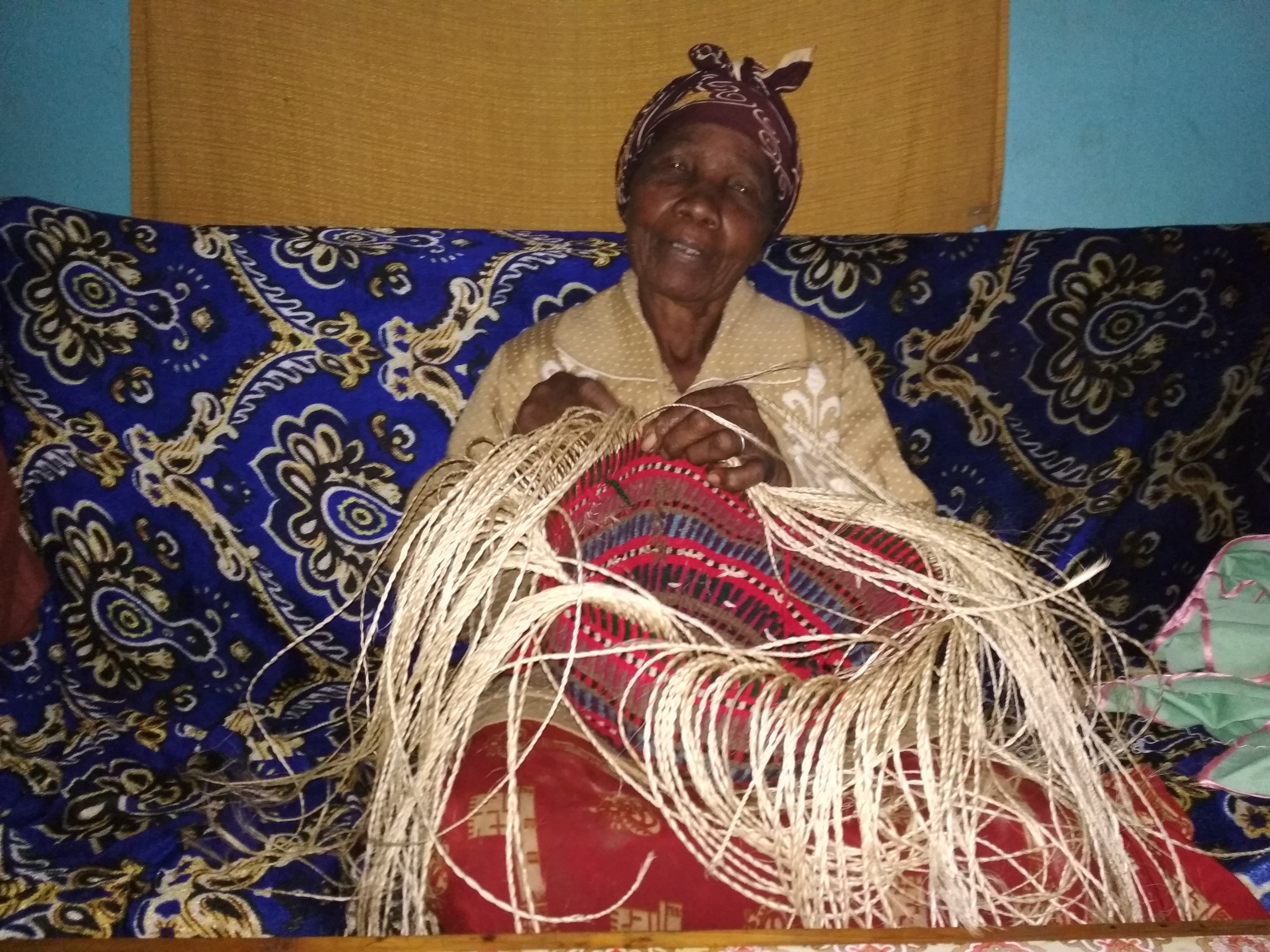
Old woman of Kenya weaving a kiondo

A kiondo is a handwoven bag made from indigenous vegetable twine with leather trimmings. It is indigenous to the Taita, Kikuyu and Kamba tribes of Kenya.

The Swahili word for a kiondoo is 'chondo,' plural 'vyondo'.
