= Grotulja =

Traditional necklace of walnuts from Croatia

Grotulja is a sort of necklace made out of walnuts lined on string. Grotulja is a symbol of area around Trilj town in Croatia. Traditionally it was given by a young man to a girl on a feast of Saint Michael (patron saint of Trilj) as a symbol of affection or even as symbol of marriage proposal.
