= Hongreline =

The hongreline was a mid-thigh-length surtout or overcoat of the frock style, usually trimmed and/or lined with fur developed and popularized during the mid-17th century. Brought from Germany, the hongreline was popular in France during the reign of Louis XIII. The hongreline was worn both by military and civilians. At the end of the reign, a variation on the hongreline developed in the military; a sort of front-buttoned coat with a split in the rear near the hips.

== Related links ==
- Musketeer
- Doublet
- Cassock (note: see "Non-Clerical Sixteenth Century Jacket" at bottom of page)
- Rochet
- 1600–1650 in fashion
- Musée Historique de Lorrain (note: in French, but includes a picture)
