= Fashion matrix =

Fashion term

A fashion matrix or "Colour-Size Matrix" refers to the means whereby fashion, footwear and apparel retailers track product variants in a grid format. These retailers manage their product variants by creating a multiple dimension grid aligning the colours of a line of stock against the sizes.

For instance, a jeansmaker might sell a line of their product, Reptile. In a table on the x-axis might be sizes of the product, whilst on the y-axis would be colours, thus creating the so-called 'matrix'. These dimensions can be further sub-divided to create a multiple-dimension matrix (for instance, to include different cuts of jeans, types of denim, etc.)

Modern IT retail systems take one of two alternative approaches to the provision of a fashion matrix. Specialist size/colour systems define a product at two levels; a parent/children relationship of a) the product summary and within that b) a size/colour variants matrix. More generalised stock management systems (i.e. not specifically written for clothing and footwear) define a product on one level only, and so every size/colour (often referred to as a “variant”) is effectively a separate product in its own right and is generally presented as part of a list of single products (each of which is a separate size/colour).

Single level, generalised, stock/inventory systems may provide a mechanism which allows the user to streamline the creation of multiple size/colour variants for a product via a single action within a single interface. Thereafter most generalized systems normally track and present each size and colour as a completely separate product. Some generalized systems may also provide reports and/or screen displays which in some places in the system allow the user to pull the normally separate size/colour products together into a single overall summary per product, or even into a product matrix display.

The more specialists, approach is built around a single product (i.e. a parent) that has multiple child records (i.e. the individual size/colour variants). Products are always a collection of variants; conversely, except for some very specialist reports, variants always exist as part of an overall product. As a consequence, throughout a specialist system products can consistently be viewed either at the summary parent level (i.e. incorporating all size/colour variants) or as a matrix display. Ultimately, the extent to which this duality exists throughout the system (size/colour lists verses product summaries and matrixes) determines the extent to which the system is either generalist or specialist clothing/footwear system.

The implications for stock/inventory management of the two approaches can be profound. Where little or no duality exists, and so each variant is a separate product, users (at both the head-office and tills) will often be presented with extensive lists of style, size, colour variants which are not optimised to provide either overall product summaries or matrix displays for easier assessment of stock, sales, orders etc. Consequently, it can be onerous and error prone to assess the performance of the style overall (e.g. for markdowns, sell through etc.), or to compare styles to each other. Generally speaking a matrix will be far faster for entering stock by size and colour as well as assessing variants (i.e. sizes/colours) for re-order and transfer purposes. Likewise, at the point of sale, if only extensive size/colour lists are presented in order to identify a missing barcode or for stock lookup purposes, then this can be time consuming and subject to a high level of human error, which then leads to inaccurate stock and sales data.

More sophisticated modern retail management systems include this functionality natively within the software, and allow variant tracking.
