= Mohra (necklace) =

A mohra is a necklace made of gold coins worn by the bride at a Sikh wedding. The mohra is given to the groom by the bride's father, who places it around the bride's neck after the wedding ceremony.
