= Rain pants =

Waterproof or water-resistant pants

Rain pants, also called rain trousers, are waterproof or water-resistant pants worn to protect the body from rain. Rain pants may be combined with a rain jacket to make a rain suit. Rain gaiters may also be used for further protection.

While rain pants can be made of plastic or coated nylon, modern waterproof materials are commonly used, including waterproof-breathable fabric such as Gore-Tex.

== See also ==
- Hiking equipment
