= Tengura =

Necklace commonly found in the far western end of Nepal

The tengura, or tingri necklace commonly found in the far western end of Nepal, features a repetitive motif of tiny phallus-like pieces of bone set in white metal bezels that are strung together to form a unique necklace. These necklaces are believed to keep evil spirits from rising to the head and are worn both by children and adult women.
