= Araimudi =

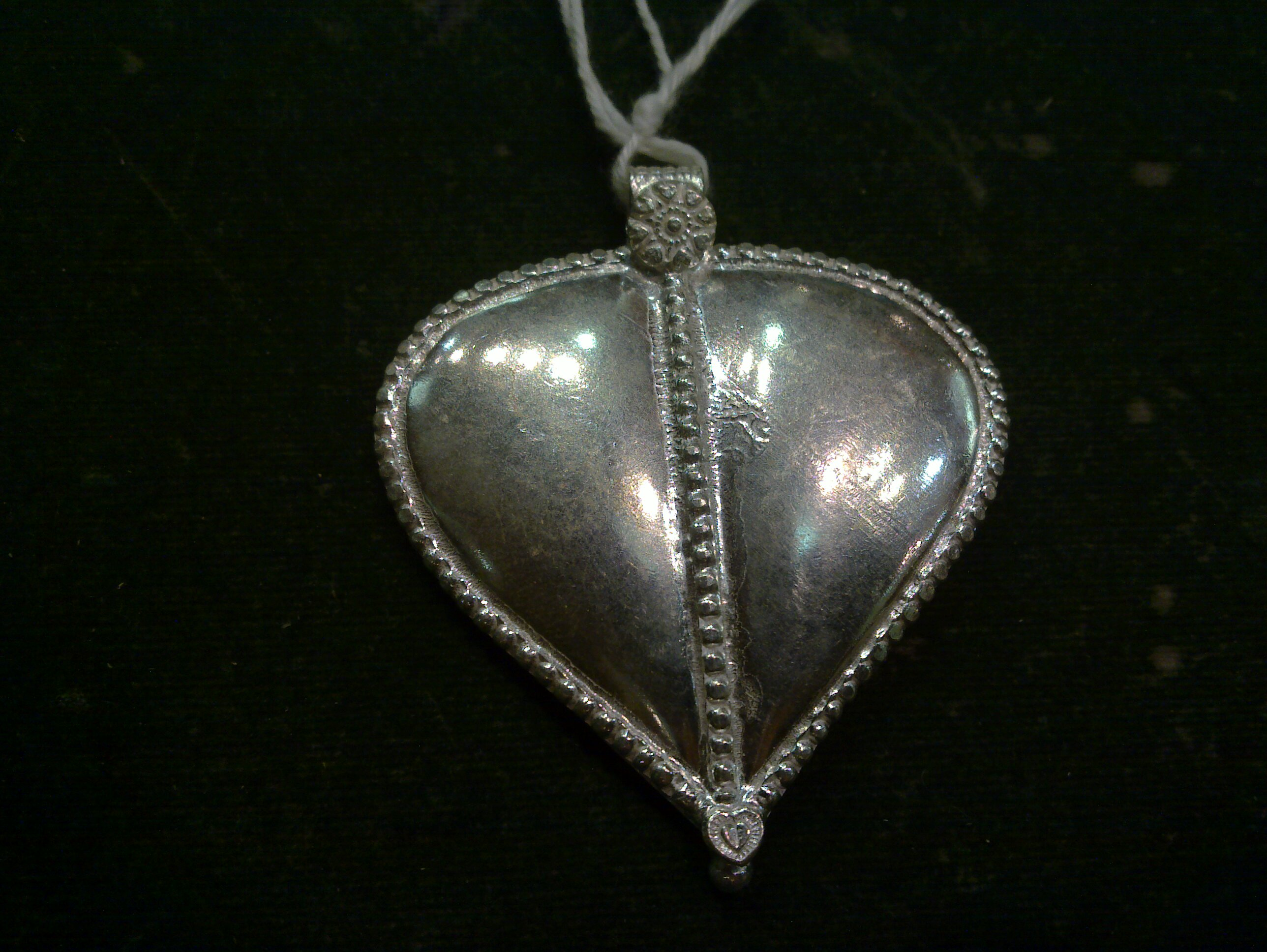
The Araimudi (araimuti) is worn by adolescent Tamil girls.

The Araimudi (araimuti) (Tamil: அரைமுடி, araimūḍi) is a small silver metal plate shaped like a heart or a fig leaf formerly worn by young girls in Tamil Nadu, India. "Arai" means loin and "mudi" means cover. It called as 'Alamadi' and 'arasilai' by Muslims of eastern Sri Lanka.

The araimudi is also known as the "Genital shield" and an araimudi was mentioned in the "Guide to the principal exhibits in the Government Museum, Pudukkottai", by M. S. Chandrasekhar, published in 1966 as being displayed in an exhibit in the Madras Government Museum.

"A Manual of the Salem district in the presidency of Madras, Volume 1" said "The children sometimes, to the age of ten years or more, go in a state of nudity, relieved perhaps by a piece of string round the waist which sustains the "araimudi" or heart-shaped piece of silver, which calls attention to what it purports to conceal."

The "Madras district gazetteers, Volume 1, Part 1" said 'Little girls, up to the age of about 3, wear nothing but the little heart-shaped piece of silver suspended by a waist-cord (arai- mudi) " which calls attention to what it purports to conceal."'

"Percival's Tamil-English dictionary", edited by P. Percival defined Araimudi as "அரைமுடி arai múḍi, A small plate of gold or silver, appended to the girdle of female children, for the sake of decency".

Miron Winslow's dictionary, "A comprehensive Tamil and English Dictionary of High and Low Tamil" defined araimudi as "அரைமுடி, s. A small plate of metal worn by little girls over the private parts."

Abbe Dubois's book "Hindu manners, customs and ceremonies", translated from French and edited by Henry Beauchamp stated that "Even the private parts of the children have their own particular decorations. Little girls wear a gold or silver shield or codpiece on which is graven some indecent picture; while a boy's ornament, also of gold or silver, is an exact copy of that member which it is meant to decorate." "Description of the character, manners, and customs of the people of India; and their institutions, religious and civil", also written by Dubois said "The children of either sex are likewise ornamented with various trinkets of the same form, though smaller than those of grown persons. They have also some that are peculiar. As all children in India go perfectly naked till they are six or seven years old, the parents of course, adapt the ornaments to the natural parts of the body. Thus, the girls have a plate of metal suspended so as to conceal, in some measure, their nakedness. The boys, on the other hand, have little bells hung round them, or some similar device of silver or gold, attached to the little belt with which they are girt. Amongst the rest, a particular trinket appears in front, bearing a resemblance to the sexual part of the lad."

Until the 1960s in the Ampara District of Sri Lanka girls wore the Araimudi.
