= Tressoir =

Embroidered silk braid

A tressoir is a braid made of golden silk embroidered with metal and gems. It was worn by women in the 12th century.
