= Treggings =

Treggings are leggings styled to look like trousers. Much like jeggings, treggings is a portmanteau of trousers and leggings.

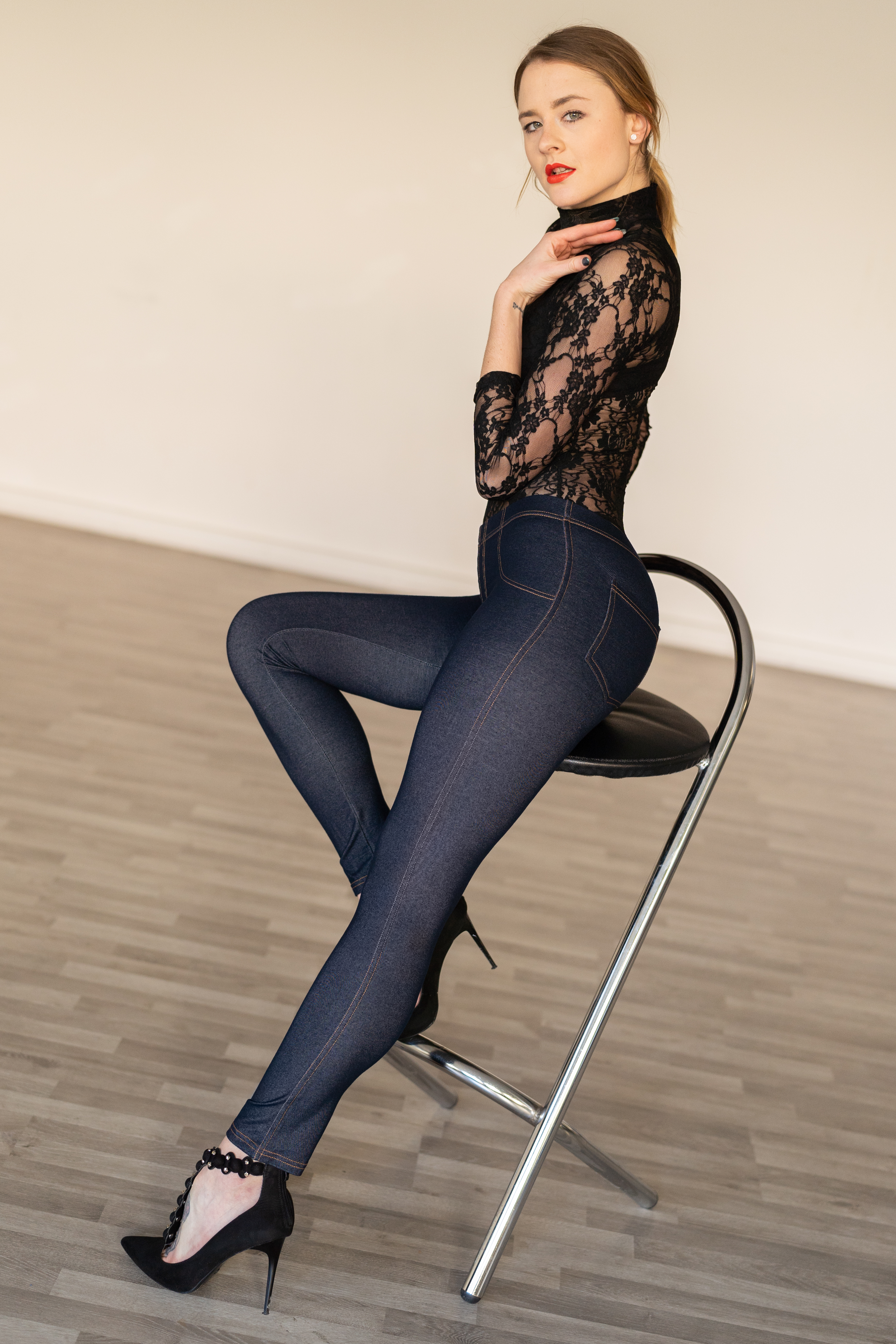
Treggings worn over a lace bodysuit with thong back and a bra underneath

Treggings fit just like leggings, but are made out of a thicker fabric.

== Controversy ==
There has been some controversy about whether they can be considered trousers. A British school decided to send 60 students showing up in treggings home on the reason that the clothing was too tight to be worn as trousers.

== Fashion ==
The tregging is very popular among young women as an alternative to stockings or trousers. They can be worn under a skirt or as a trouser. Balmain included the tregging in their fall/winter 2009 collection.
