= Uwa-obi =

Japanese sash worn by samurai

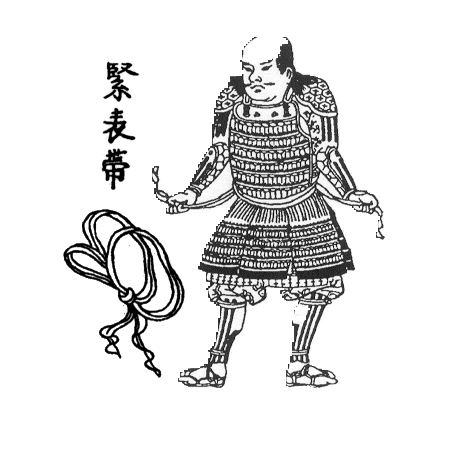
Japanese Edo period woodblock print of a samurai wearing an uwa-obi

Uwa-obi (上帯) a type of belt/sash that was worn by the samurai class and their retainers in feudal Japan. The uwa-obi was used to attach the sageo (saya cord) of the sword or swords worn by a samurai in order to secure it, other weapons and equipment would be tied to the uwa-obi as well. The uwa-obi was made from linen and cloth made of cotton, it would be wound two to three times around the body when worn. When the uwa-obi was worn with the attire or armour of the samurai, it would first be folded in two, then twisted and then a piece of leather was placed within the centre. This method was used to find the middle of the uwa-obi in a dark area. When putting on the uwa-obi, it was worn with the center in the front of the Dou (dō) (chest armour), then the two ends would be wound around the waist area and back to the front, the uwa-obi would be tied in front rather firmly with the hanamusubi knot.
