= Camisa blouse =

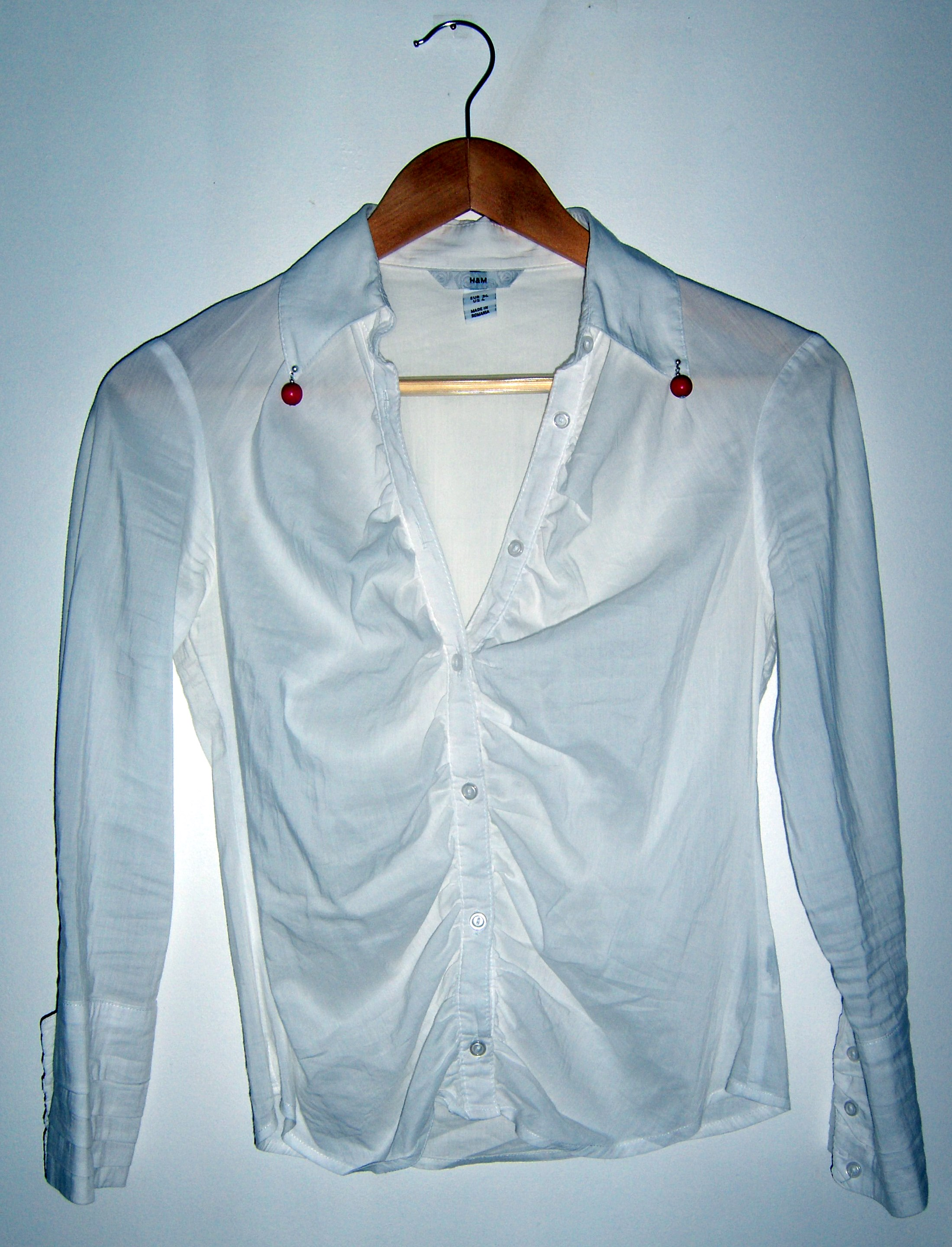
A camisa blouse

The camisa blouse is a garment that originated in the Philippines. It is made from a cloth that has been woven using thread made from the pineapple plant. The thread is known as piña thread. Clothing and accessories, like shawls, were made out of piña. These began to be woven in the Philippines in the 16th century, and are still being made today. THE TEXTILE MUSEUM says that "The pineapple plant is not a native species to the Philippines it is thought to have been introduced by the Spanish". Because the cloth took a very long time to make, it was highly sought after and wearing a camisa blouse was seen as a sign of wealth.

By the 1850s, the sleeves of the carmisa blouse, which were made out of the embroidered piña thread became larger and tubular in shape.
