= Hadagi =

Shirt of samurai

Hadagi is a type of Japanese shirt attire employed by the samurai class mainly during the Sengoku period (16th century) of Japan. The Hadagi is generally the same as a normal juban (shirt), measuring around two to four sun in length. Hadagi are made of either linen, silk crepe, or cotton cloth. Because Hadagi are only worn in cold climates, lined Hadagi are preferred over a single-layer garment. The sleeves on this type of shirt are rather narrow, and are at times omitted altogether.
