= Ferreruolo =

Short, full Spanish cape with a collar worn in the 16th and 17th centuries

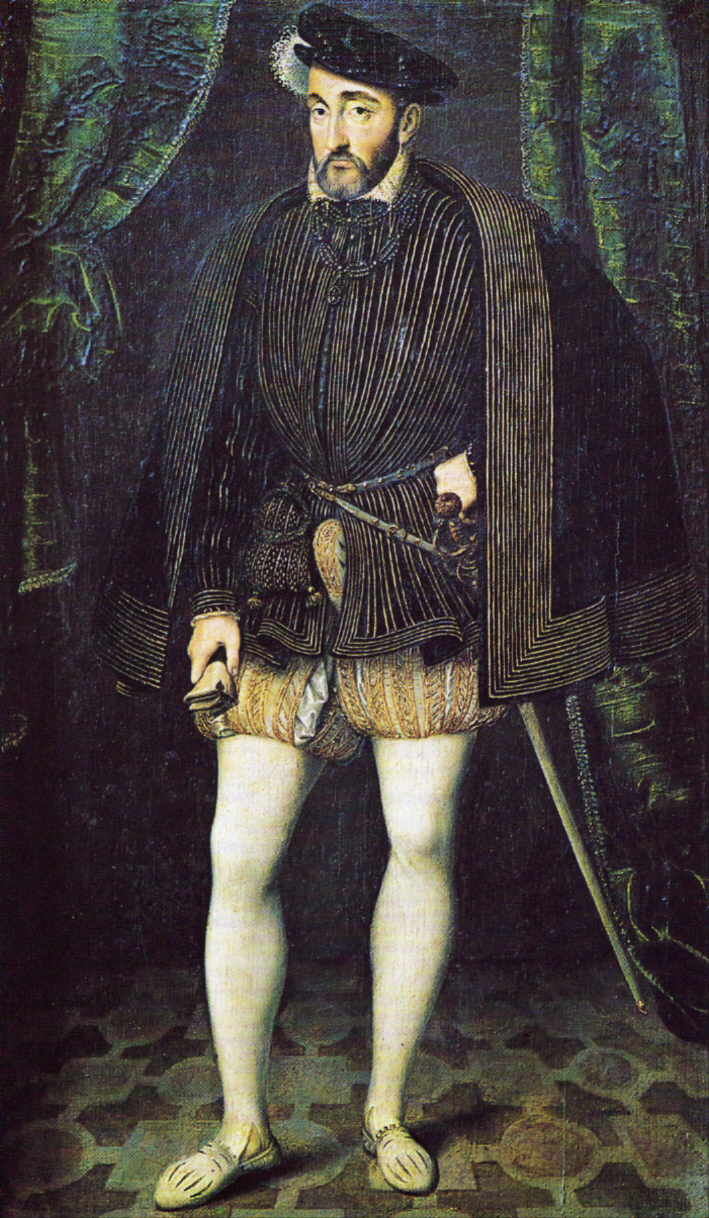
- Type: Cape
- Place of origin: Spain
- Introduced: 16th century

A ferreruolo is a short cape of military origin, which was popular among Spanish men during the 16th century. It is also called ferreruelo, herreruelo, boemio, balandran, fieltro, and capa.

The garment permitted the wearer ease of access to his sword.
