= Sombrero calañés =

Traditional hat from Calañas

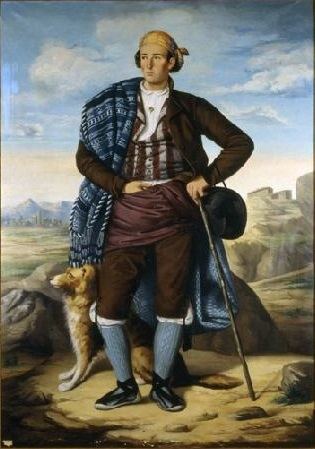
- 1861 portrait of an Aragonese man with a sombrero calañés hanging from his left arm.
- Type: Hat
- Material: Beaver hair felt
- Place of origin: Calañas (Huelva), Spain

The sombrero calañés or sombrero de Calañas is a traditional hat made in the municipality of Calañas, province of Huelva, autonomous community of Andalusia, Spain. It is also sometimes called the sombrero castoreño because it is traditionally made with felt of hair of beaver (castor) or similar animal.

The sombrero calañés has a low conical crown and a brim upturned to the point of rolling over, with a knobby ornamentation at the top of the crown and on one side of the brim. The low crown can be adjusted by a cord. The hat is worn cocked somewhat asymmetrically, and is more decorative than practical.

The term can apply to a somewhat different style of hat, more like a sombrero de catite without quite such a high conical crown, and with a sort of a small pompom dangling from a cord at the top, which falls to one side of the hat.

Either type is often worn over a kerchief tied at the nape of the neck.
