= Onnara =

Undergarment

Onnara is a traditional form of underwear for women of all ages mostly worn among Hindu women in Kerala (the southernmost state of India). Onnara is a dothi (sarong) tied in such a way that it is tight, and cannot be accidentally released.

== Specifications ==
The onnara is traditionally handwoven from cotton and features a plain white or unbleached body. A standard piece measures about six muzham (cubits) long by three muzham wide, or roughly 9 by 4.5 ft (2.7 by 1.4 m).

Unlike a standard single-layer dhoti or mundu, the onnara is pleated and wrapped tightly around the waist and lower body, staying secure without pins or a belt. The garment is typically worn beneath traditional attire like a pavada, sari, or mundu.

== Other names ==
Onnara is also called thaar in some parts of the state.
