= Nettement Chic =

Online shopping guide

Nettement Chic (English: Definitely Chic) is an online shopping guide established in January 2012 by Kate Davis Huet, a British ex-lawyer. Davis created the online boutique to address the lack of French online shopping websites. The website is based in Paris, France and offers both French and English language versions. Subscription is free.

Nettement Chic features a selection of online fashion, beauty and interior design shops, including L’Exception, my-wardrobe, Net-a-Porter and Mr Porter, Vestiaire Collective, Caratime and The Beautyst.

The site makes a themed weekly ‘Chic of the week’ selection from featured sites, as well as a ‘Look of the week’ put together by personal shopper Lara Le Joncour. It also features offers from partner websites, weekly newsletters and competitions.

According to Madame Figaro, the site is "an indispensable platform to find your way through the jungle that is the net".

In December 2012 Nettement Chic held a pop-up store on 16 rue Saint Roch in the 1st arrondissement.
