= Beonggeoji =

Korean traditional military hat

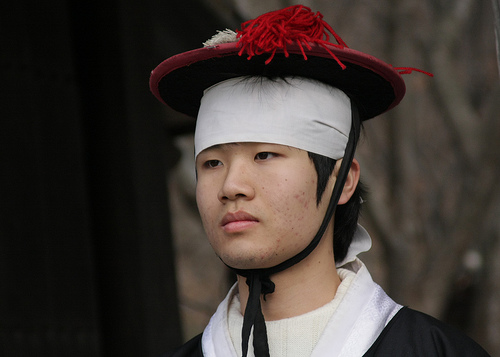

Korean name
- Hangul: 벙거지
- RR: beonggeoji
- MR: pŏnggŏji

Alternate name
- Hangul: 전립; 병립
- Hanja: 戰笠; 兵笠
- RR: jeollip; byeongnip
- MR: chŏllip; pyŏngnip

A beonggeoji (Korean: 벙거지), also known as bingli (Chinese: 兵笠), is a style of traditional Korean headgear from the Joseon period. It was worn by local magistrates, lower-ranking military officers, and servants of yangban (noblemen). It is also called jeonnip or byeongnip. It was initially worn in the northwestern region of Korea and its use eventually spread nationwide after the Imjin War (1592–1598) and the Second Manchu invasion of Korea (1636).

The Chinese version known as bingli was worn by soldiers of the Ming dynasty, derived from military hats worn during the Song and Yuan dynasties. It was banned in China after the Qing Dynasty implemented mandatory clothing and hairstyle regulations for all males (剃髮易服:Tìfàyìfú; see also Queue Order) in the first half of the seventeenth century; after approximately a decade of uneven enforcement following the harsher update to the regulations in 1645, its use fell completely out of use in China.

== Gallery ==
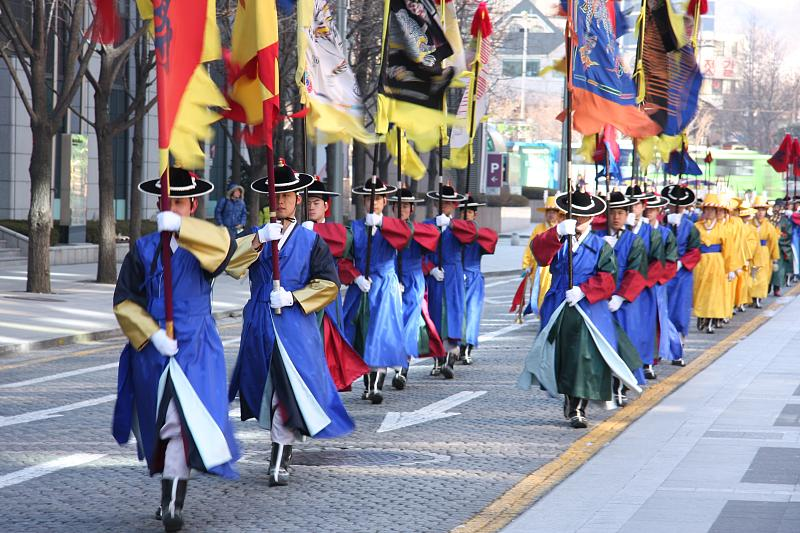

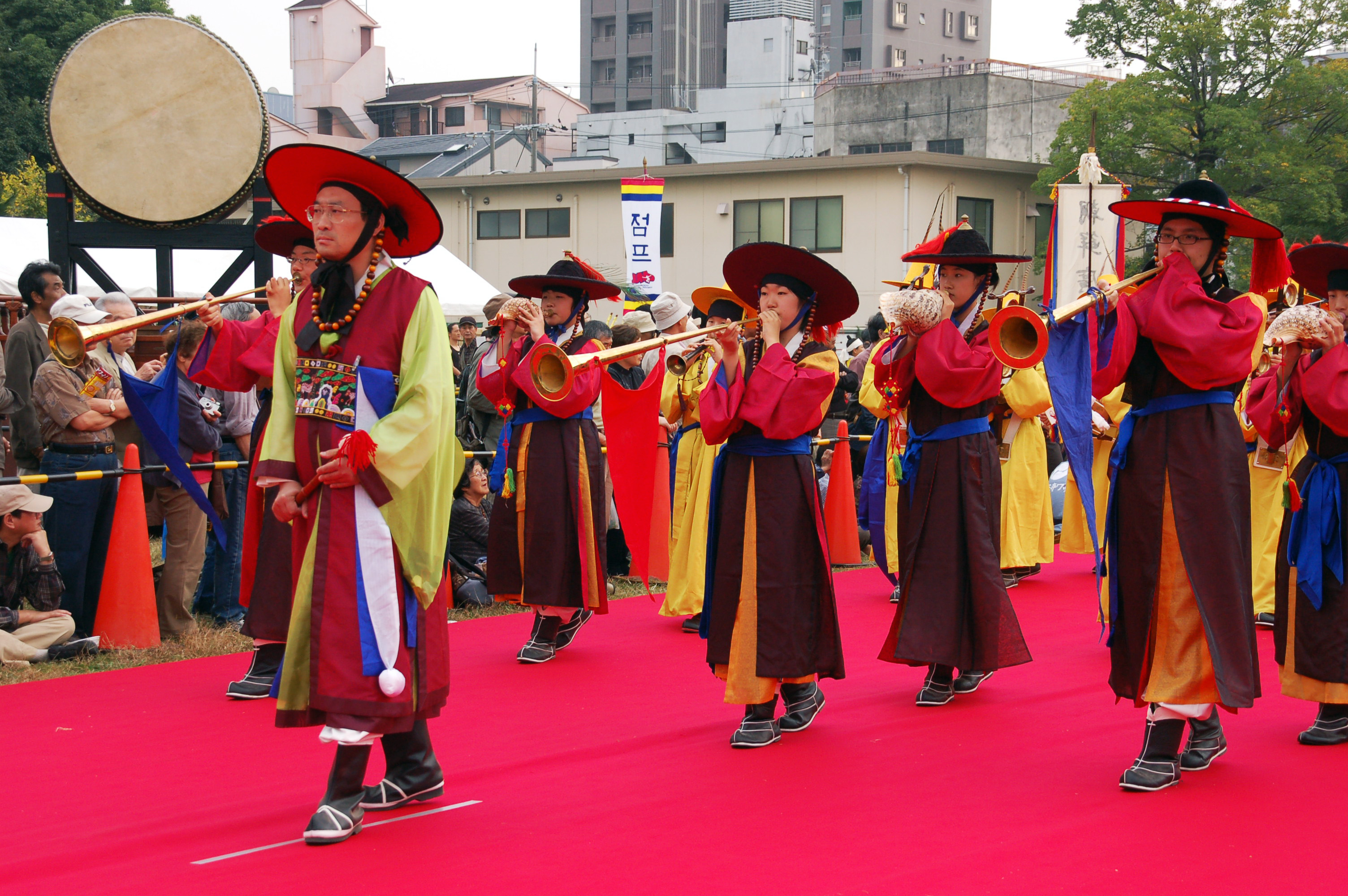

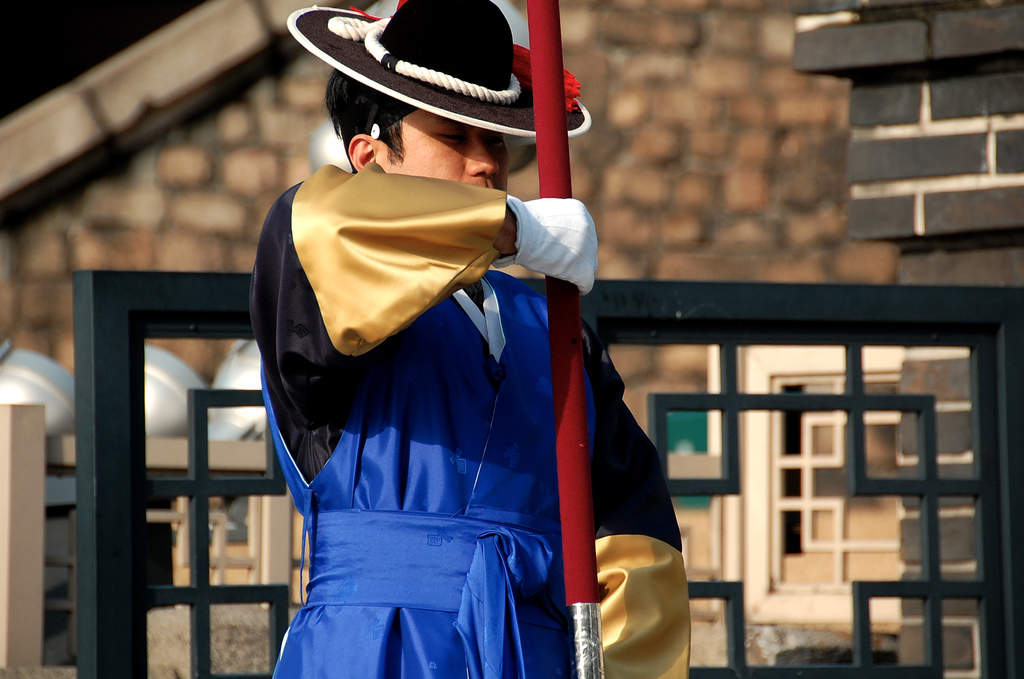
