= Perak (headdress) =

Headgear of the Himalayan region

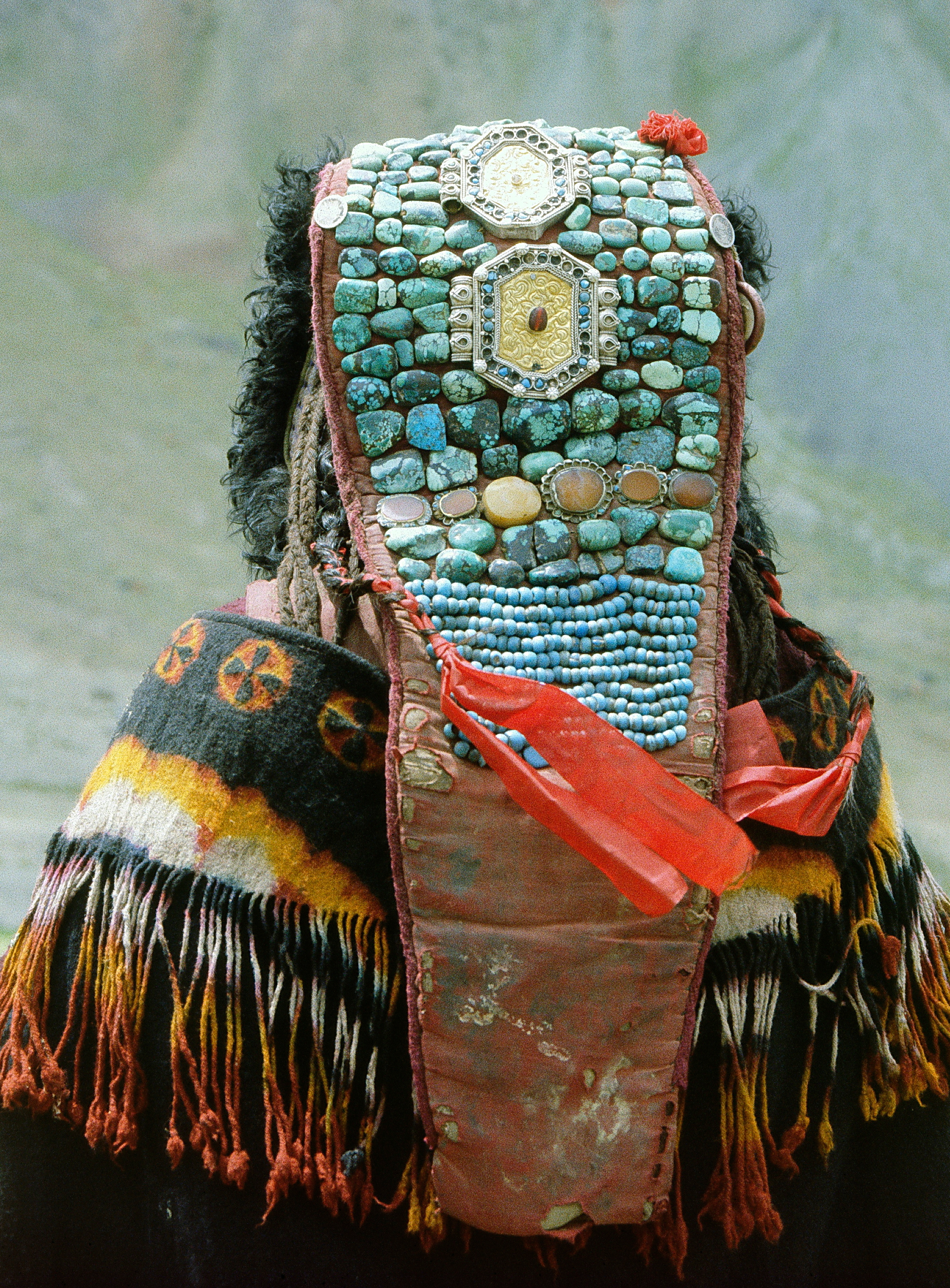
A perak being worn by a Zanskari woman

A perak is a headdress typically worn by the old aristocracy in the Himalayan Ladakh region of Asia. It is composed of a strap of leather studded with semi-precious stones, such as lapis lazuli and turquoise.

== Symbolism ==
The perak is a symbol among the Ladakh of the rank and economic status of the woman wearing it. Traditionally, the number of front-to-back rows of turquoise signified the status of the wearer: nine rows for the queen of Leh (the Ladakh capital), seven rows for the more modern aristocracy, five for the marvels, and three for the lower ranks.

The jewels themselves are representative of the Ladakh deities, protecting and guiding the wearer through the dangerous human world.
