= Kidney belt =

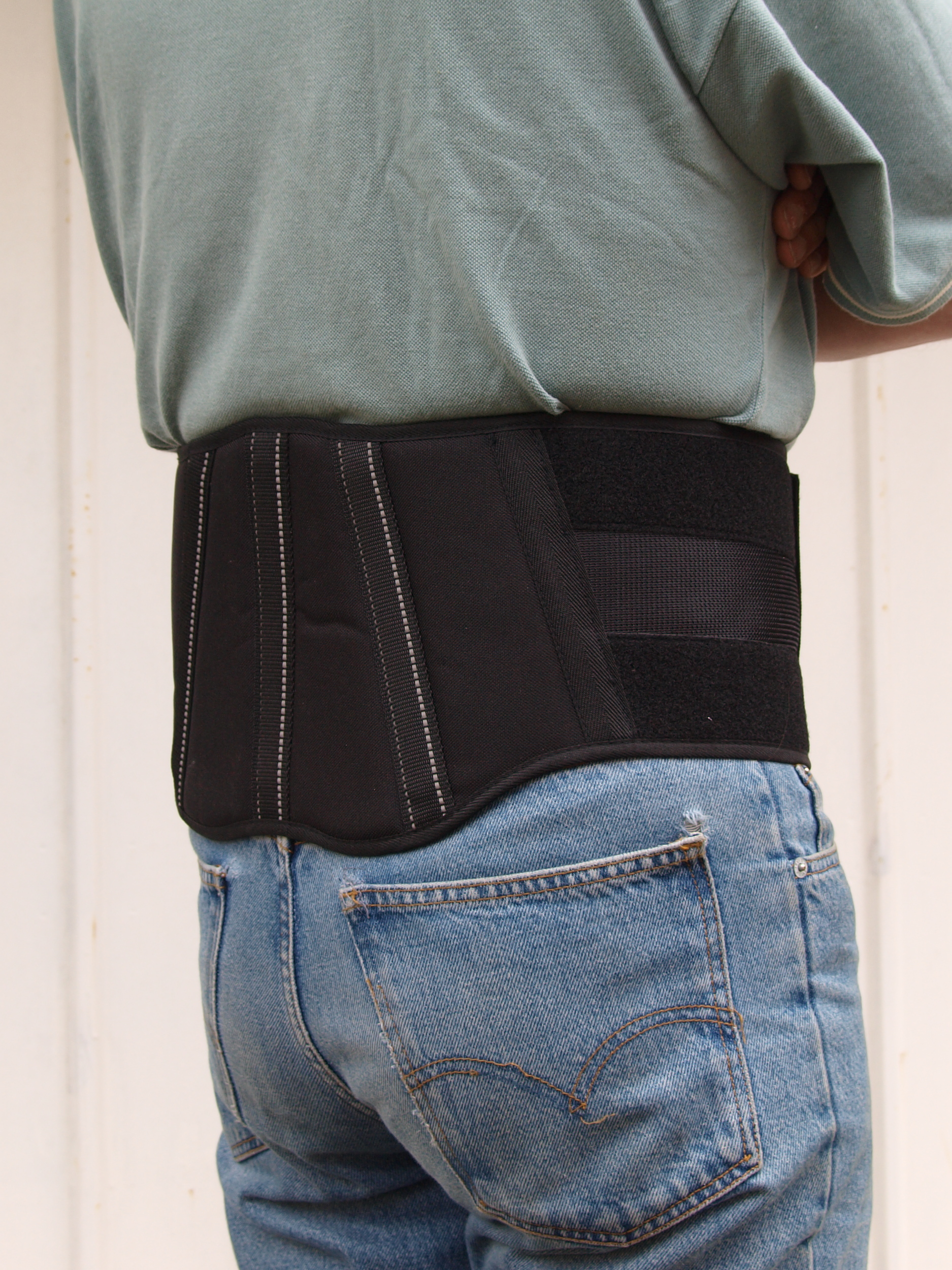
Motorcycle kidney belt

A kidney belt is a wide elastic band that is placed around the lower torso that is intended to protect a person's internal organs from damage from either strain or shock.

Kidney belts are often worn by weightlifters, and, sometimes, by manual laborers and medical patients. They are also used by motorcyclists, especially offroad riders and those engaged in long-distance motorcycle riding, to support the lower back, and to guard against wind chill. Stuttgart physician Peter Falb has stated that the support provided for motorcyclists is purely psychological; kidneys are naturally strongly supported to the rest of the body.
