= Freezy Freakies =

Snow gloves that reveal patterns on exposure to cold

Freezy Freakies were a winter fad in the early to mid-1980s.

They were snow gloves, created by ski glove company Swany America that used thermochromic ink to reveal fun colors and designs when exposed to cold temperatures. The gloves came in many designs, which catered to young kids. Designs included a fighter plane and a pink castle scene.
