= Style tribe =

Group who dresses distinctively

A style tribe or fashion tribe is a group of people that dress in a distinctive style to show their membership in this group. Examples include punks, goths, hip-hop devotees, and ravers. The term "style tribe" appears to have been coined by anthropologist Ted Polhemus, who analyzed style tribes in terms of the modern primitive and an abandonment of a linear trajectory of progress in fashion.
