= Gowni =

A gowni is a long, flowing, colourful, frilly garment worn by Zanzibari women.
