= Coconut jewelry =

Jewelry made from coconuts

Coconut jewelry has been made for generations by people in the rainforests and coasts of South America. The three types of coconut used in the production of the rings and earrings are known as palm nuts. The Pati (pah-chee), the Dende (den-day), and the Piasava (pee-ah-sava) palm nuts are related to the Tagua nut of Africa, also known as vegetable ivory. When tumbled and polished these types of coconuts reveal the beautiful colors that lay hidden beneath their raw outer surface.

The Pati coconut, by far, has the most variation in color, ranging from light beige to dark brown. Never displaying one solid color, even the darkest of Pati rings will reveal hints of reds and light browns. The Dende coconut, closely related to the Licuri palm nut, exhibits a much deeper brown complemented by light beige streaks. The Piasava coconut, with its hazel-brown shell, is the largest coconut that can be used for jewelry. This allows production of larger hoops. According to some makers of jewelry, after being worn for a few weeks, the colors on the Piasava rings and earrings will slowly begin to change into a slightly darker, richer caramel brown. Dende coconuts are also found in white, when they are young.

Mostly jewelry thus created from one coconut has a unique signature because every coconut is unique.

Coconut jewelry is also an important adjunct to the tourist industry in the Lamu area of coastal Kenya.
