= Attifet =

Headdress worn by European women in the 16th and 17th centuries

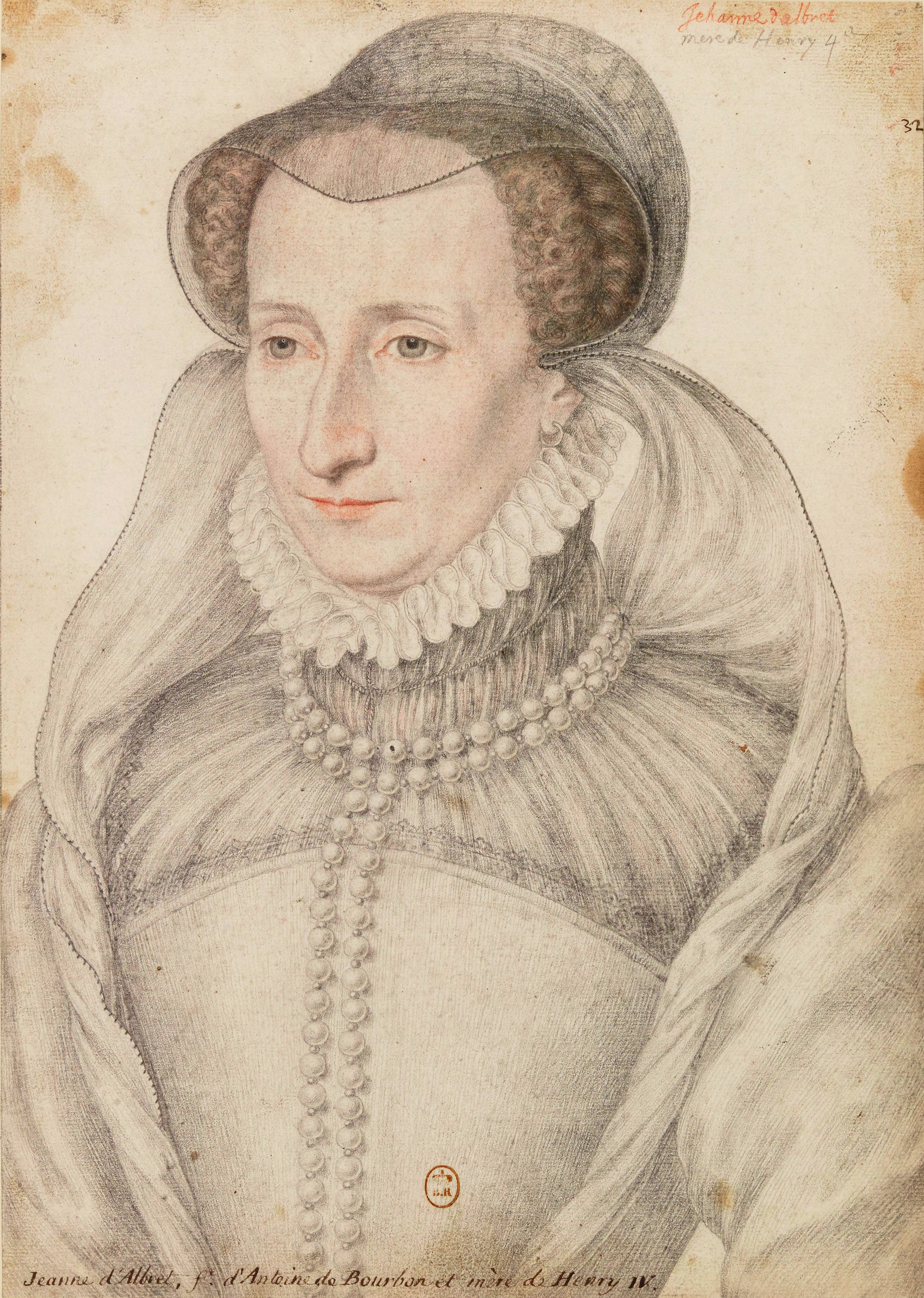
Jeanne d'Albret, Queen of Navarre, wearing an attifet, by François Clouet, 1570.

An attifet is a heart-shaped headdress with a point that dips over the forehead, worn by European women in the 16th and 17th centuries. It was first worn by Catherine de Medici and Mary Queen of Scots.

The attifet originated in France and was later also worn in countries such as England, Scotland and Czechoslovakia. Typically, the front of the attifet was held in shape by a wire frame. It dipped to a point over the forehead and then curved up and back in an arc on both sides. The attifet was usually made of silk or linen, and trimmed with lace or pearls. It was normally white, although there was also a black variant known as a widow's hood.
