= Camocas =

14th–15th century patterned oriental silk

Camocas is an expensive heavy patterned oriental silk. The Textile Glossary describes camocas as a "largely historic fabric that was popular in the 14th and 15th centuries". It was a very beautiful fabric which was often striped with gold or silver. It had a satin base and was diapered like fine linen... [a] silk cloth striped with gold and silver made in a castle in Palestine beginning in 12th century."

== Fashion and Royalty ==
According to Fashion in the age of the black prince: a study of the years 1340-1365, "Charles d'Artois is stated in detail as consisting of one cote of white camocas, and 1 surcot, mantel and chaperon of vermillion camocas, which he had as one of the said company for the feste de l'estoille." It continues to say that "camocas, sometimes specified in the same account as camocas de domasque (Damascucs), was an extremely expensive imported silk, the use of which for a livery of this kind of somewhat surprising".

Some of the embroidered garments of the king (such as royal doublets or aketons) were stuffed with camocas in murrey, blue, cendre and pink.

Princess Isabella and her ladies were given hoods in camocas of gold and blue.
