= Canepin =

Leather made from sheep or goat skin

Canepin is a fine leather made from the epidermis of sheep and goats. It is used to make women's gloves and to test the quality of scalpels. The word comes from the French word canepin (pronounced [kanəpɛ̃]), meaning "skin".
