= Shirt stays =

Clothing accessory

Shirt stays are elastic straps that connect the bottom of a dress shirt to the socks or feet. There are two main varieties: those that loop around the foot and those that clip onto the sock. All varieties have two clips at the top, one for the front and one for the back of the shirt. They are often used in military dress uniforms to prevent the shirt from untucking during the course of the day.
