= Vista All Terrain Pattern =

Camouflage pattern

Vista All Terrain Pattern (ATP)

Vista All Terrain Pattern is a commercially available camouflage pattern designed to be very similar to the military Multi-Terrain Pattern (MTP) currently issued to the British Armed Forces and a small number of other nations.

== Development ==
Licensing restrictions on the MTP have meant that it is only available commercially on military products released as surplus. Non-military manufacturers have largely responded by using U.S. Crye Precision Multicam fabrics for their products, but this has increased cost in the UK due to import duties. Against this background UK manufacturer Coating Applications Group (CAG), an official MTP fabric manufacturer, created Vista ATP, which closely resembles MTP.

== Materials ==
Initially available in only two variants, Vista ATP was extended to the following materials:

- 300, 500 and 1000 Denier texturised Nylon
- Polycotton ripstop
- 19 mm – 25 mm Infrared-resistant webbing
- Cotton gabardine clothing fabric

== See also ==
- List of camouflage patterns
- Personal load carrying equipment
