= Courtepy =

A courtepy is a doublet that has been deeply pleated from the shoulders to the waist around the entire garment, and then flared over the hips. There is also an undershirt, and many different sleeve styles.
