= All over print =

Type of textile printing

In streetwear fashion, an all over print (also known as all-over-print) is a print composed of a design that is repeated across the entire surface of a garment. The image is on both the front and back. Often, such prints are screen printed. Other processes include dye-diffusion of the fabric itself and printed t-shirts. All over printing relies on synthetic fibers as they can best withstand the process. One way to check for all over printing is to be sure the pattern or design can be seen on the seam, hem, and around zippers.

== History ==
Modern all over printing was facilitated by the invention of sublimation printing in 1957 (not to be confused with commercial sublimation on cellulose in 1929, as the substrate is polyethylene terephthalate (PET)). Rather, the commercial process was developed by Noel de Plasse in Lainere de Roubaix, France.

== Technique ==
The process is similar to the process of dye-diffusion: a graphic is printed onto a sheet of high-release paper and then transferred onto fabric using high heat and pressure. Heat converts the solid dye particles into a gas through sublimation. The liquid phase is skipped due to the instantaneous nature of the physical change. This immediacy bonds the released chemicals to the polyester fibers. Unlike screen printing and direct-to-garment digital printing, the process of printing sees dye absorbed directly into the fabric. The design is printed on 100% polyester material.

Often, this printing is done onto white fabric, as this base colour allows for the best applicability.

== Advantages and disadvantages ==
Advantages of dye-sublimation over other methods of textile printing:

- Pictures do not peel off fabric, unlike typical screen printing.
- Dye does not mount on fabric.
- The intensity of colour is often unmatched due to the direct permeation of dye.
- No need to half-print screens or cut fabric.
- The continuous nature of the print allows all of the medium to be a canvas.

Disadvantages:

- Speed is reduced due to continuous nature of printing.
- Possibility of white creases and irregular printing per-batch.
- Some dyes work better than others.
