= Montera picona =

Type of hat

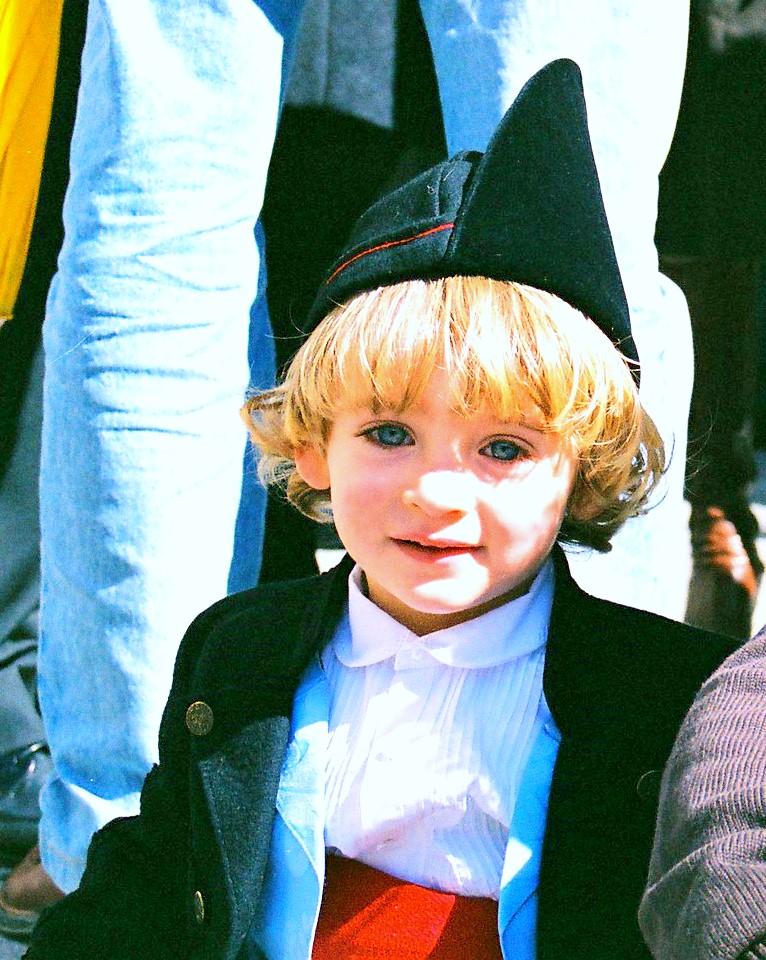
A boy wearing a montera picona

The montera picona is a traditional Asturian hat, made of dark wool and worn by men. It features a pointed flap that was once used to cover the face against the cold, though it is now largely ornamental. It is less commonly worn, but remains a symbol of Asturian culture, part of the traditional Asturian costume (the paxellu) worn by bagpipe bands.
