= Cache-cœur =

Women's top

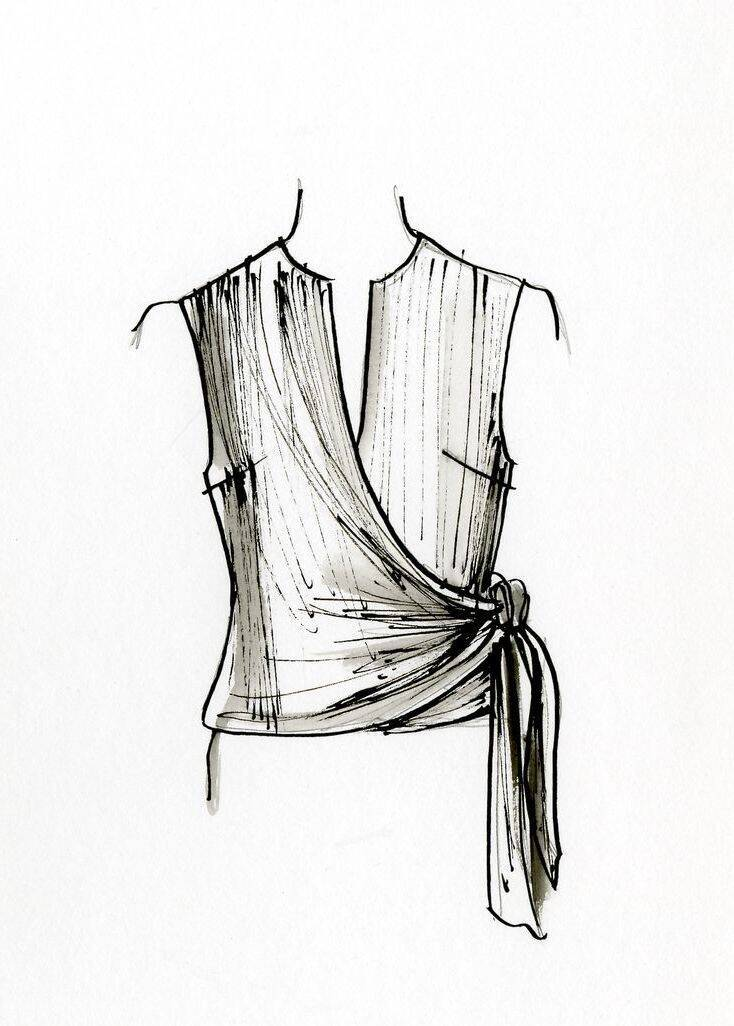
Cache-cœur.

A cache-cœur (French for "hide the heart") is a top for women, composed of two finished triangular parts, each having a strap. It is closed by overlapping the two segments and tying the straps behind the back or along the side, depending on the length. The triangular shape of the sides makes the garment a type of V-neck.
