= Coat pocket =

Explanation, with examples

Pockets are a practical but often overlooked feature in menswear. From prehistory all the way up until the 17th century, what we consider to be a pocket–pouches sewn into clothing–did not exist. Since its invention however, it has evolved and transitioned alongside western fashion.

The main forms of external pockets on jackets (in order of increasing formality) are: patch, flap, and jetted.(1)

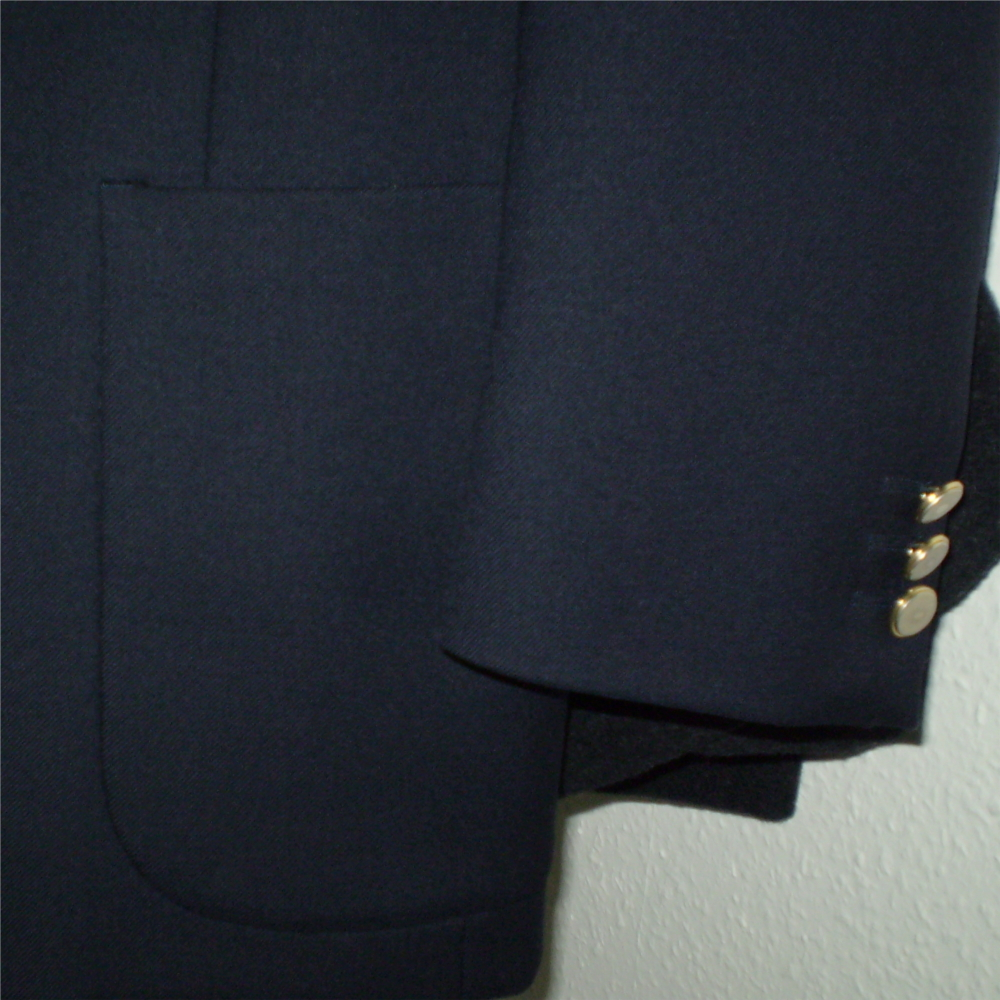
A patch pocket on a reefer jacket

The patch pocket is, with its single extra piece of cloth sewn directly onto the front of the jacket, a sporting option, sometimes seen on summer linen suits, or other informal styles.

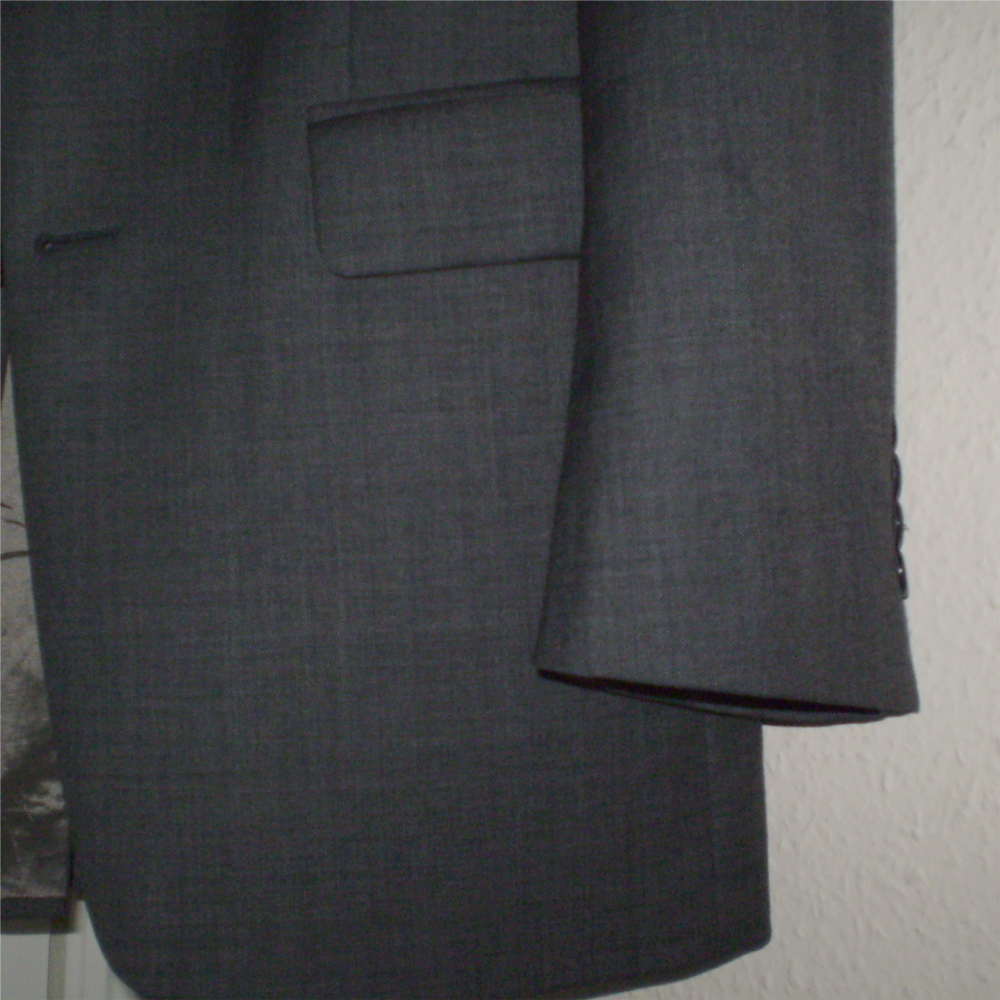
A jetted pocket with flap on a lounge suit jacket

The jetted flap pocket is standard for hip pockets, with a small strip of fabric taping the top and bottom of the slit for the pocket. It has a lined flap of matching fabric covering the top of the pocket, sewn in along the seam of the jetting. This flap was initially created to protect the contents of the pocket from any rain, and is therefore traditionally meant to be tucked in when indoors, leaving the jettings exposed for show. However, because this fact is now often ignored and the flap is seen as an accessory that completes the style, it is commonly left out indoors, even during formal events.

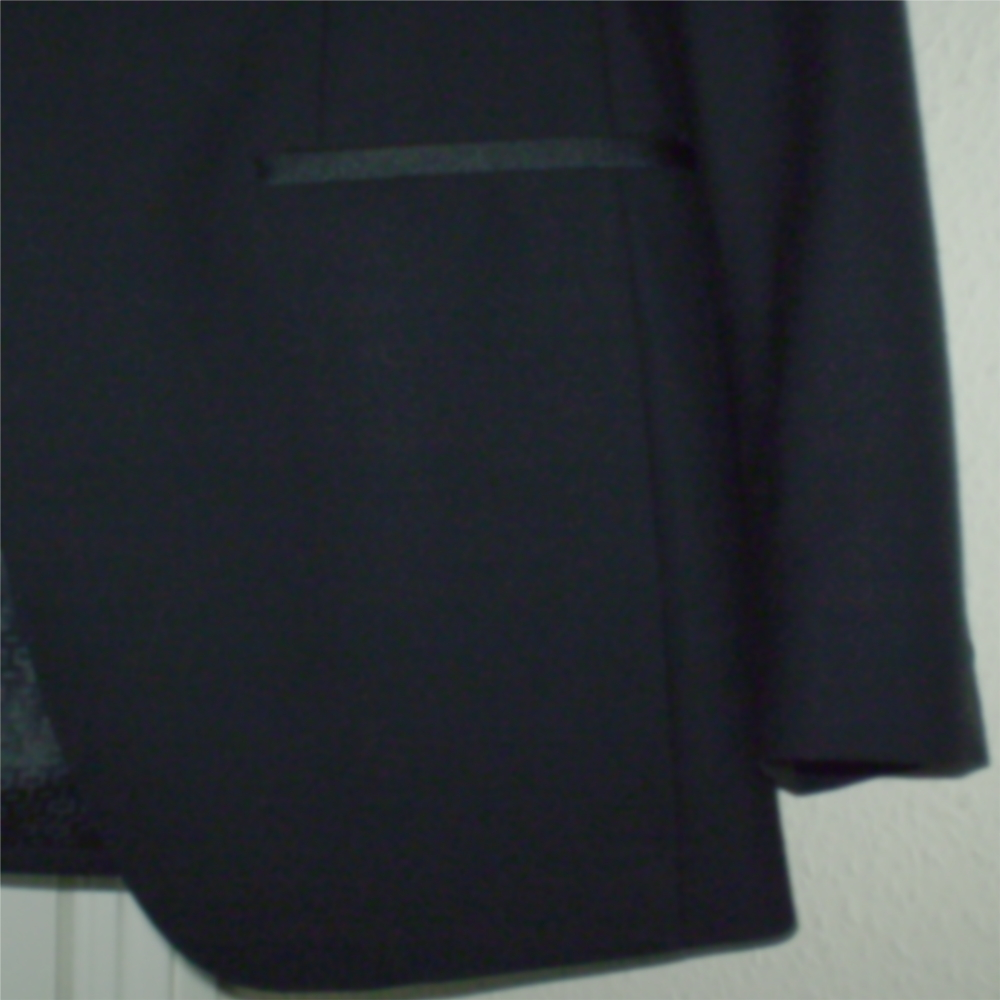
A jetted pocket on a dinner jacket

A jetted pocket with no flap is most formal. This style is most often on seen on formal wear, such as a dinner jacket.

In addition to the standard two outer pockets, some suits have a third, the ticket pocket, usually located just above the right pocket and roughly half as wide. While this was originally exclusively a feature of country suits, used for conveniently storing a train ticket, it is now seen on some town suits. Another country feature also worn sometimes in cities is a pair of hacking pockets, which are similar to normal ones, but slanted; this was originally designed to make the pockets easier to open on horseback while hacking, also called pleasure riding.

== Bibliography ==
- Antongiavanni, Nicholas (2006). The Suit: A Machiavellian Approach to Men's Style. HarperCollins. ISBN 978-0-06-089186-2.
- Druesedow, Jean L.; Jno. J. Mitchell Co (1990). Men's Fashion Illustrations from the Turn of the Century: by Jno. J. Mitchell Co. Courier Dover Publications. ISBN 978-0-486-26353-3.
- Keers, Paul (October 1987). A Gentleman's Wardrobe: Classic Clothes and the Modern Man. Weidenfeld & Nicolson. ISBN 978-0-297-79191-1.
- Flusser, Alan (1985). Clothes and the Man: The Principles of Fine Men's Dress. Villard. ISBN 0-394-54623-7.
- Flusser, Alan (2002). Dressing the Man: Mastering the Art of Permanent Fashion. HarperCollins. ISBN 0-06-019144-9.
- The Nu-Way Course in Fashionable Clothes-Making. Nu-Way. 1926. Archived from the original on 2008-07-05.
