= New Year's glasses =

Novelty eyeglasses

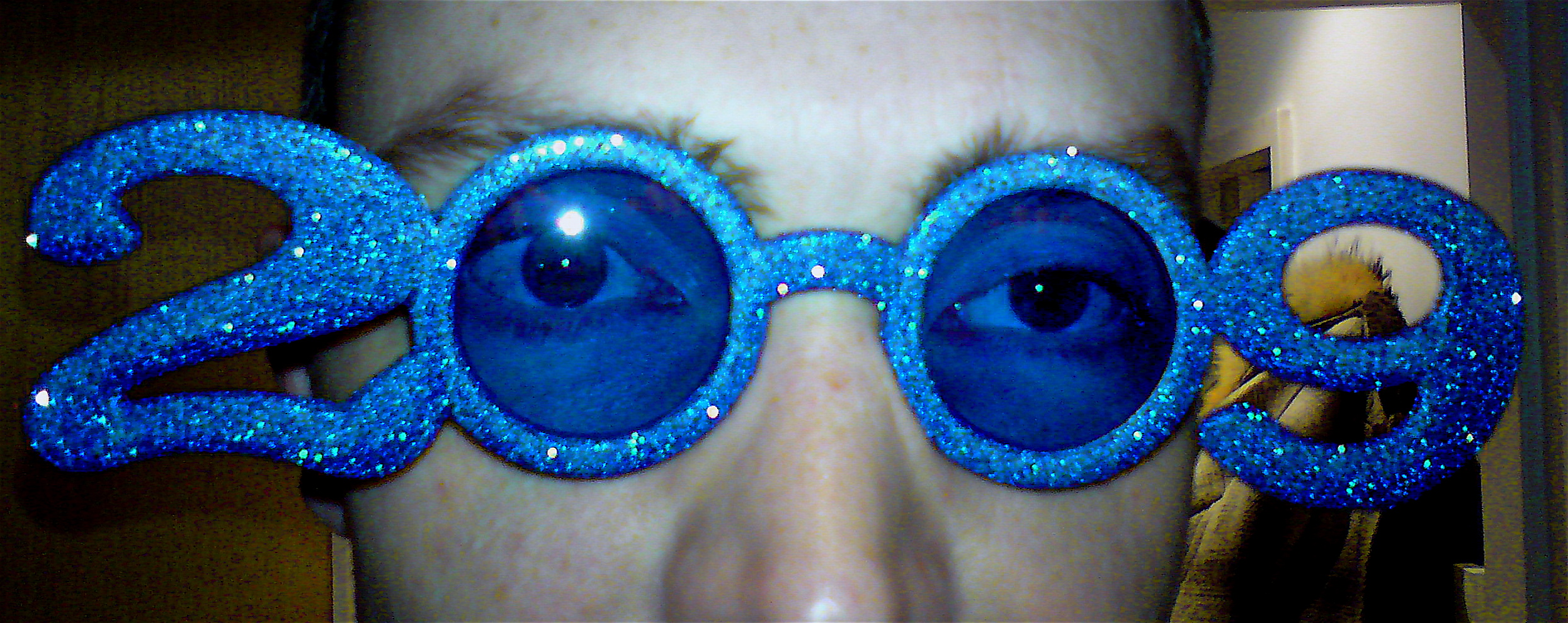
A pair of New Year's glasses for 2009. The chassis is made up of the 00 digits in the year.

New Year's glasses are novelty eyeglasses in the numerical shape of the coming year usually worn during New Year's Eve parties. They were invented and patented by Richard Sclafani and Peter Cicero in 1992, although other companies have produced similar versions. New Year's glasses' inspiration and popularity arose from the fact that the two digits in the middle of the year number (9 and 0 from the years 1990–2009) had holes suitable for looking through or mounting lenses into.
