= Ganse cord =

Cord used in millinery

A ganse cord is a type of cord used in millinery to give shape to a hat. It was used extensively in the 18th and 19th centuries, particularly in tricorns, bicornes and shakos used in military uniforms. The cord is tied in a special knot called Noeud de franciscain. The ganse loop made from the cord was also used to hold the cockade in place on the head covering.
