= Hat tax =

Former British tax on men's hats

The hat tax, or hat duty, was a tax levied by the British Government from 1784 to 1811 on men's hats. The tax was introduced during the first ministry of Pitt the Younger and was designed to be a simple way of raising revenue for the government in a rough accordance with each person's relative wealth. It was supposed that the rich would have a large number of expensive hats, whereas the poor might have one cheap hat or none at all.

The hat tax required hat retailers to buy a licence and to display the sign Dealer in Hats by Retail. The cost of the retail licence was two pounds for London and five shillings elsewhere. Each man's hat was required to have a revenue stamp pasted inside on its lining.

The cost of the duty depended on the cost of the hat. For hats costing under four shillings, a duty of threepence was paid. For hats costing between four and seven shillings, sixpence was levied, and a shilling for those between seven and twelve shillings. For expensive hats over twelve shillings, the duty was two shillings. Heavy fines were given to anyone, milliner or hat wearer, who failed to pay the hat tax. However, the death penalty was reserved for forgers of hat-tax revenue stamps.

The hat tax was not the only duty raised by the government on household items. The best known such tax was the window tax, which was implemented in 1697, and was not repealed until 1851. Other similar taxes were the dice duty (1711–1862), almanac tax (1711–1834), wallpaper tax (1712–1836), brick tax (1784–1850), glove tax (1785–94), hair-powder tax (1786–1869) and perfume tax (1786–1800).

Although these twenty-seven years saw rapid inflation, a shilling of that period had the purchasing power of about £3.40 today.
