= Matron's badge =

Ancient Scottish headdress

The matron's badge or brèid is a gentlewoman's headdress worn in the Scottish Highlands in former times. It consists of a square of fine linen, pinned round the head, fastened with cords of silk or gold. The matron's badge was donned by a woman the morning after her marriage, and was regarded as the badge of wifehood.
