= Shalu (sari) =

Regional variant of the sari from Banaras (Varanasi), India

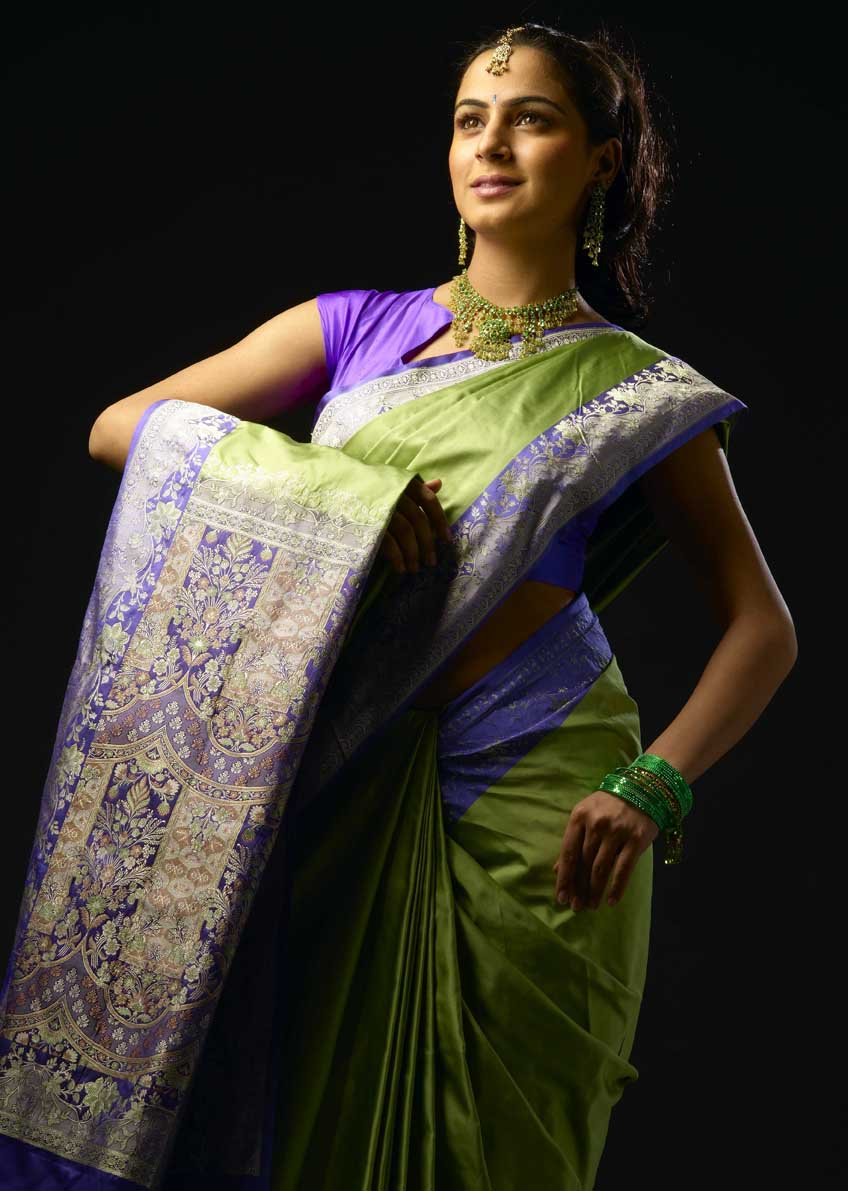
Shraddha Arya wearing a Sari

A Shalu is a regional variant of the sari from Banaras (Varanasi), India. It is one of many types of saris and differs in the fact that it is the result of combining Paithani fabric and Banarasi fabric. Paithani, named after the Paithan town in Aurangabad Maharashtra, is made from very fine silk and is characterized by borders of an oblique square design, and a pallu with a Peacock design. Banarasi, also known as Banarasi Silk, is a fine variant of Silk that originates from the city of Varanasi in Uttar Pradesh, India. One of the biggest differences with the Shalu Sari, in comparison to others, is that it is completely embellished at the base with what is called "jari" motifs.

Shalu saris are often worn by brides in Maharashtra.
