= Azerbaijani traditional clothing =

Traditional costume of Azerbaijan

Azerbaijani traditional clothing (Azerbaijani: Azərbaycan milli geyimi) is the traditional attire of the Azerbaijani people. It is closely connected to its history, religious culture and national identity.

Costumes and dresses are of great importance in Azerbaijani culture. Azerbaijani style is visible in ornaments of costumes with artistic embroideries in weaving and knitting. In the 17th century, the territory of modern Azerbaijan was of great importance to the silk industry. Silks were produced in the cities Shamakhi, Basqal, Ganja, Shaki, Shusha, and others.

The style of clothes and their colours reflects their wearers' marital status, wealth, and other information.

== Men's wear ==
=== Outerwear ===
National outerwear for men consists of a ust koyney (shirt) or Chepken, Arkhalig, Gaba, Chukha and Kurk.

- Arkhalig – a long, tight, waist-jacket made of fabrics including silk, satin, cloth, cashmere and velvet, depending on the social status of its owner.
- Chukha – male humeral outerwear with layers and gathers that is detachable at the waist. It is made of cloth, tirma, and homespun textiles.
- Kurk – a sheepskin coat reaching down to the ankles

A Russian ethnographer writes about Azerbaijani male costume:

Underwear consists of straight and short shirts of coarse calico, white and mostly dark blue colours with underpants of this very material, which are fastened with tapes on the waist; in winter they are worn over woolen large pants, which are also fastened with tapes. Over a shirt is worn arkhalig made of cotton. Arkhalig is such as a Russian man's long tight-fitting coat with a short waist and short skirt with gathers on the belt; it is always fastened tightly or in the midst or aside of the chest. Chukha is worn over arkhalig with a short waist and with a skirt with a length of below knees, but the head is covered with a small conic shaped hat made of lamb fur, throughout the year. Short woollen socks are worn to feet.

=== Headdresses ===
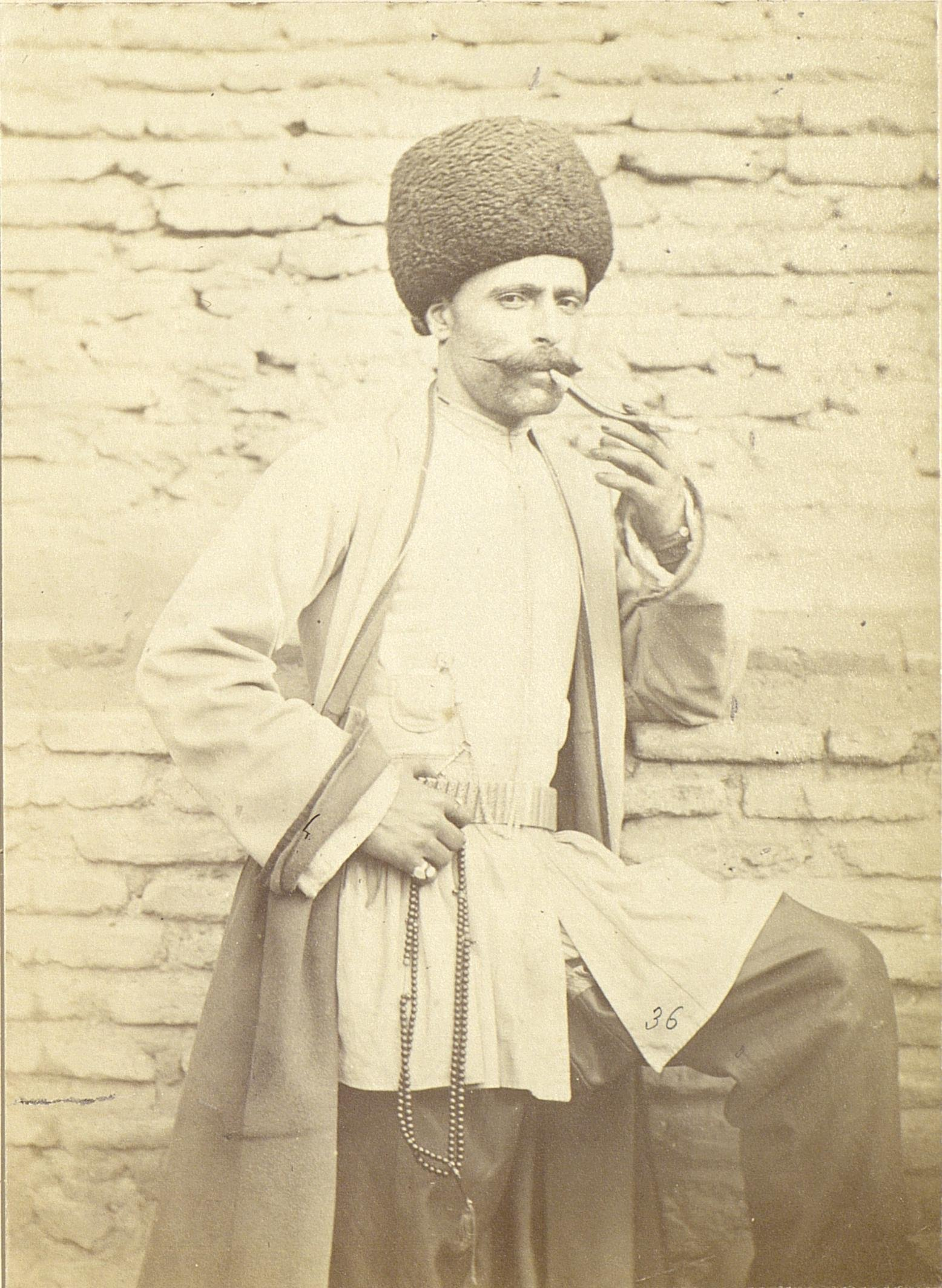
Tatar (later known as Azerbaijani) man in typical clothing. The second half of the 19th century.

The Papaq was considered a symbol of fortitude, honour and dignity of men on the modern territory of Azerbaijan and losing it was considered as a disgrace. To steal a Papaq was considered as a hostile action against its owner and knocking down a papaq was considered a grave insult. The social dignity of the Papaq's owner could be determined by its shape. Men never took off their papaqs, even during dinner) except before salat. Appearing in public without a headdress was deemed inappropriate.

- Papaqs made of lamb-fur or karakul, this was the main headwear for men. They had different forms and local names. According to E.Torchinskaya, there are four types of Azerbaijani papaqs in the State Hermitage Museum of Saint Petersburg:
- Motal papaq (or choban papagi – shepherd's papaq), which was made of long-haired lamb-fur and was conical, was generally worn by the underclass.
- Shish papaq (or bey papagi – bey's papaq) was conical or sharp-ended. According to the name of the material from which it was made, they had a general name – Bukhara papaq, a fur that was brought from Bukhara. It was worn only by representatives of the beys' estate and the wealthy. Such papaqs were common for the elite.
- Dagga (tagga) papaq was commonly worn in Nukhinsky Uyezd. Its top was made of velvet.
- Bashlyk, which is worn around the neck, consists of a hood and long, round ends. In winter, men wear a bashlyk made of cloth and wool. Bashlyks made of camel wool are valuable in Shirvan. The lining of a Bashylk is made of colourful silk because the lining is visible when the head is turned. Generally, the bashlyk is accompanied by a yapinji.
- Arakhchin is worn under other headdresses (papaq; chalma for women).

=== Shoes ===
- Jorabs are woollen socks that are popular in many Caucasian countries including Azerbaijan. City residents wear leather shoes with slip-ons. Boots are widespread among aristocrats.
- Charigs are everyday shoes made of leather or rawhide that are worn by villagers.

== Women's wear ==
The national female costume of Azerbaijan consists of outerwear and underwear. It includes chadra – a suck-formed shawl – and rubend, a veil that was worn by women when outdoors. Women's outerwear was made of bright and colourful textiles, the quality of which depended on the wealth of the individual or her family. The clothing also included jewellery such as golden and silver beads, buttons stylised as hordeum seeds, coins, delicate pendants and necklaces. Young women wore bright clothes with bright flowers, unlike their elders.

=== Outerwear ===
Women's outerwear consists of a shirt with wide sleeves, wide trousers to the ankle and bell-shaped shirts of the same length. Women also wore a knitted shirt with long sleeves (arkhalig, kulaja) that fitted tightly across the back and chest, and had a wide slit at the front. A tight belt was worn around the waist. A quilted, sleeveless jacket was worn in cold weather. Outerwear was often a cloak that was longer than the shirt. Women's shirts in Gazakh uyezd were long and had slits on each side.

=== Headdresses ===
The kelaghayi is popular amongst Azeri women, It is a square-shaped silk head scarf with prints on it.

== Gallery ==
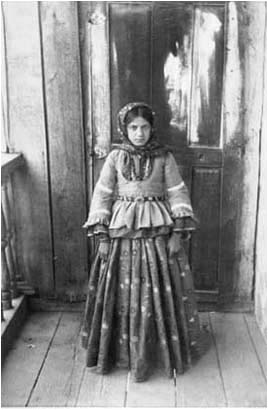
Azerbaijani girl from Shusha. Photographer Konstantin Zanis. 1898.

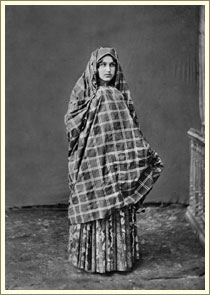
Young Azerbaijani from Shamakhi. 1883.

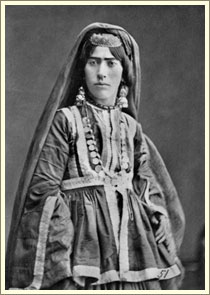
Azerbaijani from Baku. 1883.

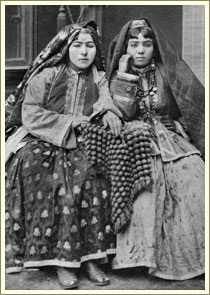
Baku Azerbaijanis in neat costumes. Photographer Luarsabov. 1881.
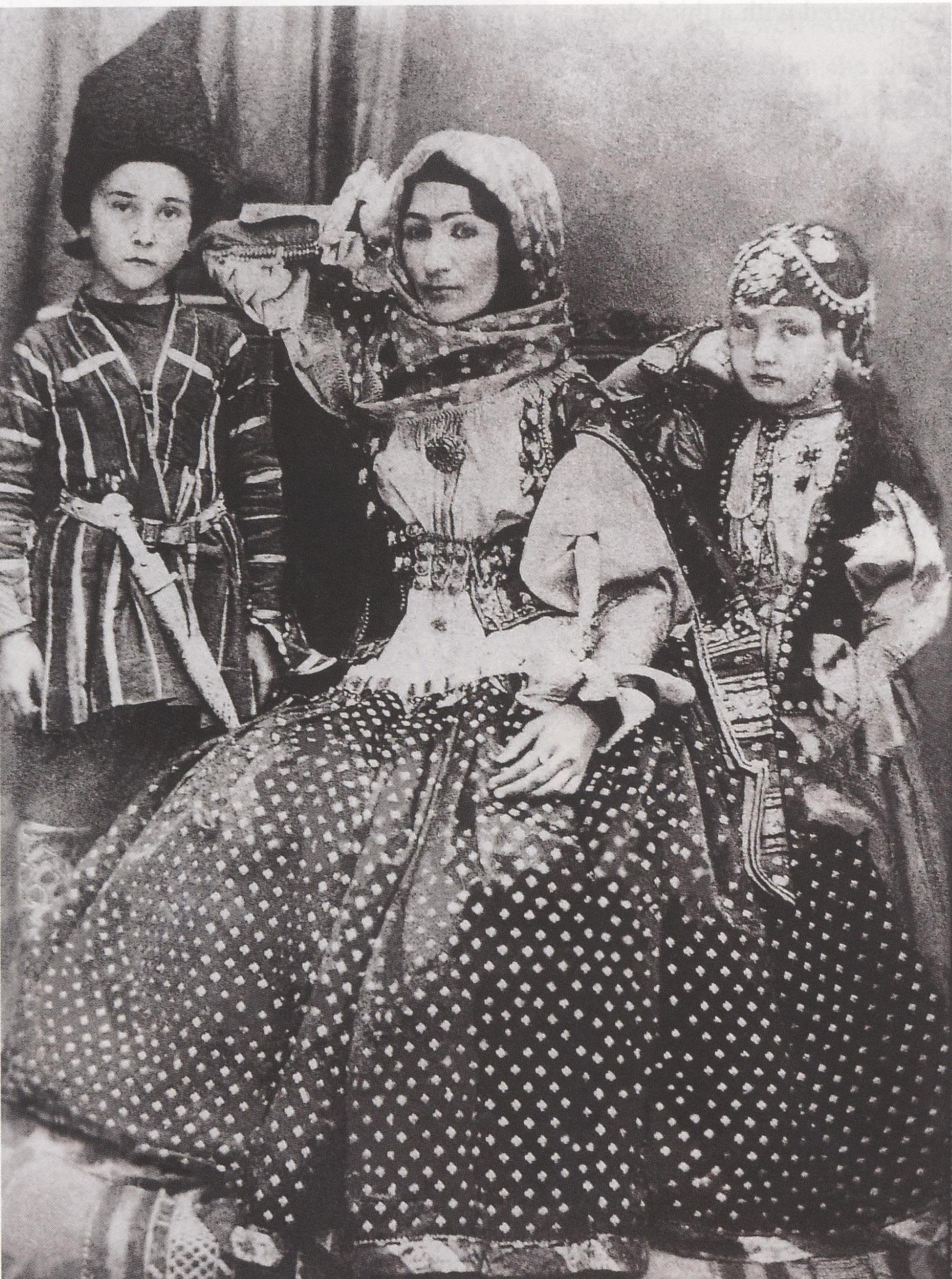
Khurshidbanu Natavan with her son Mehdigulu Khan Vafa and daughter Khanbike.

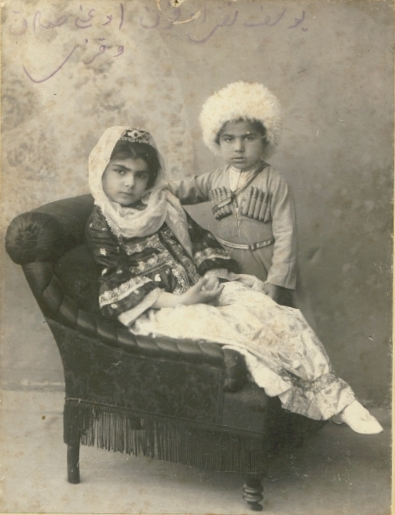
Yusif Naghiyev's son and daughter (son-in chukha, daughter-in Chepken).

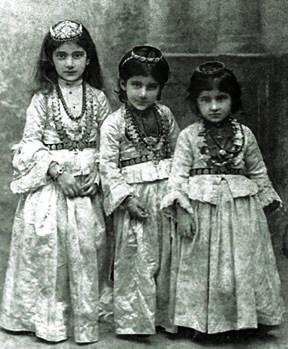
Sara Ashurbeyli with sisters.

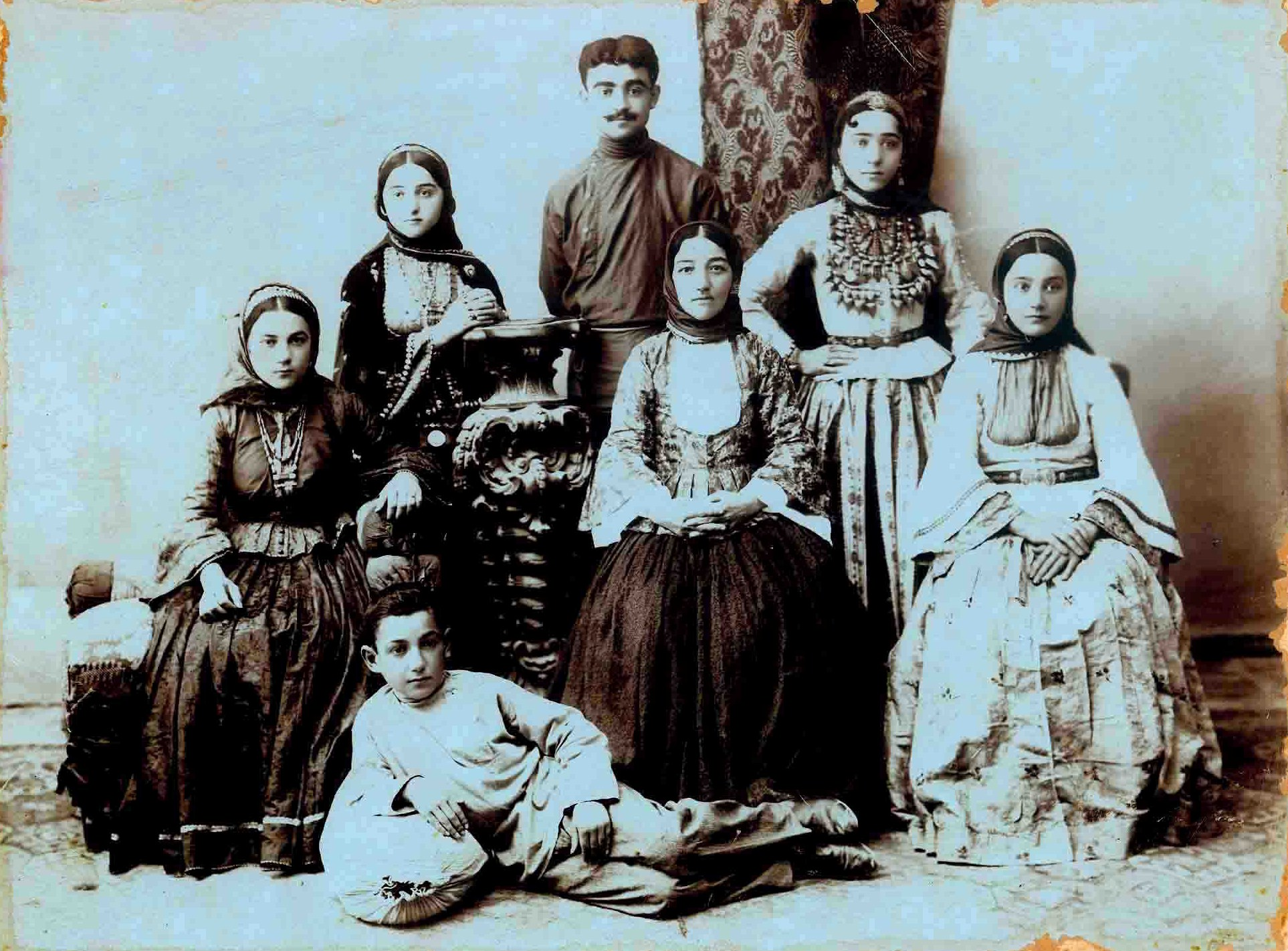
Yusif Vazir Chamanzaminli with his family.

=== In philately ===
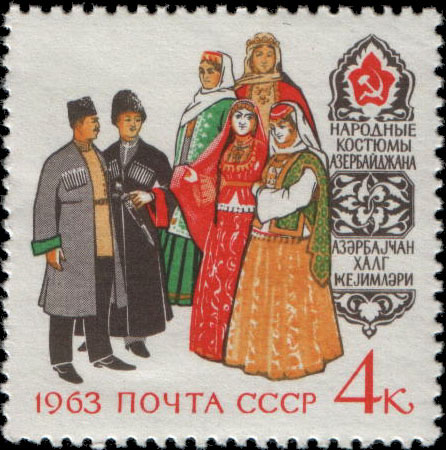
USSR stamp, 1963

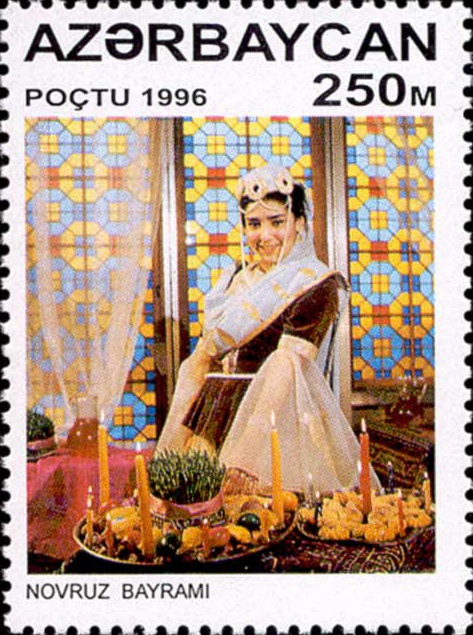
Azerbaijani stamp, 1996

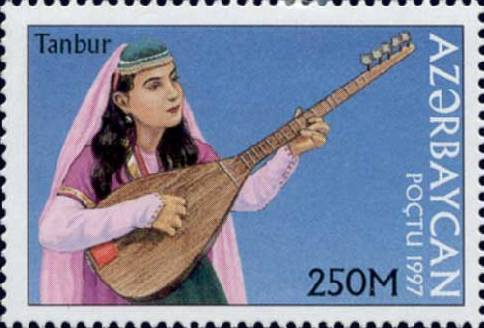
Azerbaijani stamp, 1997

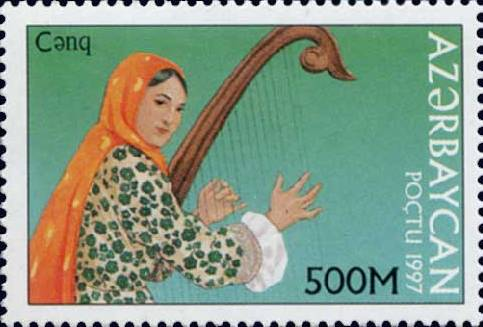
Azerbaijani stamp, 1997
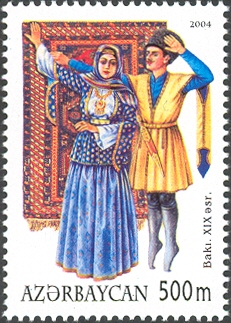
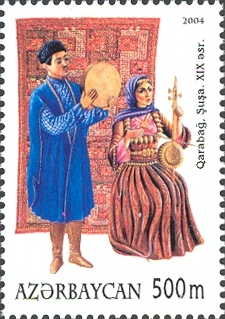
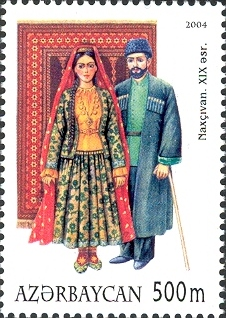
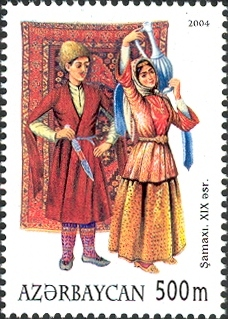
Azerbaijan stamps from 2004 depicting 19th century attire. Regional clothes from left to right: Baku, Shusha, Nakhchivan, Shamakhi
