= Kelaghayi =

Silk headscarf

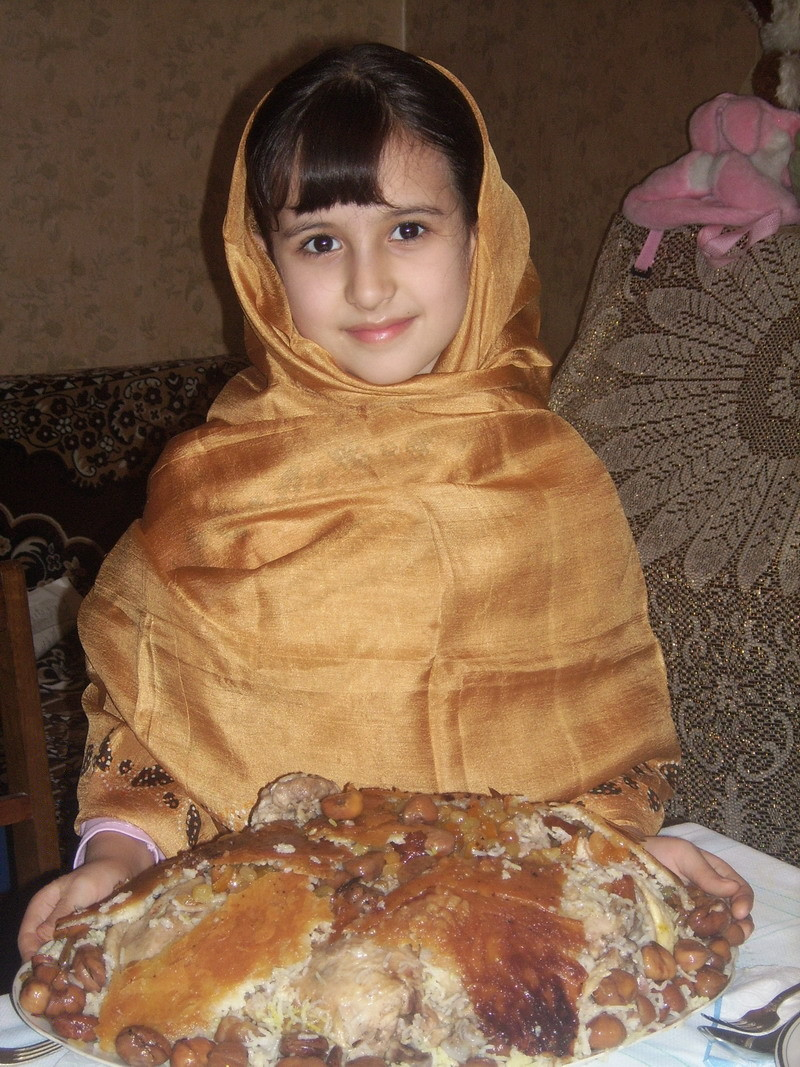
- Azerbaijani girl wearing kelaghai
- Type: Headgear
- Material: Silk

Traditional art and symbolism of Kelaghayi, making and wearing women’s silk headscarves
- UNESCO Intangible Cultural Heritage
- Country: Azerbaijan
- Reference: 00669
- Region: Europe and North America

Inscription history
- Inscription: 2014 (9th session)
- List: Representative

Kelaghayi (Azerbaijani: Kəlağayı; Armenian: քալաղայ), ‌‌Hawri (Kurdish: Hewrî or هەوری) or Golvani (Kurdish: Gulwenî or گوڵوەنی) also known as "charghat" (çarğət from Persian چارقد), is a traditional Azerbaijani and Armenian women's headgear. It is a square-shaped silk head scarf with special prints on it. In November 2014 at the 9th session of UNESCO's traditional art and symbolism of Kelaghayi, its production and the wearing were included in the list of intangible cultural heritage UNESCO.

== Etymology ==
Kelaghayi is found in various dialects of Azerbaijani, Turkish, and Armenian, known as kalagaz in Istanbul, kelāyağı or keleyağı in Kars, kəlağayı in Azerbaijan, and kalaghay in Armenian. Kelaghayi was borrowed from the Armenian term k'alałay (քալաղայ), meaning "silk kerchief" or "city-fashion women's head-covering". The Armenian term could possibly originate from Persian kalāx, meaning "gauze head-covering".

== Background ==
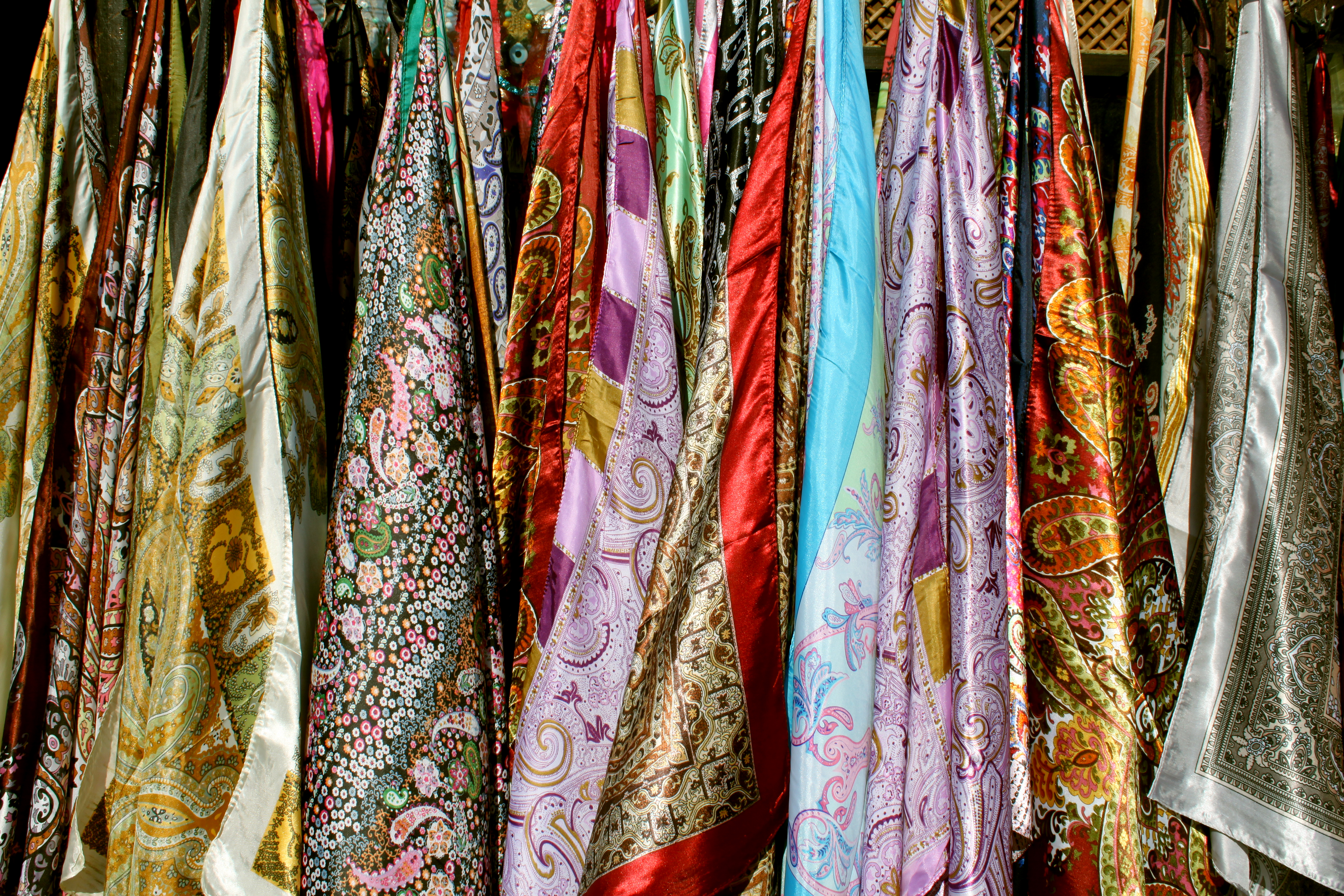
Examples of Kelaghayi shawls

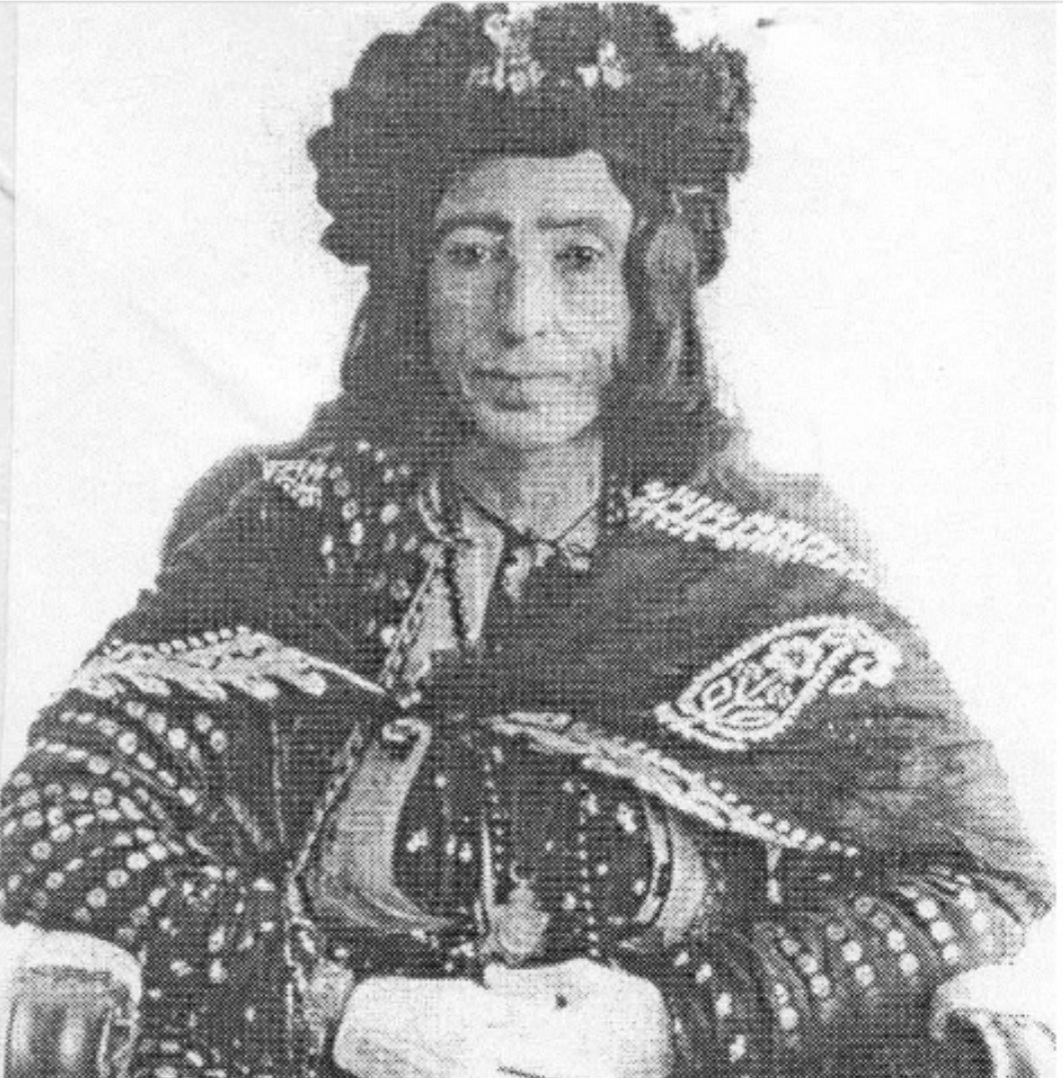
Lady Adela (1847-1920) wearing Kurdish hewrî

Kelaghayi is a four-cornered shawl woven from silk thread and worn by the women as a symbol of chastity, respect, and devotion. Thin silk threads are woven together on a loom, and then boiled and dried into squares. They are dyed with vegetable dyes, and artisans use wood blocks and oils to stamp patterns. The silk keeps the wearer cool in the summer and warm in the winter. The process of making a kelaghayi takes two days and four separate artisans: the weaver, the dyer, the moulder (decorator), and ornamental master. Traditionally, all the artisans involved are men.

The colours and patterns of kelaghayi often have meaning and importance for events like weddings, engagements, mourning periods, and daily life. There are age and social differences in its wearing: older women wear kelaghayis of darker colours, mostly black and dark blue, whereas younger women opt for brighter ones, such as white, beige, bright blue, etc. If a woman gave a kelaghayi to a man, it signified that she accepted his proposal of marriage. She would then wear a red kelaghayi at their henna party.

A kelaghayi can be tied in various ways, depending on the region. In some places, a kelaghayi was tied over a triangular headscarf after collecting hair with a piece of gauze. As a result, there would be three headdresses worn simultaneously: first, the juna (gauze), then the kelaghayi and finally a triangular headscarf called kasaba, sarandaz, or zarbab.

Kelaghayi-making is concentrated in two cities in Azerbaijan, the city of Sheki and the Basgal settlement in Ismayilly. The tradition is passed down through non-formal apprenticeships, primarily through family occupation.

The clothes, fine needle-works and shawls made of Sheki silk were highly appreciated. For this reason, the local population engaged in kelaghayi production produced silk in Sheki and created kelaghayi in Basgal. Therefore, despite a certain distance between two regions, they connected with each other by “floss ties.”
