= Arakhchin =

Armenian headdress

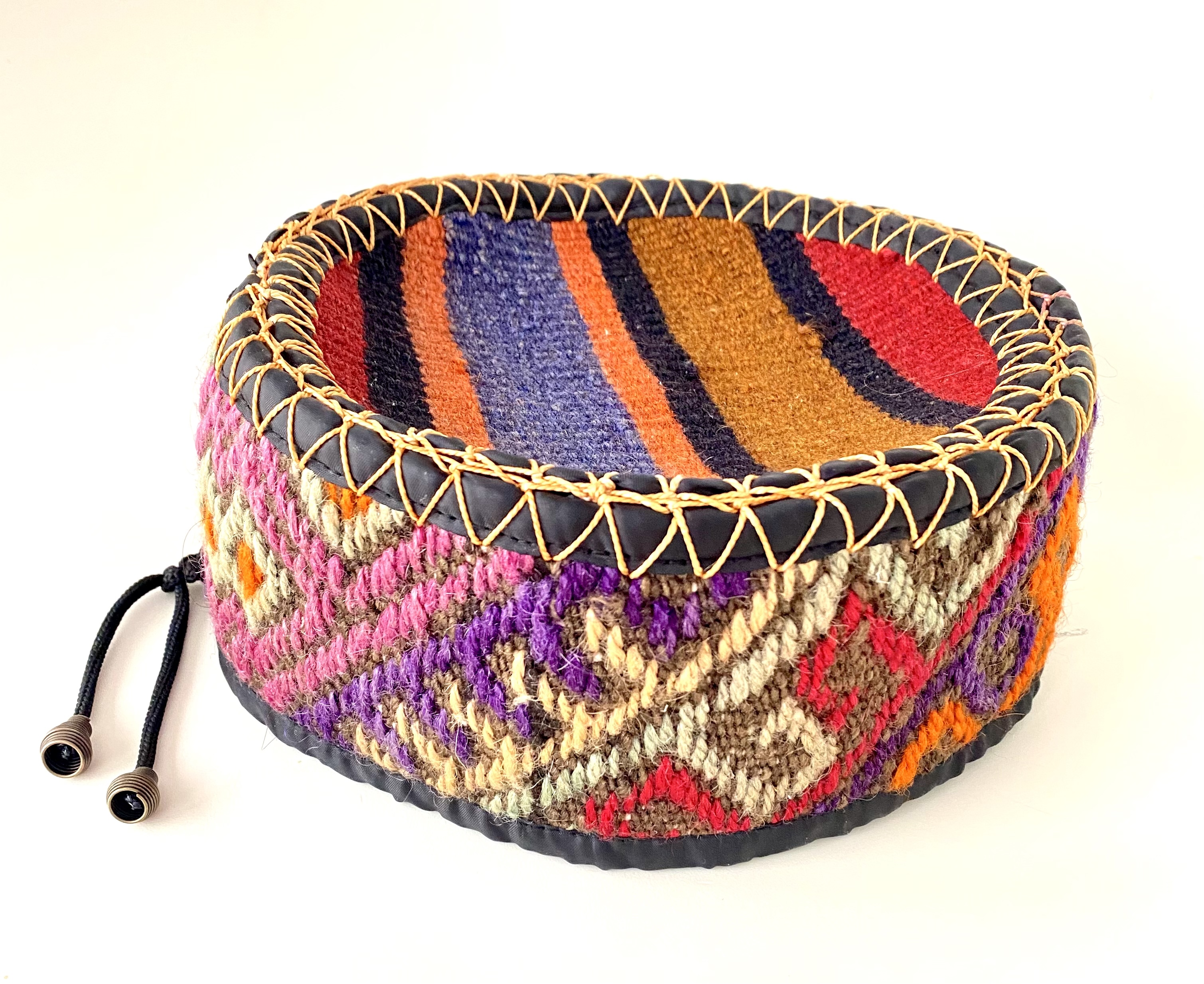
A traditional Armenian male arakhchi headdress, 21st century

An arakhchi (Armenian: արախչի, romanized: arakhchi, Azerbaijani: araxçın) is a traditional Armenian flat top skull cap headdress, worn by both Armenian men and women in the past.

Amongst Azerbaijanis, it is also worn, but almost exclusively by women as part of an attire that contains a headscarf called kalagay, and a small bonnet called täsäk, amongst other parts of clothing.

Arakhchis could be sewn of various textiles, such as tirma wool and silk. However, only one single-colour textile per arakhchi was used. The textile was made into a round shape fitting the head and then decorated with embroidery, lace, beads and even pieces of gold. Men's arakhchis were relatively plain, especially those used for religious purposes.

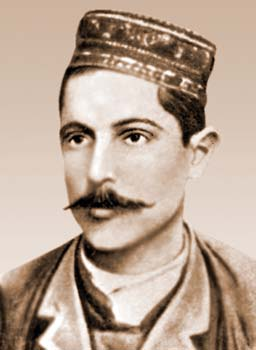
Hrayr Dzhoghk, an Armenian fedayi wearing an arakhchi

In Western Armenia, men, especially freedom fighters, wore a red arakhchi draped with a bandana with tinsel as their native headgear to identify themselves. The Armenian arakhchi was a truncated skull cap, knitted from wool or embroidered with multicolored woolen thread and a predominance of red. The way this traditional headdress was worn was a marker of its owner's marital condition, just as in Eastern Armenia, the right to wear an arakhchi belonged to a married man. Even though the arakhchi was traditionally a man's hat, Armenian women wore this headress as well; especially in Muş where Armenian singer Armenouhi Kevonian was known for her colorful arakhchi at her concerts. An arakhchi could be worn alone or under other headdresses, such as papakhi, a turban or a kalaghai. Women's arakhchis worn as early as the sixteenth century often lacked a special sack intended for braids. By the eighteenth century, it was already one of the most widespread headgears. Women used hairpins to secure their veils on the arakhchi.

== See also ==
- List of hat styles
