= Karin (historic Armenia) =

Karin (or Garin) was a region of historic Armenia, roughly encompassing parts of the Erzurum and Muş Provinces in present-day Turkey.

Karin (Erzurum) was founded by Armenians who migrated from eastern areas. Greeks, who called this city Karano, formed a significant percentage of the population. When Romans came, Armenians gave the city to Emperor Theodosios II as a gift.

Later, the city was occupied by Arabs (Arz-ı Rum) (Land of the Rum). Georgians called the city Karnu-kalaki. The city is an Eastern – Black Sea city of Turkey.

== History ==
In 1071, Seljuk Turks took possession of the city and carried out severe massacres of its population. Greek chronicler John Skylitzes reported that during the seizure of Erzurum, the Seljuk Turks killed 140 thousand people. Although this number is probably inflated, it reflects the heavy consequences of the Seljuk Turk siege on the local Armenian and Greek communities.

In later years, a 15th-century Spanish historian described Erzurum as: "The city was located on a plateau, had a strong stone wall with towers, as well as a fortress. The city wasn't very populated, and there was a beautiful church. Before, the city had belonged to Christian Armenians and had been mostly populated by them."

Karin had an important role for Turks in Russo – Turkish Wars and in the 1914 eastern campaign. Residents joined the war effort leaving few residents. Turkish leader Atatürk became a parliamentarian of Karin, and made Erzurum Congress.
