= Jorabs =

Knitted socks or slippers of Central Asia, the Balkans, and the Middle East

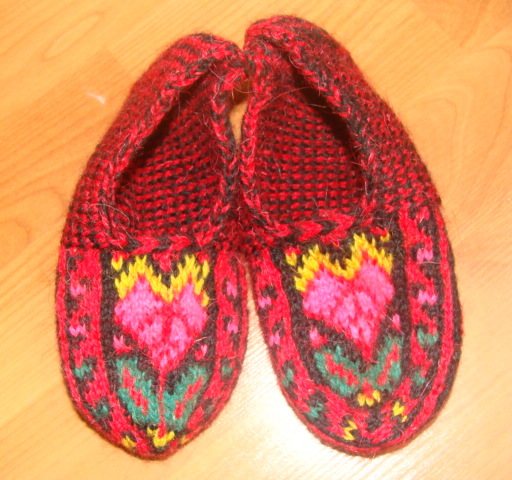
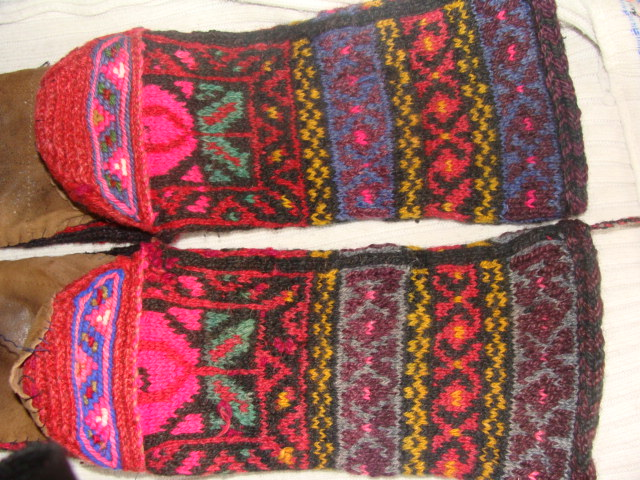
Dagestan-style jorabs

Jorabs are multicolored socks with intricate patterns, knitted from the toe-up. They are usually worn in such a way as to display rich decoration.

== Etymology ==
The word jorab originates from the Arabic word جورب (jourab) which has a general meaning of "socks." Other known variants of the term are “çorap" (Turkish), "чорап" (Bulgarian, Macedonian) "čarape" (Serbian), “corab" (Azerbaijani), "čarapa" (Bosnian), “Ҷӯроб" (Tajik), and "şətəl" (Tat).

The same concept is also known by such local terms as “kyulyutar” in Lezgin, “tturs” in Tsakhur, and “unq’al” in Avar languages of Dagestan.

== Materials ==
Jorabs are made of wool, silk, nylon or sometimes cotton. Other materials include acrylic and blends of wool and cotton.

== Geography ==
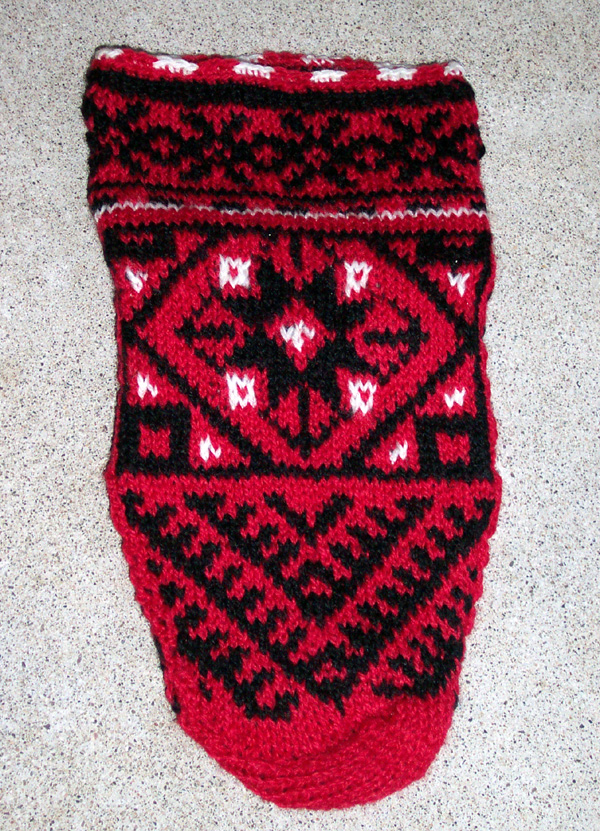
Jorabs with Bosnian toe

Jorabs are found in Central Asia (Turkmenistan, Tajikistan, and Afghanistan), Caucasus (Dagestan, Georgia, Azerbaijan, and Armenia) as well as in Iran and the mountainous areas of Pakistan. They are also known in the Balkan countries: Albania, Bosnia, Bulgaria, Greece, Macedonia, Serbia, and Turkey.

== Shape ==
Jorabs can be knee-high, regular length, ankle-length, or made as slippers. An early predecessor of jorabs, a knee-high 12th century sock with toe-up construction and intricate patterns, was found in Egypt with possible origin in India.

== Tools ==
Jorabs are usually knitted with 5 double-pointed needles. Bosnian and in old Tajik socks feature a combination of knitting and crochet techniques. Tajik jorabs (Pamirs area) can be made by using crochet technique only. Some ethnic groups from the Caucasus knit jorabs with 3 double-pointed bow-shaped needles.
