= Arkhalig =

Traditional dress of the peoples of the Caucasus and Iran

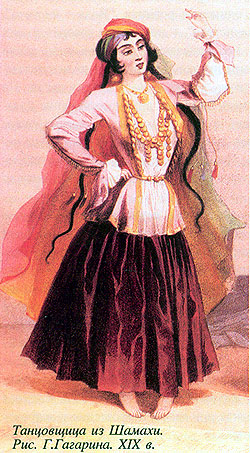
A 19th-century dancer from Shamakhi wearing an arkhalig

An arkhalig (Note: Armenian: արխալուղ, Azerbaijani: arxalıq, Georgian: ახალუხი, Persian: ارخالق) is part of both male and female traditional dress of the peoples of the Caucasus and Iran.

An arkhalig is a long tight-waist jacket made of various kinds of fabric, such as silk, satin, cloth, cashmere and velvet, traditionally depending on the social status of its owner. Male arkhaligs can be both single-breasted (done up with hooks) and double-breasted (done up with buttons). In cold weather, a chokha is put on above an arkhalig. Female arkhaligs are often ornamented and have tight long sleeves widening on the wrists. A female arkhalig can also include a fur list along the edges, patterned laces and braids, or be decorated with gold embroidery.

In the arkhalıq, there are true sleeves, either cut plain, or plain to the elbow and then slit as far as the wrist or, in the type called lelufar (Persian language, nīlūfar that means lily), flared from the elbow like the bell of a lily and trimmed with an extra 4 cm of lining from the inside.

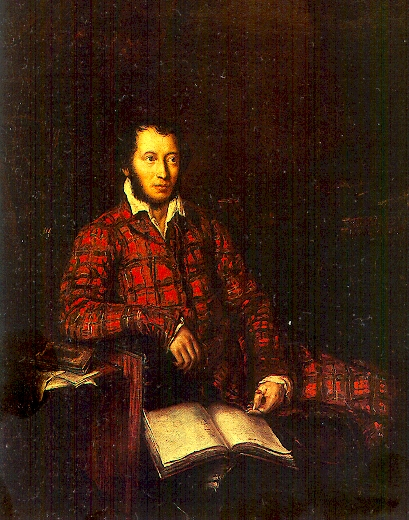
Pushkin in arhalyk, 1839

In the Russian Empire, named arkhaluk it was used as a men's casual road or house attire.
