= Pungcha =

Korean traditional winter hat

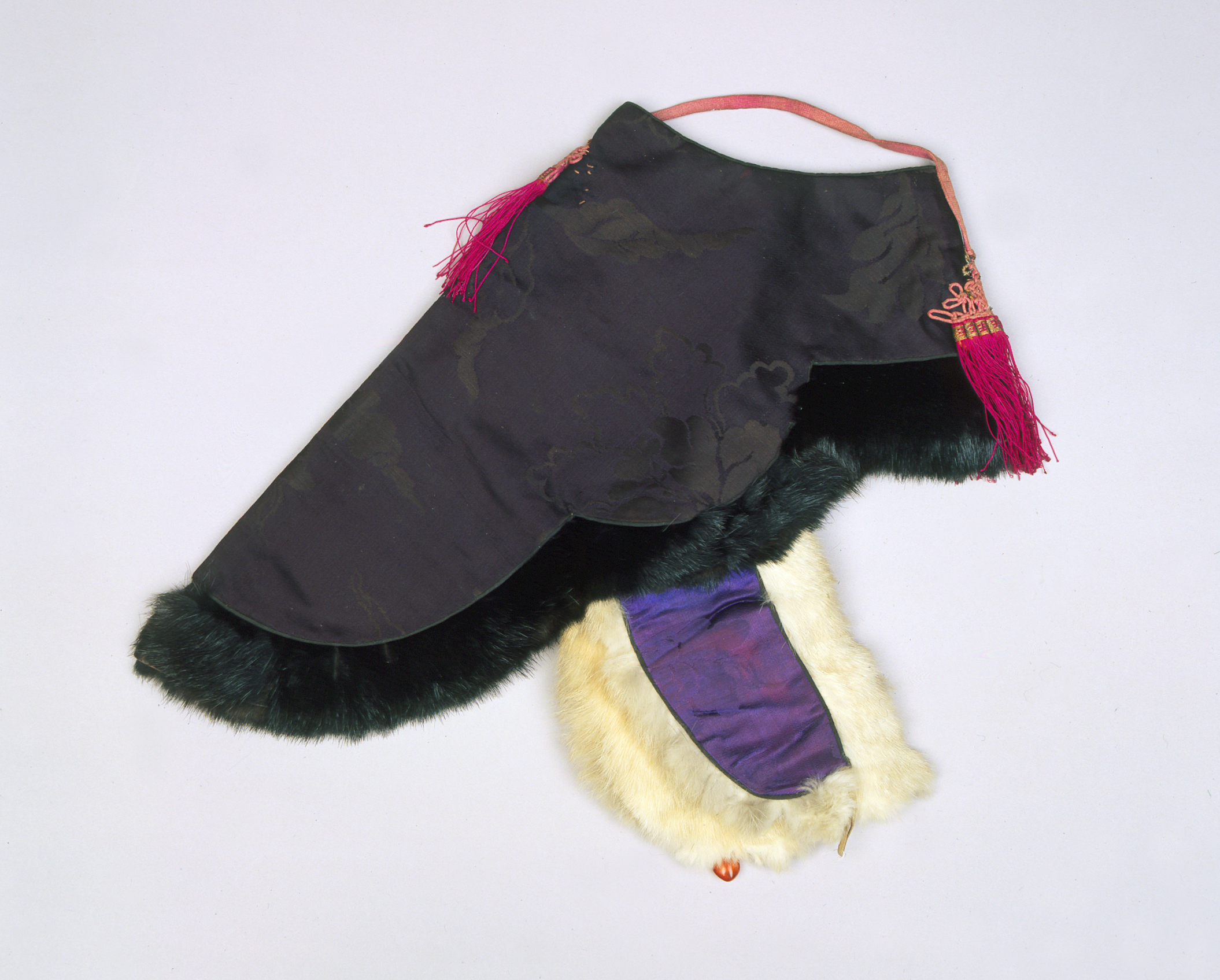

Korean name
- Hangul: 풍차; 풍채; 정풍차
- Hanja: 風遮
- RR: pungcha; pungchae; jeongpungcha
- MR: p'ungch'a; p'ungch'ae; chŏngp'ungch'a

A pungcha (Korean: 풍차) is a type of traditional Korean winter hat worn by both men and women during the Joseon period for protection against the cold. It is also called pungchae and jeongpungcha. Although its shape is very similar to nambawi, the pungcha has a bolkki (볼끼) attached on both sides of the ears. It was originally worn by males of yangban, the upper class but became to spread to commoners including women.

The pungcha is open on the top so that it does not cover the top of the head just like other winter caps such as nambawi, ayam, and jobawi. Whereas it fully covers the forehead, back and ears on the sides as well as cheeks by the bokki. The outer is generally made of a variety of silk called dan (단, 緞), wool and a fabric made from kudzu barks were used.

== See also ==
- Ayam
- Hanbok
- Hwagwan
- Jobawi
- Nambawi
- Tubeteika
