= Nambawi =

Traditional Korean winter hat worn during the Joseon dynasty

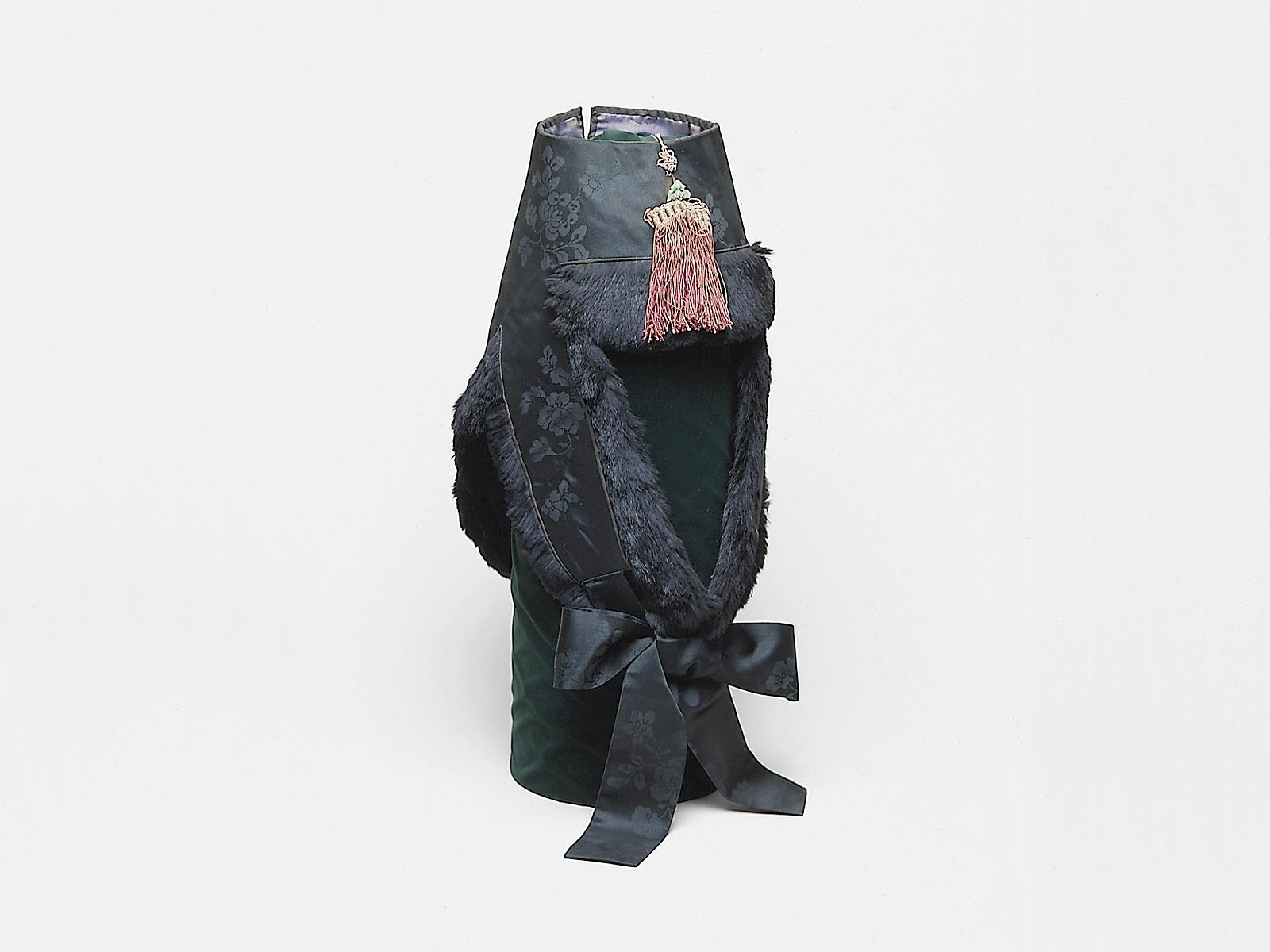

Korean name
- Hangul: 남바위; 풍뎅이; 난이; 이엄
- Hanja: (none); (none); 暖耳; 耳掩
- RR: nambawi; pungdengi; nani; ieom
- MR: nambawi; p'ungdengi; nani; iŏm

A nambawi (Korean: 남바위) is a type of traditional Korean winter hat worn by both men and women during the Joseon period for protection against the cold. The other names for it are pungdengi and nani (literally warming ears). The nambawi is also called ieom (literally "covering ears") which was worn in the early Joseon period, although it was derived from the cap. It was originally worn by the upper class as a daily hat, but spread to commoners and women in the later period. It was usually worn by middle-aged women and old people as well as by government officers who put it under the samo (사모, official hat).

The nambawi is open on the top so that it does not cover the top of the head just like other winter caps such as the ayam and the jobawi, both of which were actually adapted from it, whereas it fully covers the forehead, back and ears on the sides to provide warmth against the cold. The overall shape of the side is curved in three phases. The edge of the nambawi is bordered with 4 to 7 cm of fur, which was usually marten leather. It has a long back flap for the back of the neck and earflaps on both sides which cover the ears. Sashes made of silk are attached to the ear flaps so they can be tied under the chin to hold the hat tightly in place. The outer is generally made of a variety of silk called dan (단, 緞) but sometimes wool and cotton were used. The inner is made of flannel and sometimes wool as well.

The common color for the outer fabric was black, while for the inner, black, green, or red were used. Sometimes dark blue, purple, maroon, light violet, light green were used for the outer and a yellow colored fabric was used for the inner. The bordered fur was usually black, dark brown or dark blue in color, and the tassels were pink or a bright pink color. The nambawi for women were colorfully and luxuriously adorned with geumbak (gold leaf decoration) of cranes, butterflies, chrysanthemums, and phoenix or other auspicious patterns.

== Gallery ==
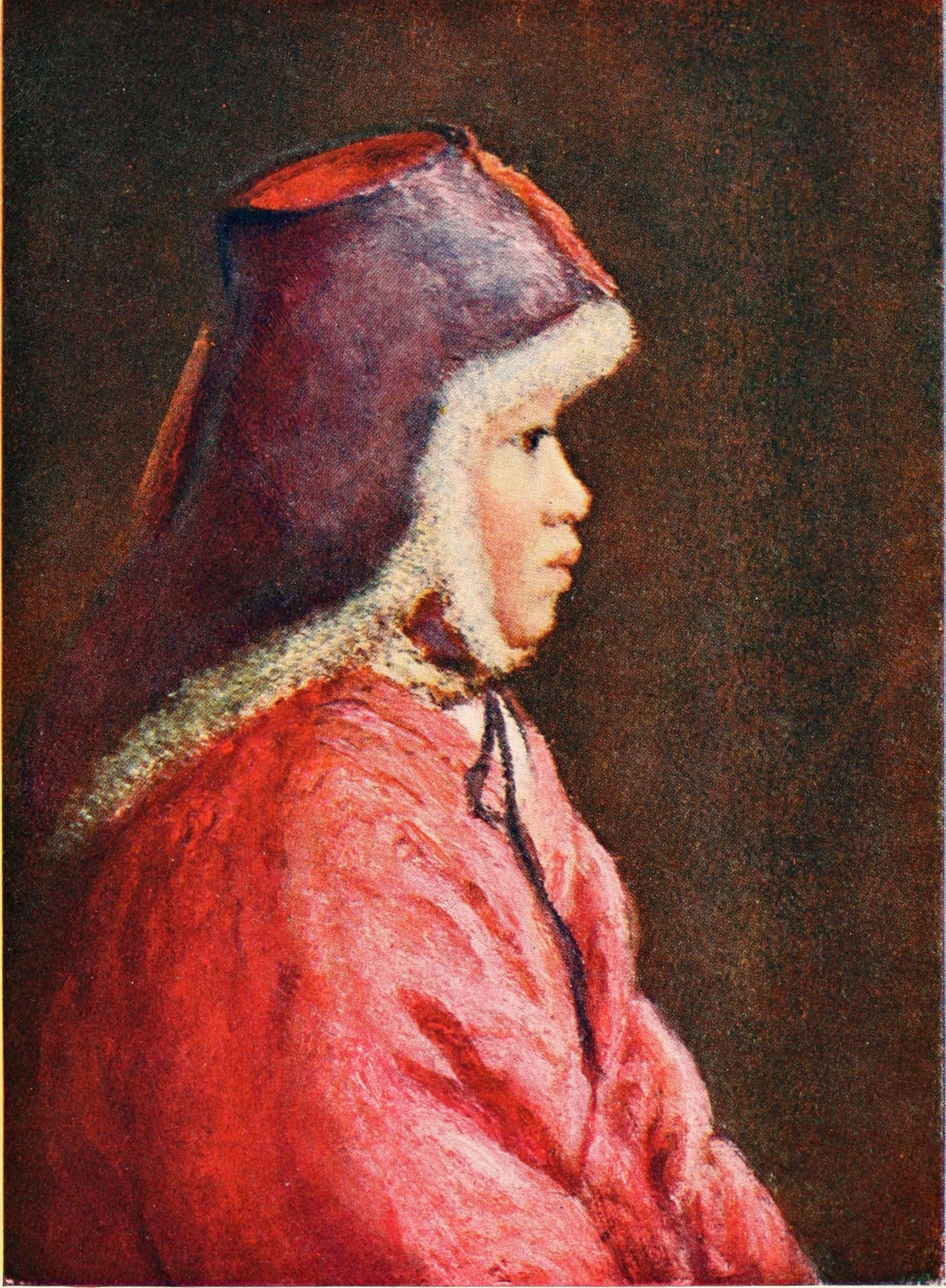

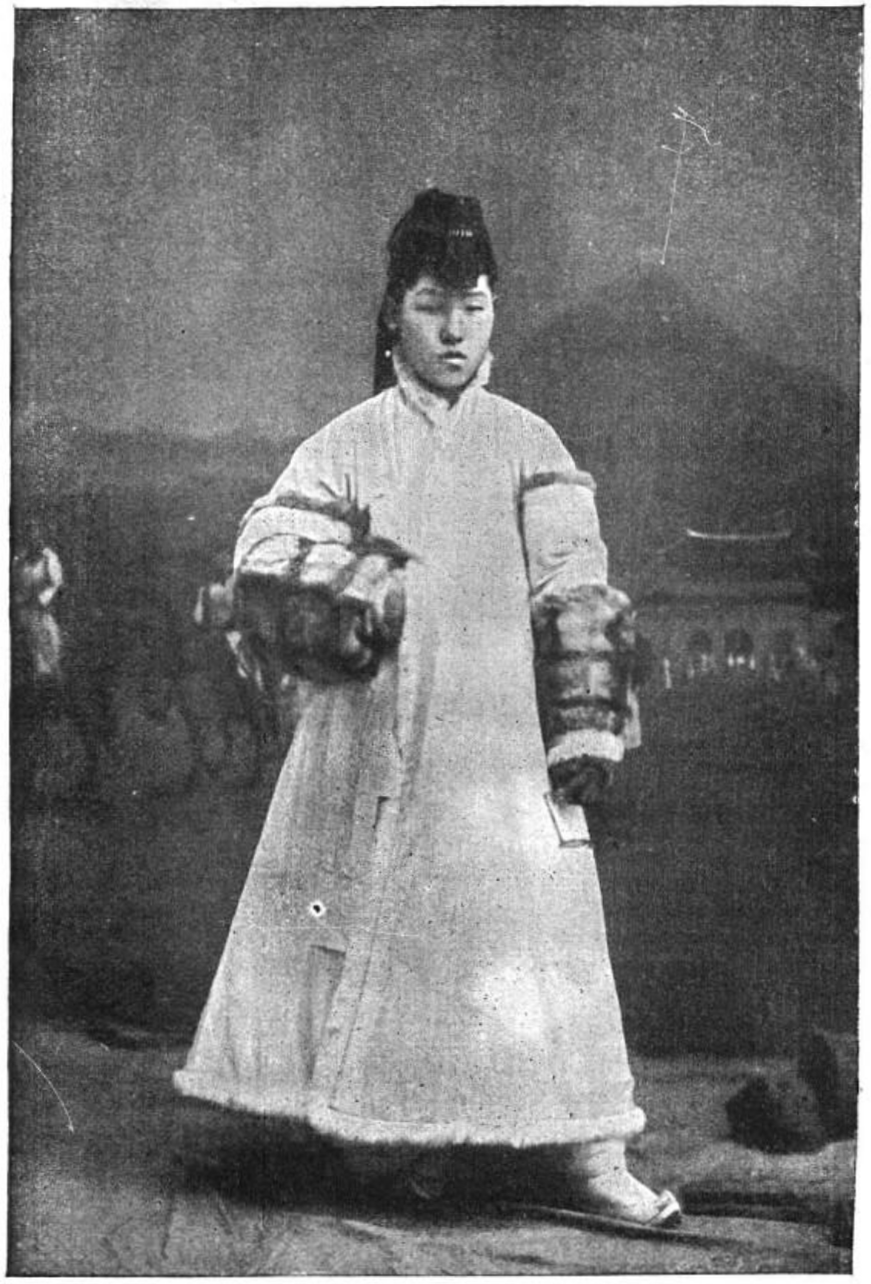

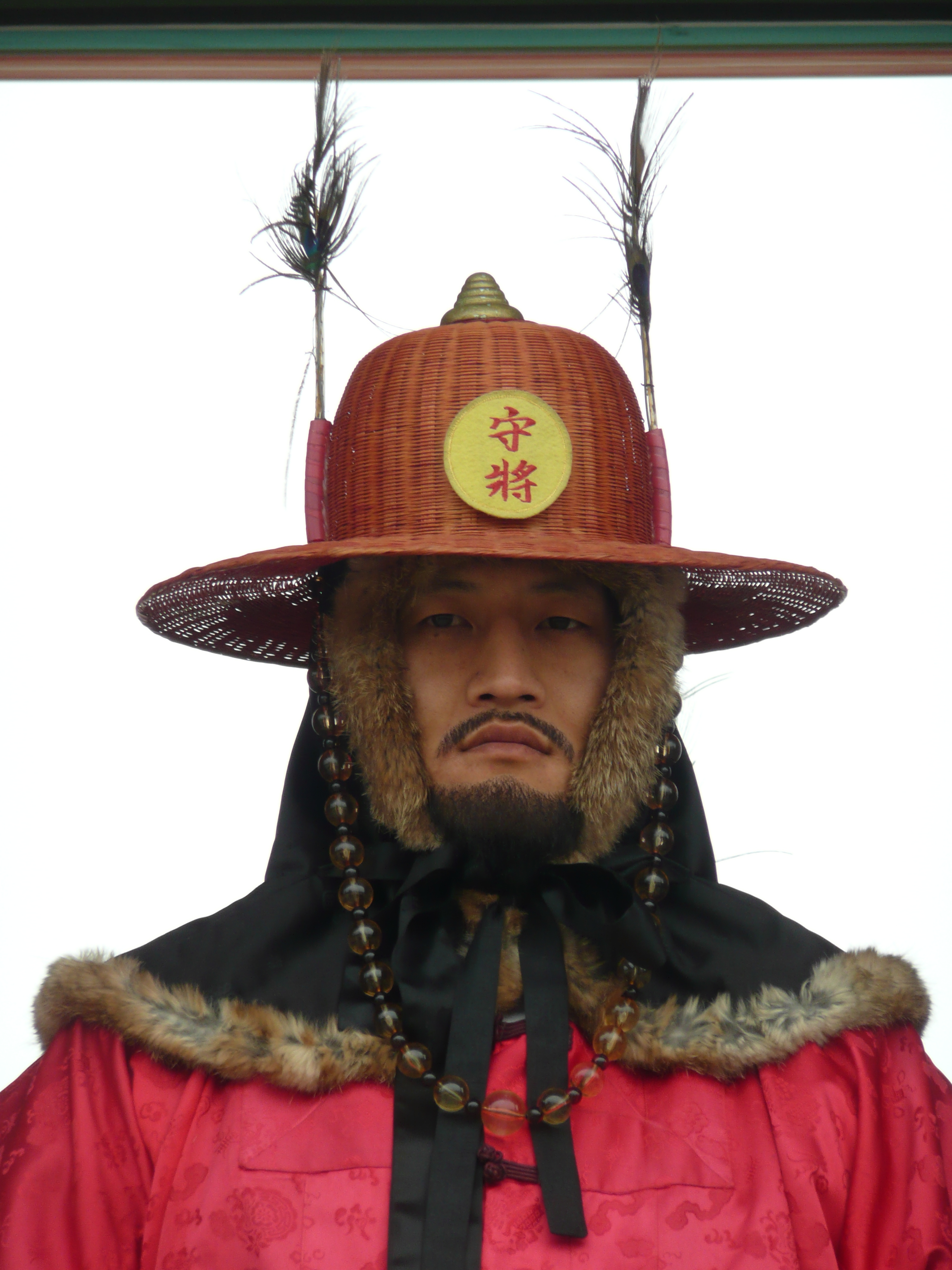
Nambawi worn under jurip (주립, a red hat) with feathers

== See also ==
- Ayam
- Jobawi
- Jokduri
- Hanbok
- Hwagwan
- Tubeteika
