= G'ova =

- Town
- Location within Uzbekistan
- Coordinates: 41°07′35″N 71°07′32″E
- Country: Uzbekistan
- Region: Namangan
- District: Chust
- Time zone: UTC+05:00 (CST)
- Area code: +998

G'ova (Russian: Гава) is a town belonging to the Chust District of the Namangan Region of the Republic of Uzbekistan. In 2009, it was given the status of a town. Gova is located in the north of the district, 18 km from the district center. It borders with Koktash village of Ola Bukha district of Jalalabad region of the Kyrgyz Republic from the north, Varzik from the east, Karkidon from the south, Olmos towns from the southwest, and Pop district from the west.

The inhabitants of the town are mainly engaged in agriculture, cattle breeding, and beekeeping. There are 5 community gatherings in the town: Yukori, Govasay sohili, Yangi hayot, Tinchlik and Varzigon.
