= Sobira Kholdorova =

- Born: 1907; Chust, Namangan, Uzbekistan
- Died: 1 August 1981; Tashkent, Uzbekistan
- Citizenship: Soviet Union
- Education: Moscow Higher Institute of Journalism
- Occupation: Journalist
- Spouse: Momin Usmonov
- Children: 2

Sobira Kholdorova (Uzbek Latin: Sobira Xoldorova, Uzbek Cyrillic: Собира Холдорова, Russian: Собира Холдарова; 1907, Chust, Uzbekistan – 1 August 1981) was the first female Uzbek journalist who became a victim of repression.

== Biography ==
Sobira Kholdorova was born in 1907 in the city of Chust, Namangan, in a poor peasant family. When she was orphaned by her father when she was young, her mother returned to her father's house. Sobira Kholdorova grows up under the care of her uncle. However, after her uncle died in 1918, she was adopted by a distant relative. Later, the underage girl is married off to an older man. Sobira, who did not agree to her marriage, was beaten and locked in a barn by her husband. Sobira ran away from there. The police officers who found her handed her over to children's boarding school No. 5 in Kokand. Sobira Kholdorova studied at a boarding school and learned the Russian language. She surprised her teachers with her talent. In 1923, she came to Tashkent and studied at the Women's Educational Institute for two years. Later, she studied at the Higher Institute of Journalism in Moscow. During her student years, she married Momin Usmanov from Kokand. Her son Polat was born in Moscow.

After returning to Tashkent, she worked in the editorial offices of several newspapers and magazines. In 1937, she was imprisoned on charges of "communicating with bourgeois elements, losing consciousness." In October 1937, she became mentally ill as a result of physical torture, such as starvation, dehydration, and sleep deprivation. On 5 December 1940, she was exiled to Yakutia for 10 years. He husband, Momin Usmanov was shot on 4 October 1938. After the court verdict on exile, her children Polat and Manzura were transferred to the orphanage.

Sobira Kholdorova returned from prison in 1955. After that, she wrote an application in the name of Nikita Khrushchev, the First Secretary of the Central Committee of the CPSU of the USSR. In it, she talks about her experiences, her difficult fate, and her rejection of the slanders made during the investigation. Rejecting the accusations, the dependent informs that she was exiled in Yakutia and spent several years in a psychiatric hospital. On 22 June 1956, it was announced that she was acquitted. On 12 November 1956, her husband Momin Usmanov was posthumously acquitted.

Sobira Kholdorova suffered from mental illness until the end of her life. She died on 1 August 1981.
