= Jobawi =

Traditional Korean winter cap for women

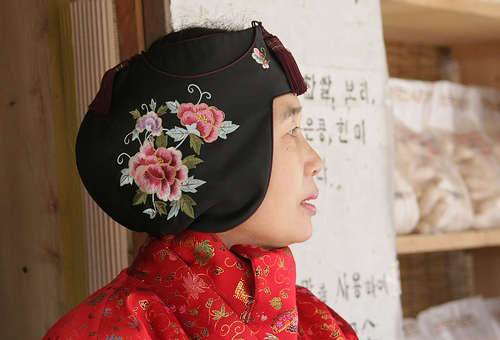
- A jobawi worn by a woman near Korean Folk Village

Korean name
- Hangul: 조바위
- RR: jobawi
- MR: chobawi

A jobawi (Korean: 조바위) is a type of traditional Korean winter cap with earflaps which was worn by women and was made of silk. Since its first appearance in the late Joseon period, it has been widely worn as a substitute for the ayam (a cap with a big ribbon on the back). Although the jobawi was worn by the upper class as well as by commoners, it was mostly used by the yangban aristocracy of that time as a decorative headgear when they went out. In addition, the jobawi was worn not only as formal headgear, but also for special occasions. Even though a wearer was not in formal attire, if she wore a jobawi, the overall outfit could be considered as simple formal clothing.

The jobawi does not cover the top of the head just like other unisex winter caps such as the ayam, nambawi and the pungcha. But it fully covers the forehead and the ears on the sides with round earflaps to protect against the cold. The outer surface is generally made of several varieties of silk called sa (사, 紗) or dan (단, 緞) while its inner surface is made of dan, myeongju (명주, more lustrous silk), or cotton.

Tassels are attached to both front and back side of the jobawi; they can also be adorned with jewelry. Some jobawi were decorated with accessories made from silver, jade, agate or other gems on the left and right side of the forehead as well as on the bottom part of the back side. The front and back of the jobawi's top are loosely linked by a string which either consists of coral beads or is made of silver strings in a floral or simple braid.

There were jobawi embroidered with beads or adorned with geumbak (gold leaf decoration) which were usually worn by children or young females. The patterns of the geumbak were usually flowers or letters in hanja reading bugwi (부귀, 富貴, wealth and honors), danam (다남, 多男, many sons), subok (수복, 壽福, long life and happiness), or gangnyeong (강녕 康寧, happiness and peace). This decoration was on the edge of the jobawi. At present, baby girls wear such jobawi on the occasion of their doljanchi, which celebrates their first birthday.

== See also ==
- Ayam
- Hanbok
- Hwagwan
- Mob cap
- Nambawi
- Pungcha
