= Doppa =

Skullcap worn by Uyghurs and Uzbeks

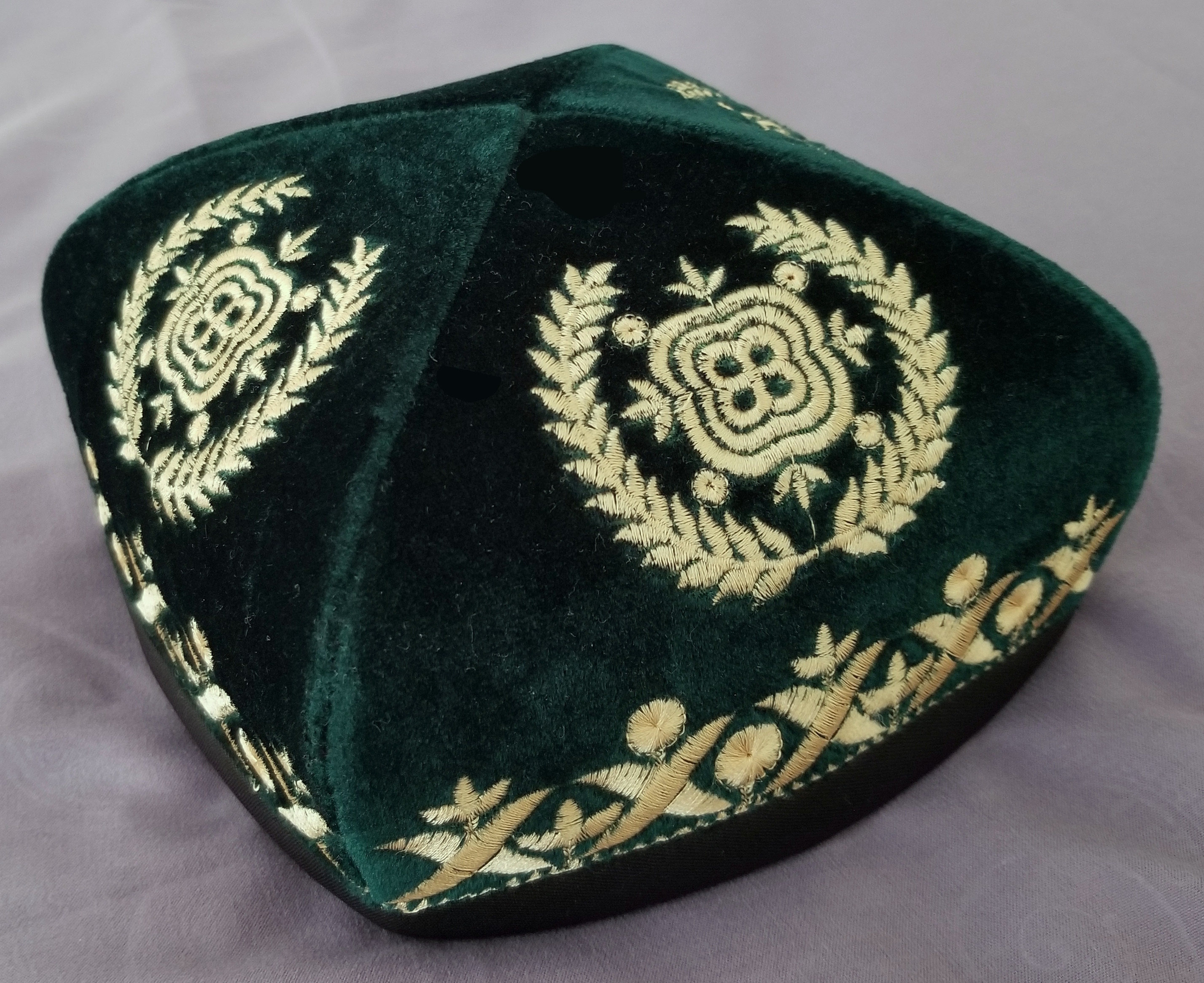

Uyghur name
- Uyghur: دوپپا
Transcriptions
- Latin Yëziqi: doppa
- Yengi Yeziⱪ: doppa
- SASM/GNC: doppa
- Siril Yëziqi: доппа

Uzbek name
- Uzbek: doʻppi / дўппи / دوپا

The doppa, doppi or duppi is a traditional square or round skullcap worn by the related Uyghur and Uzbek peoples of Central Asia. It is one of many Turkic skullcaps categorised under the Russian umbrella term tubeteika, and its written history has been attested to since at least the 19th century.

Doppas have intricate, embroidered designs that symbolise elements of the wearer's background. There are several types of doppas distinguished by their embroideries or place of origin, but there is no agreed-upon standard of classification.

The doppa is culturally significant to the Uyghurs and Uzbeks, and is the national headwear of the two peoples. The Uyghur Doppa Cultural Festival, held every year on 5 May, celebrates Uyghur culture and history, with the doppa as the symbolic centerpiece.

== Description ==
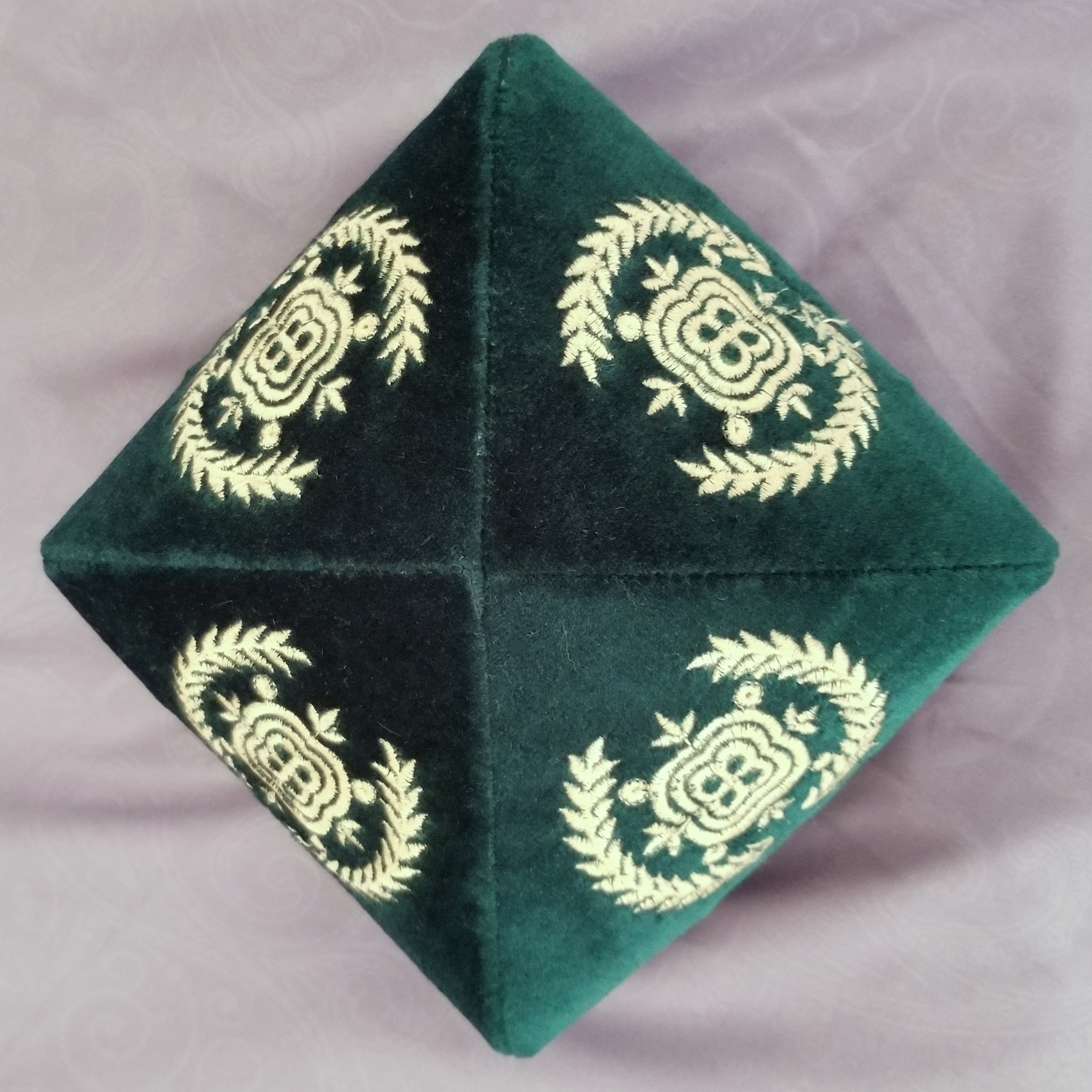
Top-down view of a square doppa

The doppa is a square or round skullcap decorated with embroidery and beads. It is worn by men, women, and children of all ages. The doppa is one of several skullcaps worn by the Turkic peoples of Eurasia that first emerged in the 13th century through contact between the Iranic and Turkic peoples. These skullcaps are generally known as tubeteika, a Russian word derived from the Turkic word tyube, meaning "top". The skullcaps convey different meanings through their varying styles, colours, sizes, and decorations. Designs may indicate the wearer's gender, hometown, ethnicity, religion, martial status, social status, wealth, or occupation.

== History ==
The earliest depictions of the doppa can be found in 15th-century art from present-day Uzbekistan. Miniature drawings from this time showed women and girls wearing round skullcaps with embroidered edges.

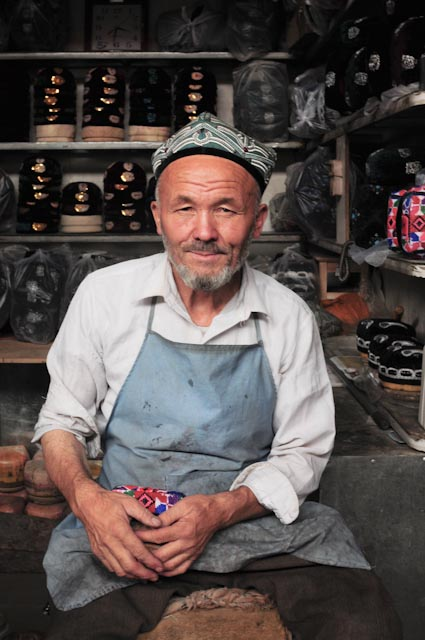
A Uyghur doppa maker in his shop in Kashgar, Xinjiang

Written histories of the Uyghurs by Uyghur scholars did not emerge until a period of increased interest between 1880 and 1930, encouraged by European outsiders amid the Great Game between the British and Russian empires. Furthermore, at the time, only Uyghur men wrote or kept records, and so the women-dominated practice of embroidery was overlooked. Consequently, one of the earliest written records of the doppa worn by Uyghurs is an 1871 account by British explorer Robert Barkley Shaw of his two-year captivity in Kashgar on the orders of Yakub Beg of Yettishar. Shaw was one of the first Britons to visit Kashgar and wrote in detail about the local populace and their customs. He wrote of gifts he had received from them, including "a skull-cap such as they all wear under their own" and other embroidered items, such as purses and winter robes.

Catherine Macartney, wife of the British consul in Kashgar George Macartney, stayed in the city with her husband for over two decades, starting in 1898. She observed that the doppa was worn by all locals, all the time:

[T]hey always wear a cap of some description, it being considered rather a disgrace to be seen with the head uncovered: men, women, and children and even small babies sleep with their caps on. The caps are made of velvet, lined and edged with fur for winter, while small embroidered skull caps are worn in summer.

She described the doppas as "bright coloured velvet caps of every hue, some lined and trimmed with fur for winter, others gaily embroidered for summer wear". George Macartney went on home leave in 1915 and was relieved by Percy Sykes, who subsequently lived in Kashgar with his sister Ella Sykes for six months. Ella noted that the colourful embroideries of the Uyghurs mentioned by Shaw and Macartney had nearly disappeared by the time of her and her brother's stay, excluding the doppa.

== Cultural significance ==
Doppas and other embroideries in Uyghur culture have traditionally been handmade by women using natural dyes. Doppas are passed down from generation to generation, and their intricate designs represent details about the wearer. The Uyghur Doppa Cultural Festival, or simply Doppa Day, is a celebration of Uyghur culture and history that is held every year on 5 May. It was conceptualised in 2009 (Note: Amerasinghe 2024 gives the year as 2010.) by activist and businessman Tahir Imin.

In Uzbekistan, the doppa is the national headwear and has several geographical variants. Uzbeks living in cities generally wear the doppa only on special occasions, such as family celebrations, funerals, and holidays.

== Types ==
There is no system of categorisation for doppas that is universally accepted, and authors may distinguish doppas based on their embroideries, place of origin, or both.

Swedish diplomat and Turkologist Gunnar Jarring's 1992 publication Garments from Top to Toe is one of the few Western writings on the topic of doppa designs. It includes a translation of a Uyghur record from sometime between 1905 and 1910, which identifies four types of doppas: Andijan, Artush sapaqi, moza, and white. Andijan and Artush are cities in Uzbekistan and Xinjiang, China, respectively, while a sapaqi is a skullcap without lining, and a moza an octagonal one. The record does not mention the meaning of each design, nor if the doppas listed represent all the doppa types of the time or a particular selection of them.

Collection of the Uygur Folk Art Designs, (Note: Uygur is an alternative English spelling of Uyghur.) a 1992 book by Uyghur painter Ghazi Ehmet, features 54 doppa styles and names 14 doppa types: Badam, Bashtal (pentagon), Chinman (cumin), Dhiman, Gilham, Manchester, Manpur (or Manchurian), Marjian, Pahtagul (cotton flower), Shapk, Tashkent, Turpan, Yilma, and Zara. However, Ghazi also does not explain the meaning of the designs, nor their origins beyond geographical markers. In this regard, he only writes: "The designs are drawn from different plants, animals, landscapes, shapes and geometric figures."

In 1996, Uyghur collector Islamjan Qasimi published Uighur National Costum [sic], (Note: Uighur is an alternative English spelling of Uyghur.) a book about his personal collection of Uyghur cultural items that he amassed over four decades. In it, he identifies numerous common patterns among what he describes as uniquely Uyghur doppa designs, including gül yopurmaq (leaf of the flower), yopurmaq (leaf), curn yopurmuk (connected leaves of flowers), arnar (pomegranate), arnagool (pomegranate flower), budum (almond), and goolbudum (almond flower). Islamjan explains that Uyghur doppa designs focus on the natural world because of "its inexhaustible source for colour". He identifies 19 kinds of doppa: Altun Taje Kash, Beck, Budum, Chyman, Gilyam, Gilyam Taje, Golden Cuduk, Kashgar tolyma, Marvait, Munphu, Posma, Salla (turban), Sedap, Sharpuck, Sydum, Sydum cuduk, Turpan and Kumul, Turpan tokulma, and Zar.

Ghazi and Islamjan's works are significant in that they are one of only a few Uyghur literary works and books that survived the Chinese authorities' persecution of Uyghurs from 2014 to 2020, a period so-called "the people's war on terror". In 2015, Uyghur scholars presented a conference paper titled A Brief Introduction on Uyghur Traditional Headwear, but it does not cite its sources and uses illustrations taken from Ghazi's 1992 work without credit. The paper identifies 13 doppa types in comparison to Ghazi's 14 and Islamjan's 19.

Uzbek doppas are classified by their place of origin. The most common doppa among Uzbek men is the Chust doppa, a black square skullcap lined with 16 ornamental arches that represent a fortress protecting the wearer.

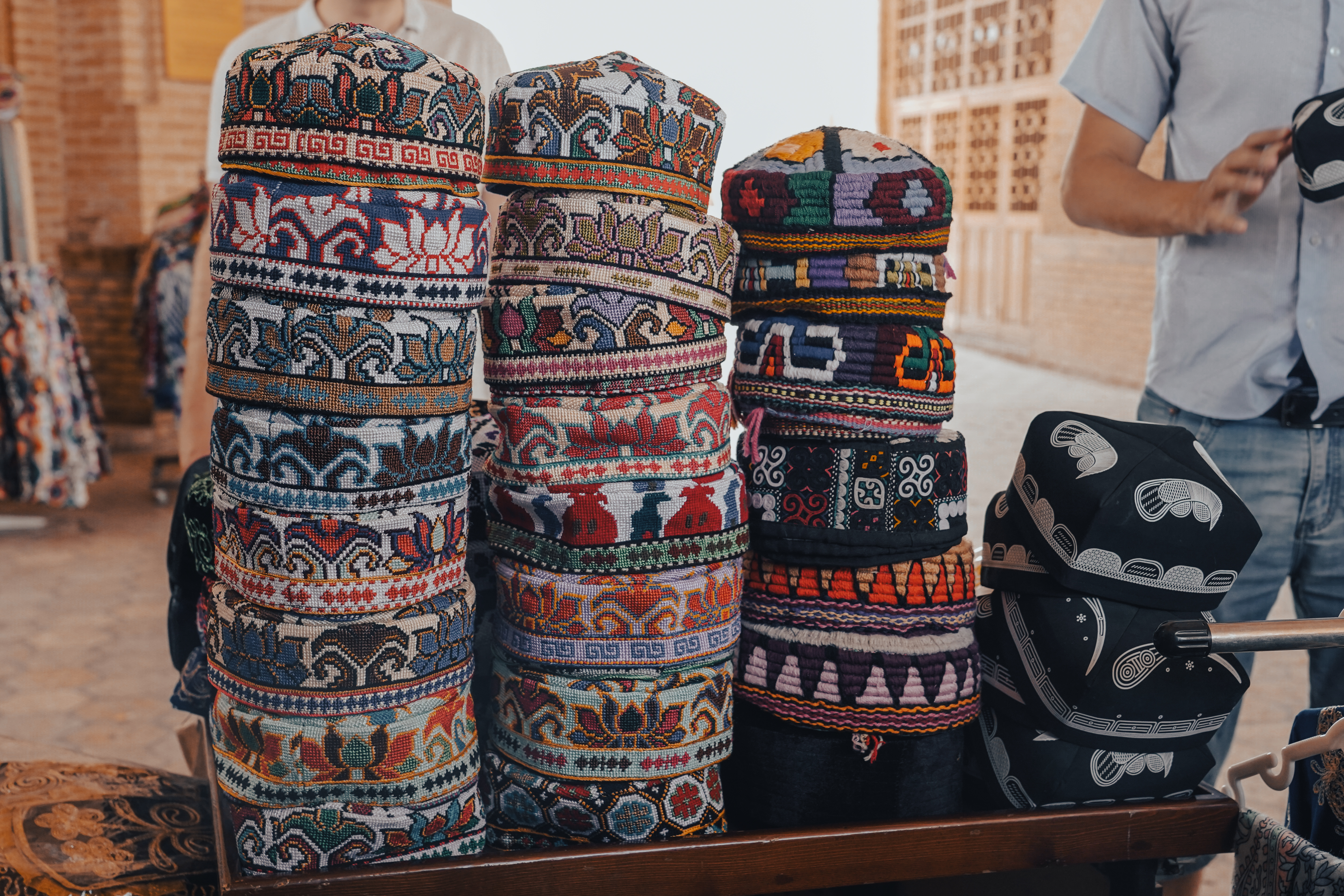
Doppas for sale in Bukhara, Uzbekistan. The first and second stacks are Shahrisabz doppas, the three on the top of the third stack are Surxon doppas, and the last stack are Chust doppas.

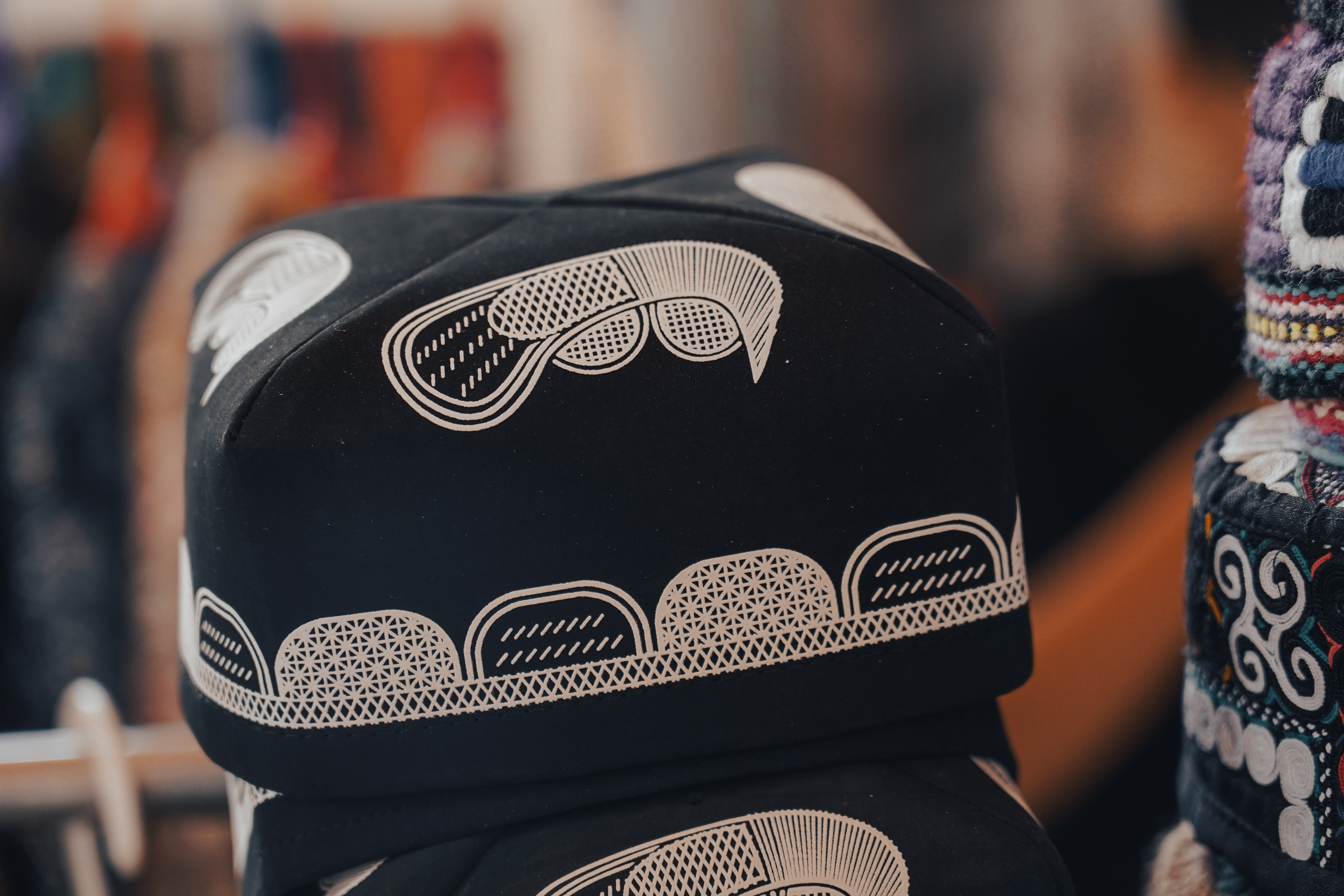
Close-up of the Chust doppa

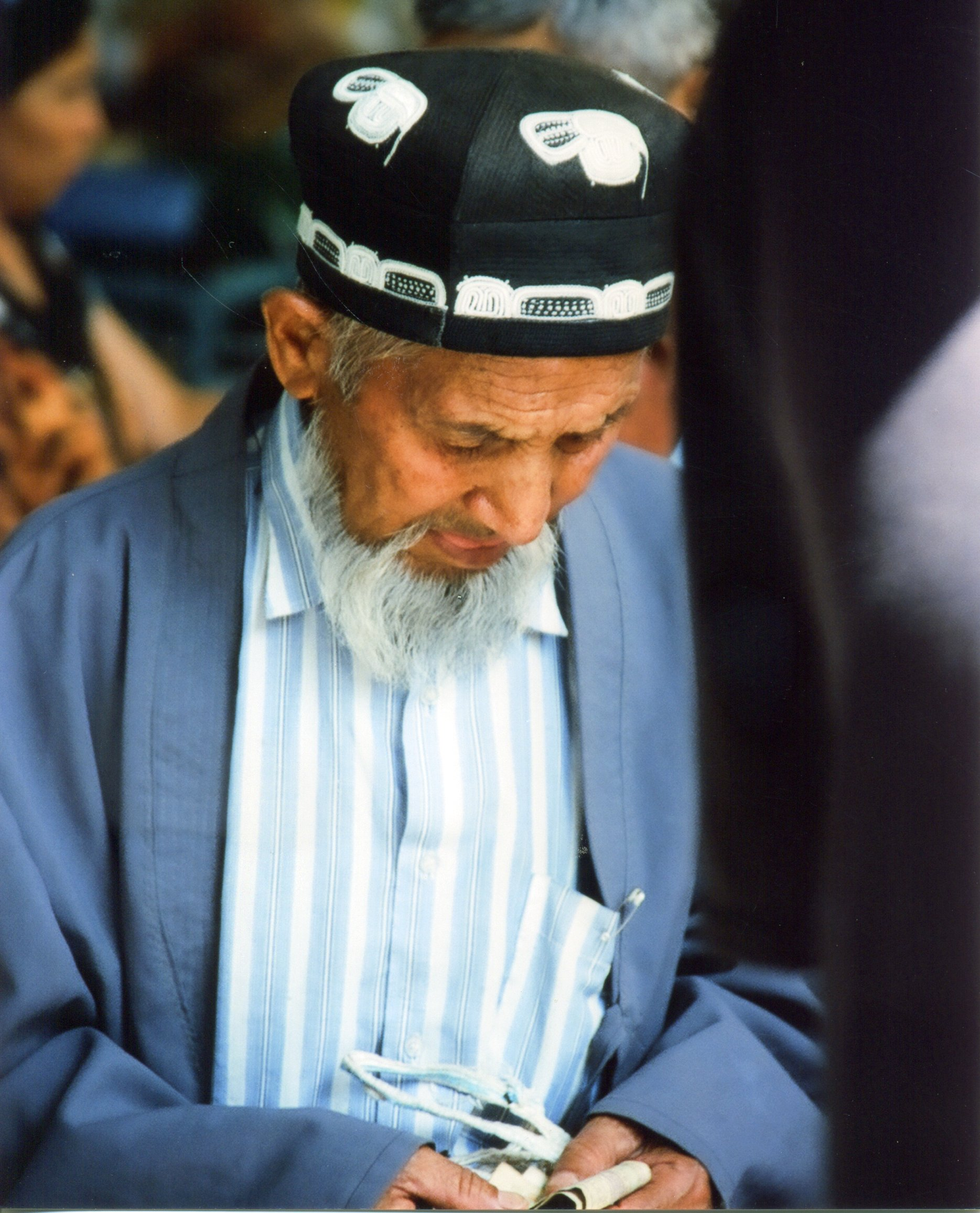
A man wearing a Chust doppa in Shahrisabz, Uzbekistan

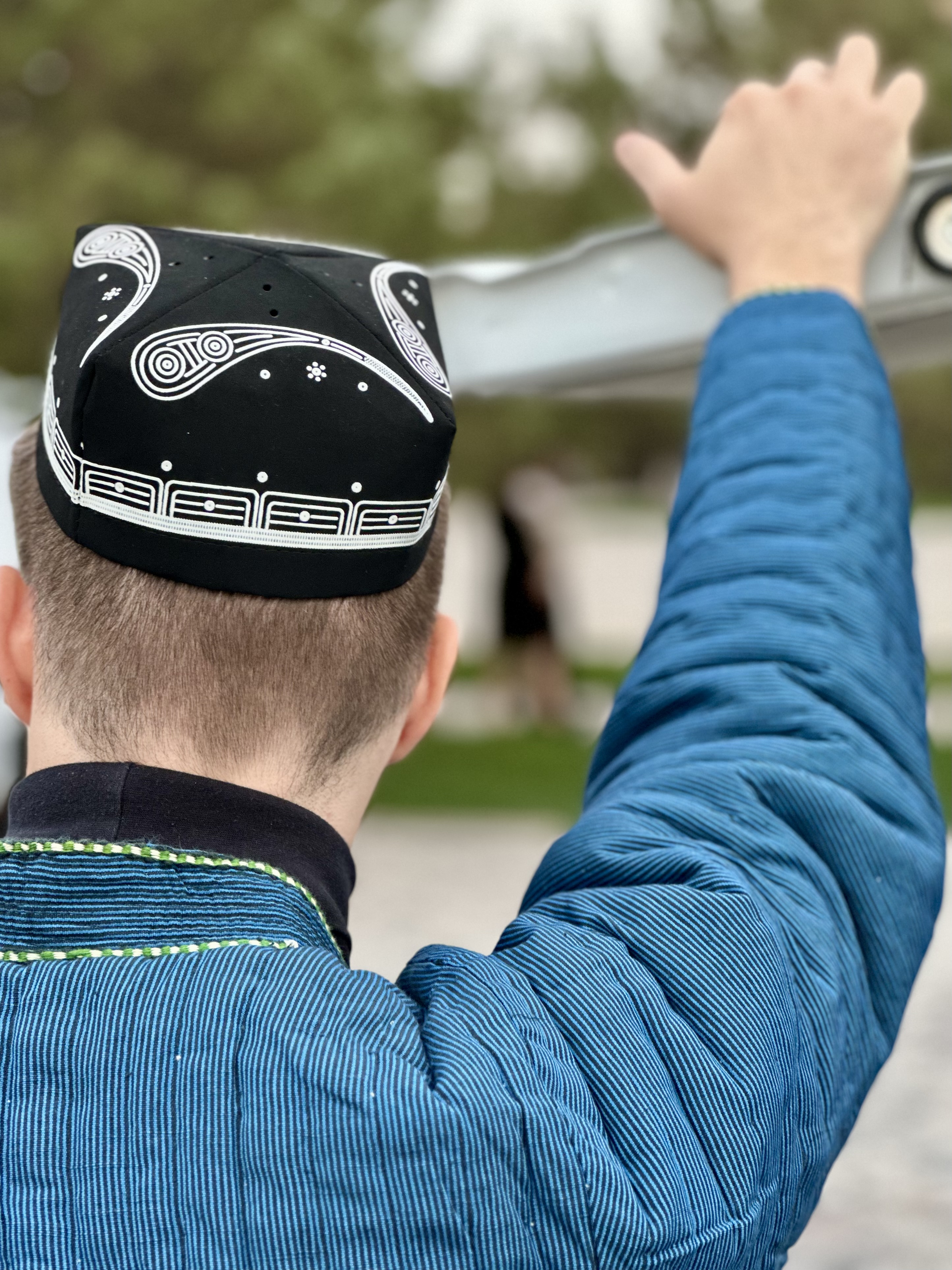
A man wearing a Chust doppa in Tashkent, Uzbekistan
