= Muhammadsharif Soʻfizoda =

- Born: 1869; Chust, Namangan, Russian Empire
- Died: 1937 (aged 67–68); Tashkent, Uzbek SSR, Soviet Union
- Occupations: Teacher, educator, writer, and scholar
- Writing career
- Literary movement: Jadidism

Muhammadsharif Soʻfizoda (1869–1937) was an Uzbek poet.

== Early life ==
Muhammadsharif Egamberdi Ogli was born on January 29, 1869, in Chust. His father was a knife maker. His neighbor Manzura taught him to read. From 1893 to 1898, he lived in Kokand and studied at a madrasa. He had a close relationship with poets Muqimi, Muhyi, Zavqi, and Nadim Namangani. His participation in Muqimi's circle developed into a school for the formation of the poet's worldview and the growth of his artistic skills. He used the pseudonym "Vahshiy" for his first poems on Muqimi's recommendation.

In 1893, in Chust, Soʻfizoda was accused of dahri and sentenced to death for his poems satirizing tsarist officials and bigots. The poet was forced to leave his homeland and live in other countries for 14 years.

== Works ==
In the 1890s, Soʻfizoda entered the literary circle. His lyrical ghazals such as "Gʼubor dardu olam", "O'pay", comedies such as "Dakanang", "Bedanang", poems about enlightenment such as "O‘zbek xonimiga", "Muslimalar", "Vatan", "Xonimlar isminda" gained him entry into Uzbek literature.

From 1900 to 1914, Soʻfizoda visited various cities of Central Asia, Tiflis, Baku, Arabia, India, and Turkey. He kept contact with newspapers published in Tashkent, Caucasus, Crimea, Orenburg, Turkeyand . His articles and poems were regularly published in Turkiston viloyati gazeti, Sadoyi Turkistan, Sadoyi Fergana.

In 1913, he returned to Chust from a trip abroad and opened a school of modern methods. In the village of Kamarsada, he organized "Dorulaytom" ("Orphanage Home") for orphans and an evening school for adults. In these schools, he taught subjects such as Uzbek and mathematics. In 1914, in Soʻfizoda, he published the poem "Chustilar bizlar", which exposed the socio-political and spiritual decay prevailing in Turkestan. The poem was a bitter irony against the "old-fashioned" fanatics.

After this conflict, Soʻfizoda was exiled from Chust. He opened a jadid school in Shahand village near Torakorgan.

In Soʻfizoda, he continued to serve his people during the period of the Shura government and was engaged in literary, creative and pedagogical activities. In 1937, the poet was declared a "public enemy" and imprisoned. The location of Soʻfizoda's grave is unknown.

On January 29, 1935, a jubilee was held in connection with the 55th anniversary of Soʻfizoda's birth, and more than 200 poems were collected for publication.

== Awards ==
- O‘zbekiston xalq shoiri (People's poet of Uzbekistan) (February 27, 1926)

== Legacy ==
- In Chust, a museum was established in Muhammadsharif Soʻfizoda;
- The children's library of Namangan region was named after Muhammadsharif Soʻfizoda;

== See also ==
- Abdurauf Fitrat
- Hamza Hakimzoda Niyoziy
- Choʻlpon
