= Uyghur Doppa Cultural Festival =

Cultural festival celebrated by Uyghurs

- Also called: Uyghur Doppa Day, Doppa Day
- Observed by: Uyghurs worldwide
- Date: 5 May
- Next time: 5 May 2027
- Frequency: Annual
- First time: 5 May 2009; 17 years ago
- Started by: Tahir Imin

Uyghur name
- Uyghur: ئۇيغۇر دوپپا مەدەنىيەت بايرىمى
Transcriptions
- Latin Yëziqi: Uyghur doppa medeniyet bayrimi
- Siril Yëziqi: Уйғур доппа мәдәнийәт байрими

Chinese name
- Simplified Chinese: 维吾尔花帽文化节
- Traditional Chinese: 維吾爾花帽文化節
Transcriptions
Standard Mandarin
- Hanyu Pinyin: Wéiwú'ěr huāmào wénhuà jié

Doppa Day
- Simplified Chinese: 花帽节 / 朵帕节
- Traditional Chinese: 花帽節 / 朵帕節
Transcriptions
Standard Mandarin
- Hanyu Pinyin: huāmào jié / duǒpà jié

The Uyghur Doppa Cultural Festival, (Note: Uyghur: ئۇيغۇر دوپپا مەدەنىيەت بايرىمى, romanized: Uyghur doppa medeniyet bayrimi; Chinese: 维吾尔花帽文化节; pinyin: Wéiwú'ěr huāmào wénhuà jié) observed annually on 5 May, celebrates the culture and history of the Uyghurs, a Turkic people originating from Xinjiang, China (historically known as East Turkestan). It is also known as Uyghur Doppa Day or just Doppa Day. (Note: simplified Chinese: 花帽节 / 朵帕节; traditional Chinese: 花帽節 / 朵帕節; pinyin: huāmào jié / duǒpà jié) The doppa is a traditional skullcap commonly worn by Uyghurs.

The festival was created by Uyghur activist Tahir Imin in 2009 and celebrated for the first time that year, in Imin's home city of Ürümqi. Celebrations were broadcast nationally by Chinese state television and shared by Uyghur groups abroad, popularizing it among Uyghurs in China and the Uyghur diaspora. However, since the start of the Chinese authorities' crackdown on Uyghur cultural activities in 2014, the festival is no longer officially observed in China.

== Background and history ==
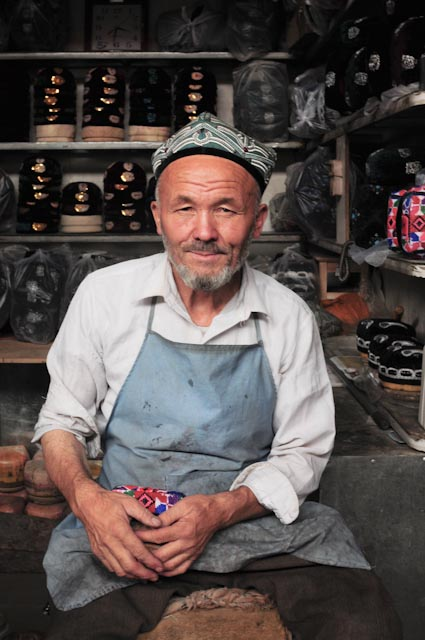
A Uyghur doppa maker in his shop in Kashgar

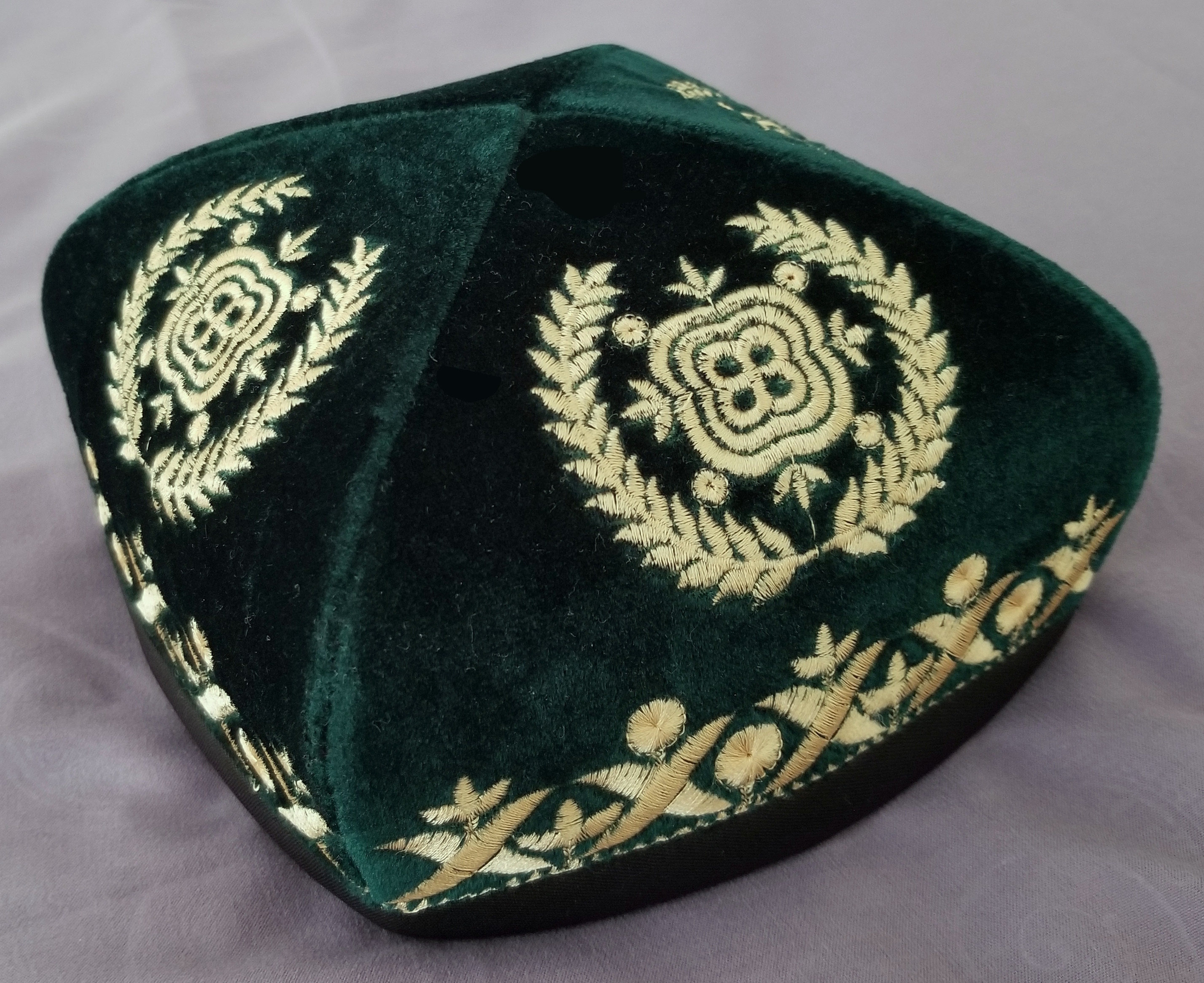
A square doppa

The doppa (Uyghur: دوپپا) is a skullcap traditionally worn by the Uyghur people. It is a symbol of Uyghur identity and history, with written records attesting to its widespread use among Uyghurs of all ages and genders dating back to at least the 19th century.

The Uyghur Doppa Cultural Festival was conceived of in 2009 (Note: Amerasinghe 2024 gives the year as 2010.) by Tahir Imin (تاھىر ئىمىن), a Uyghur activist from Ürümqi who had been imprisoned twice for his religious activities. It is a day meant to celebrate Uyghur culture and history, with the wearing of a doppa acting as a symbol of both.

The Chinese government was initially supportive of the festival. The inaugural celebration of the festival in Ürümqi in 2009 was broadcast nationally by the state-run China Central Television (CCTV) from Beijing. The state-run China Minzu News praised a spontaneous musical performance on 7 May 2010 by Uyghur students at Beijing Normal University who were celebrating the festival after classes. Similarly, the state-run China Daily celebrated Uyghurs' observance of the festival in the Chinese-majority city of Karamay in 2012. Additionally, in the previous year, the government of Kashgar Prefecture had organized a seminar on the festival in Yarkant County (Shache County). However, following the commencement of Chinese authorities' "Strike Hard Campaign Against Violent Terrorism" campaign in 2014, the festival is no longer officially observed in China.
