= Chust District =

Coordinates: 41.0000°N 71.2333°E

Chust
- District
- Chust tumani
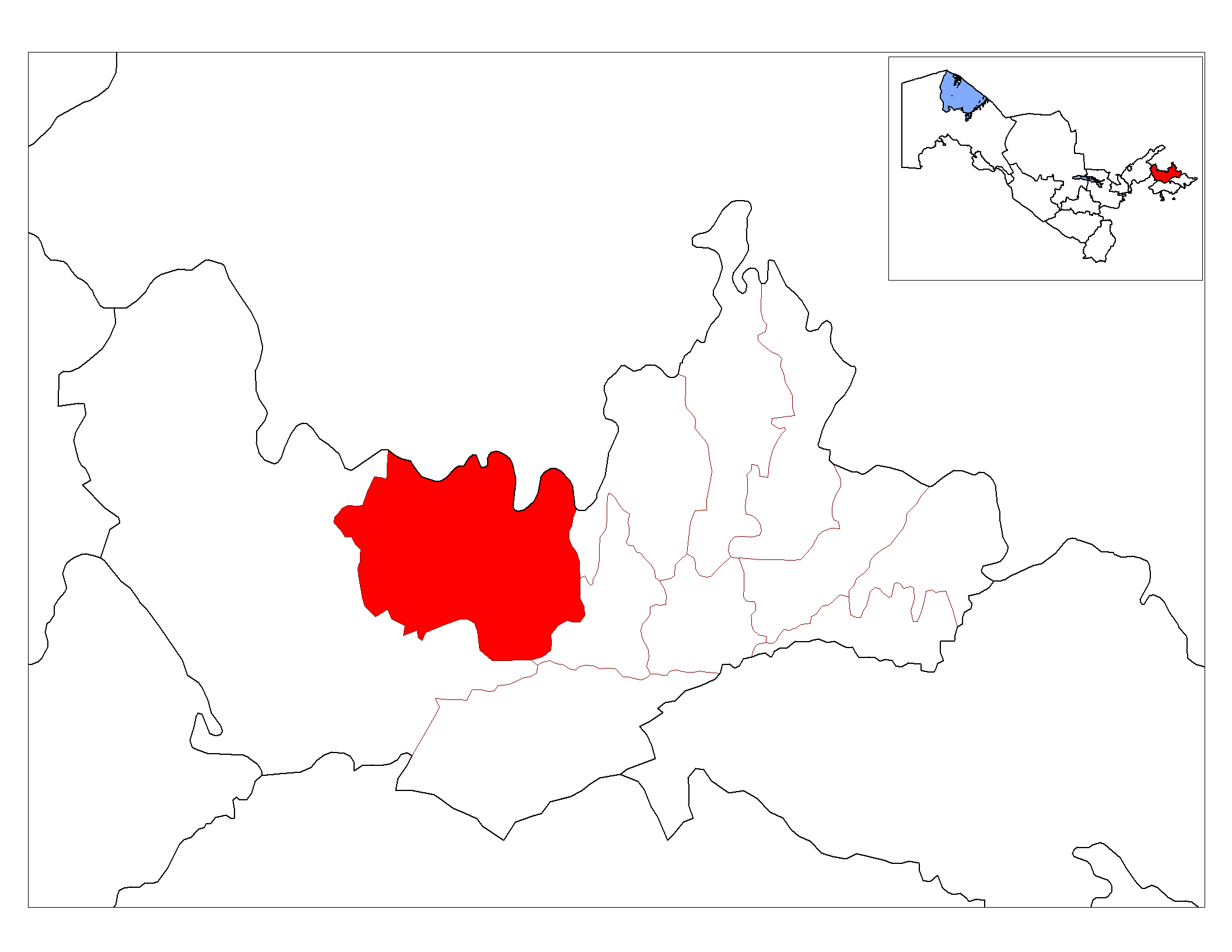
- Country: Uzbekistan
- Region: Namangan Region
- Capital: Chust
- Established: 1938

Area
  - Total: 937 km^{2} (362 sq mi)

Population (2021)
  - Total: 269,300
  - Density: 287/km^{2} (744/sq mi)
- Time zone: UTC+5 (UZT)

Chust is a district of Namangan Region in Uzbekistan. The capital is the city Chust. Its area is 937 km^{2}. Its population is 269,300 (2021 est.). The district consists of one city (Chust), eleven urban-type settlements (Olmos, Axcha, Sarimsoqtepa, Varzik, Qoraqoʻrgʻon, Gʻova, Karkidon, Karnon, Yorqishloq, Shoyon, Xisorak) and eleven rural communities.

Chust is one of the largest districts of Namangan region. Chust was founded on September 29, 1926.Chust District Nawabhor Mahalla is the largest settlement in Chust District. The chairman of this neighborhood is Bahadir Lukhmanov. Navbahor's neighboring neighborhoods are Chilonzor from the north, Gogi-Shamal from the west, Sabzazor from the south, and Bibiona from the east.
