= Ayam (cap) =

Korean traditional winter cap

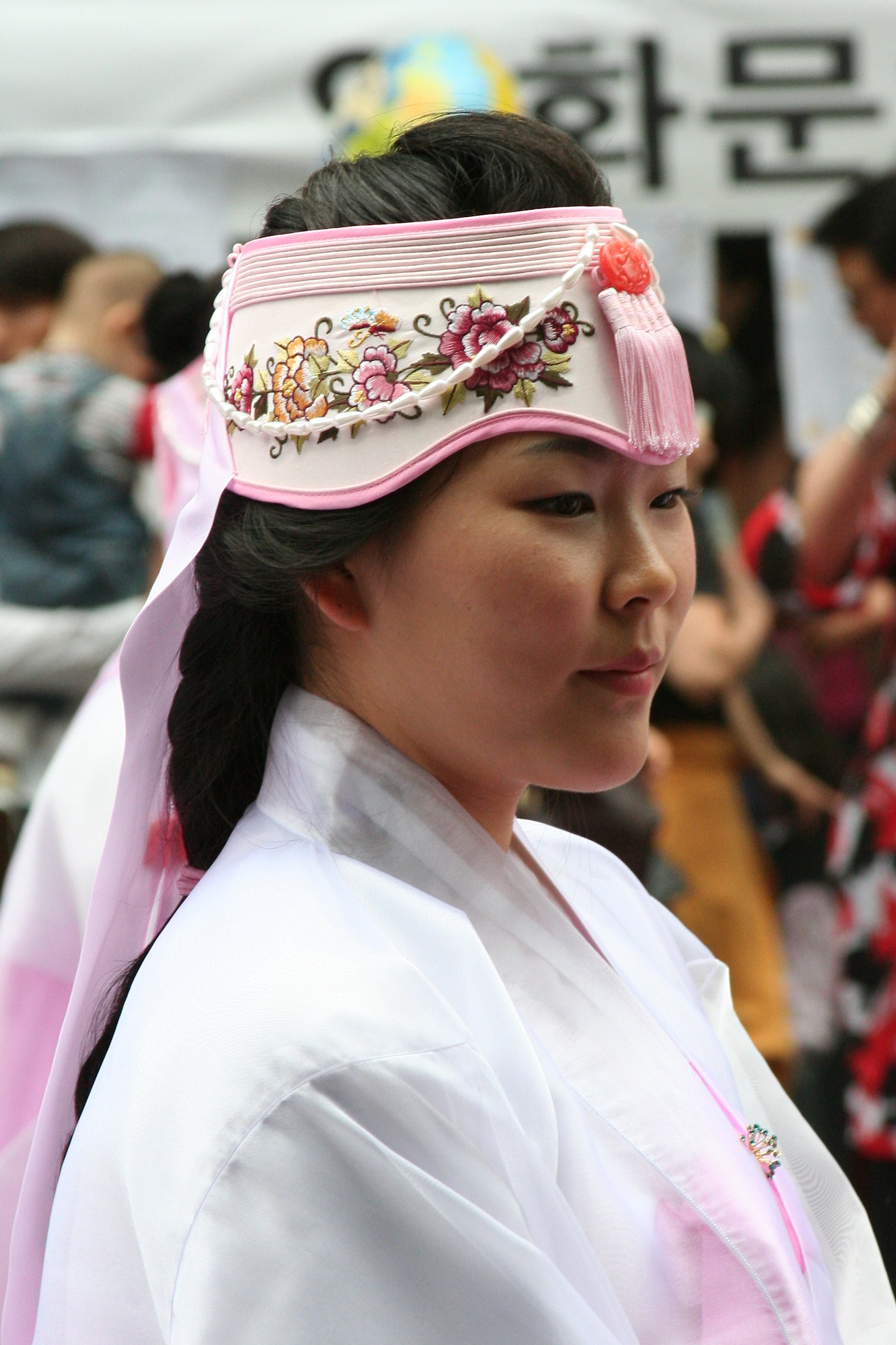
- Modernized ayam

Korean name
- Hangul: 아얌; 액엄
- Hanja: (none); 額掩
- RR: ayam; aegeom
- MR: ayam; aegŏm

An ayam (아얌) is a Korean traditional winter cap mostly worn by women in the Joseon period (1392 – 1910) for protection against the cold. It is also called aegeom which literally means "covering a forehead" in Korean. There is a historical record which mentions that officials in a low class called iseo (Korean: 이서; Hanja: 吏胥) wore ayam in the early Joseon period, so it was a unisex cap. However, it is not clear whether the shape at that time was identical to that of the later period. During the late Joseon period, an ayam was usually worn by female commoners. Especially in the western part of Korea, kisaeng (female Korean entertainers) commonly wore an ayam, and they were also worn as a simple formal headgear.

== Composition ==
The ayam generally consists of mobu (모부, a crown) and deurim (드림) which are shaped like daenggi (댕기) or a big ribbon. The upper 4–5 cm part of the mobu is finely quilted, the vertical line of the front shorter than the back's. On the bottom edge, the front part is more curved than the back. In addition, the vertical lines of the front and back are a little curvy, so that, when wearing an ayam, it fits well to one's head. Black or purple silk is used for the upper quilted part of the outer fabric, while black or dark brown fur is used for the rest of the mobu. The fabric for the inner is red cotton flannel.

The tassel attached to the upper center of both front and back is mostly red in color and the strings connected from both sides are all flat braids. However, some ayam worn by kisaeng were very luxuriously adorned with big and sumptuous jewels, such as jade, amber, or orpiment, on the tassels of both sides.

There are two types of deurim hung on the back of ayam. One is made with two sheets of fabric in a 9–10 cm width which are linked together lightly. The other is made of one sheet of fabric in an 18–20 cm width, with the center folded. On the center line of the deurim are decorations of jade, amber, and others gems, and the length is usually over 100 cm. The ayam worn for spring and autumn has the same shape as the one for winter, but it is made of a lighter silk.

== Expression ==
The Korean expression "ayang tteolda (아양떨다)" which means to flatter or to perform aegyo to look cute around the people, originated from the act of shaking the "ayam".

== See also ==
- List of hat styles
- Hanbok
- Hwagwan
- Jokduri
- Jobawi
- List of Korean clothing
- Mob cap
- Tubeteika
