= Geumbak =

Korean traditional gold craft

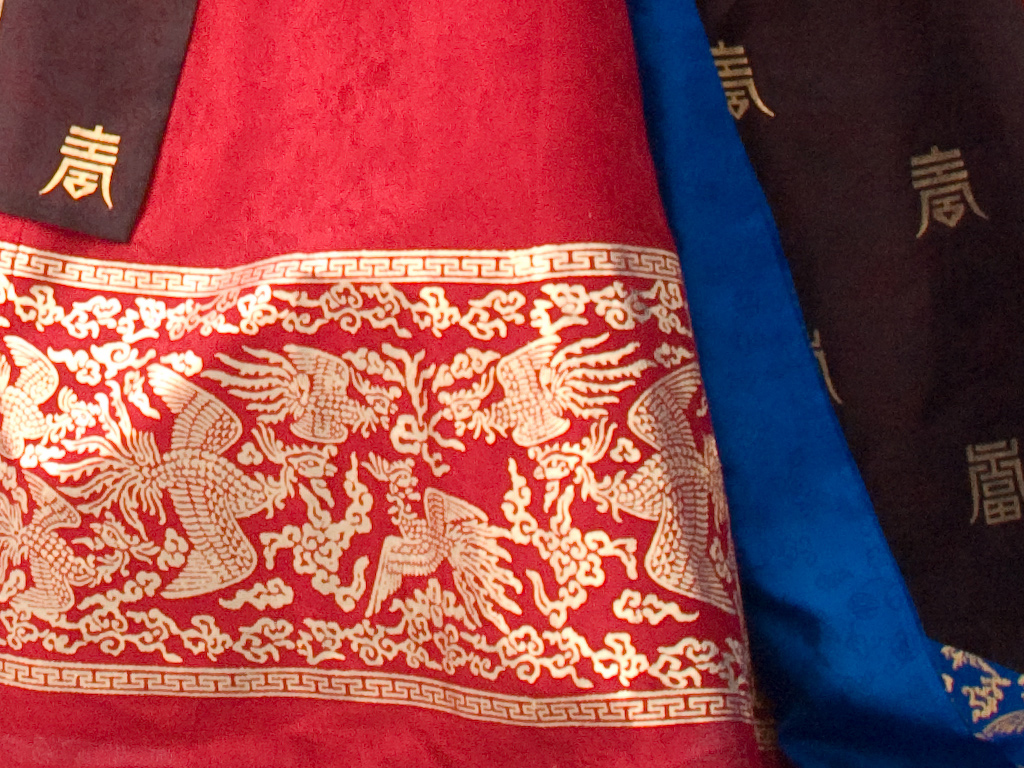

Korean name
- Hangul: 금박
- Hanja: 金箔
- RR: geumbak
- MR: kŭmbak

Geumbak (Korean: 금박) is a Korean traditional art for applying extremely thin gold leaf on hanbok, or other fabrics for decoration. Artisans who specialize in the technique are called geumbakjang (금박장).

Kim Deokhwan (김덕환; 金德煥) has been designated as a Living National Treasure as holder of Important Intangible Cultural Property No. 119.

== Gallery ==
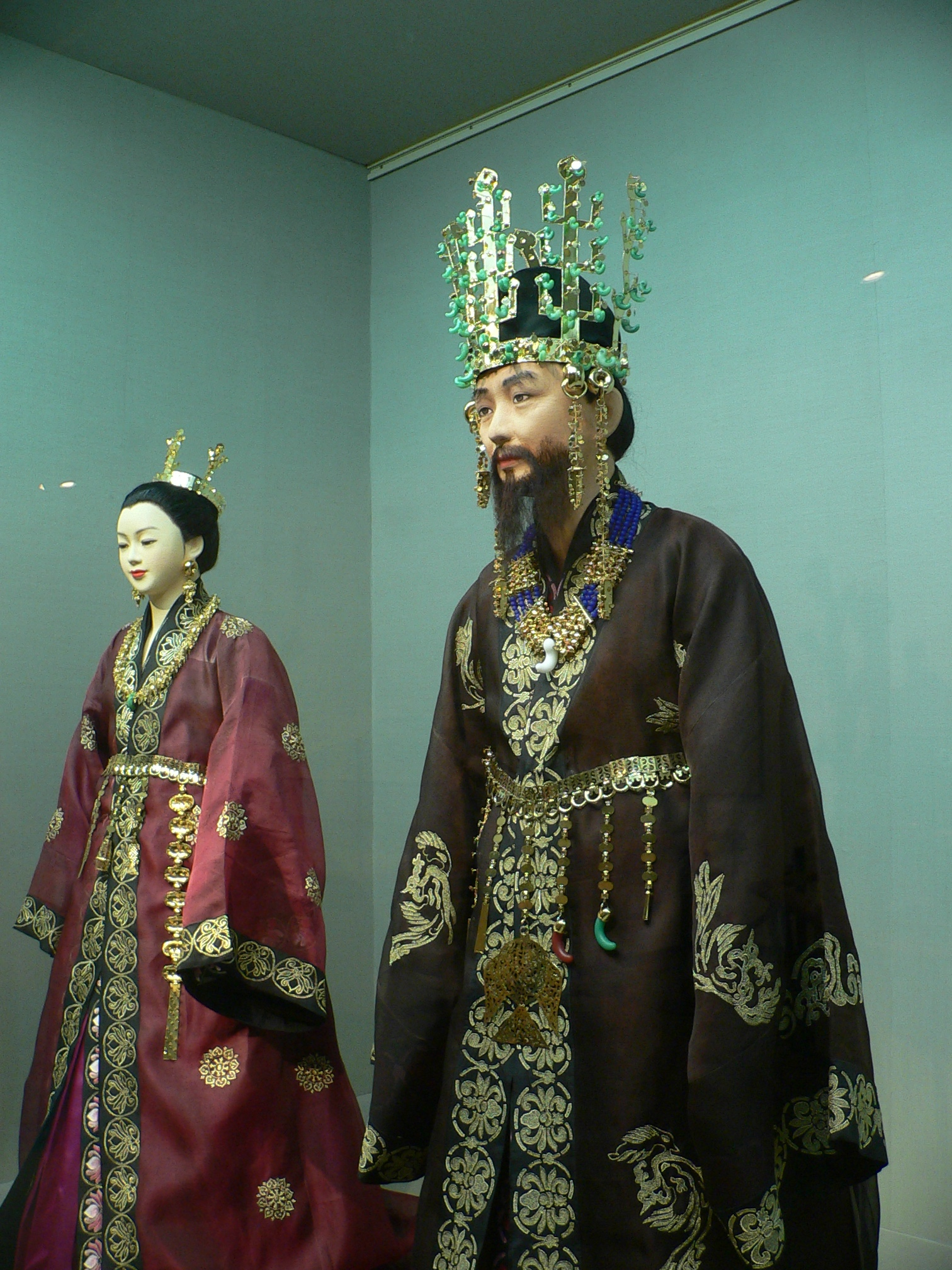

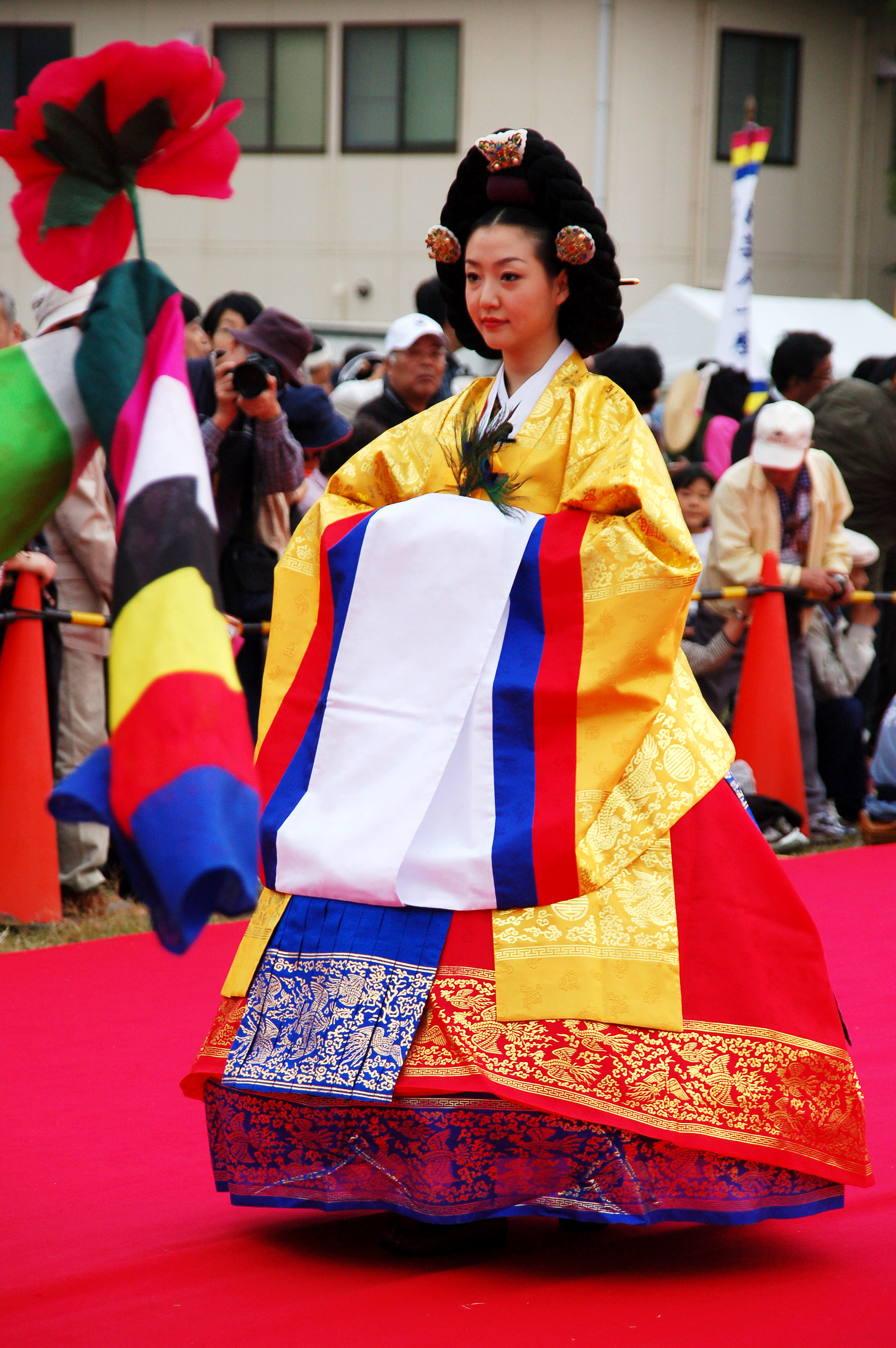

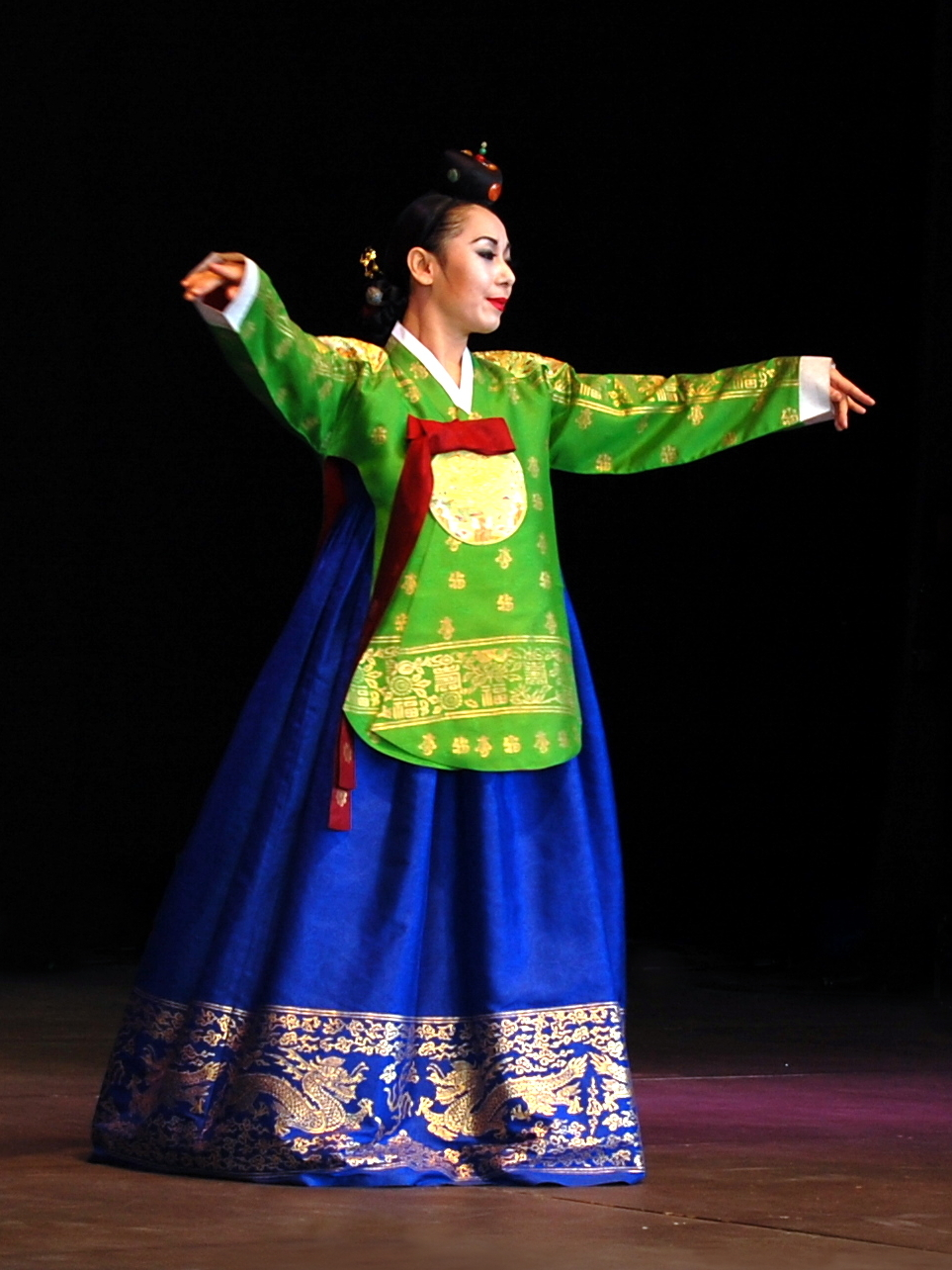

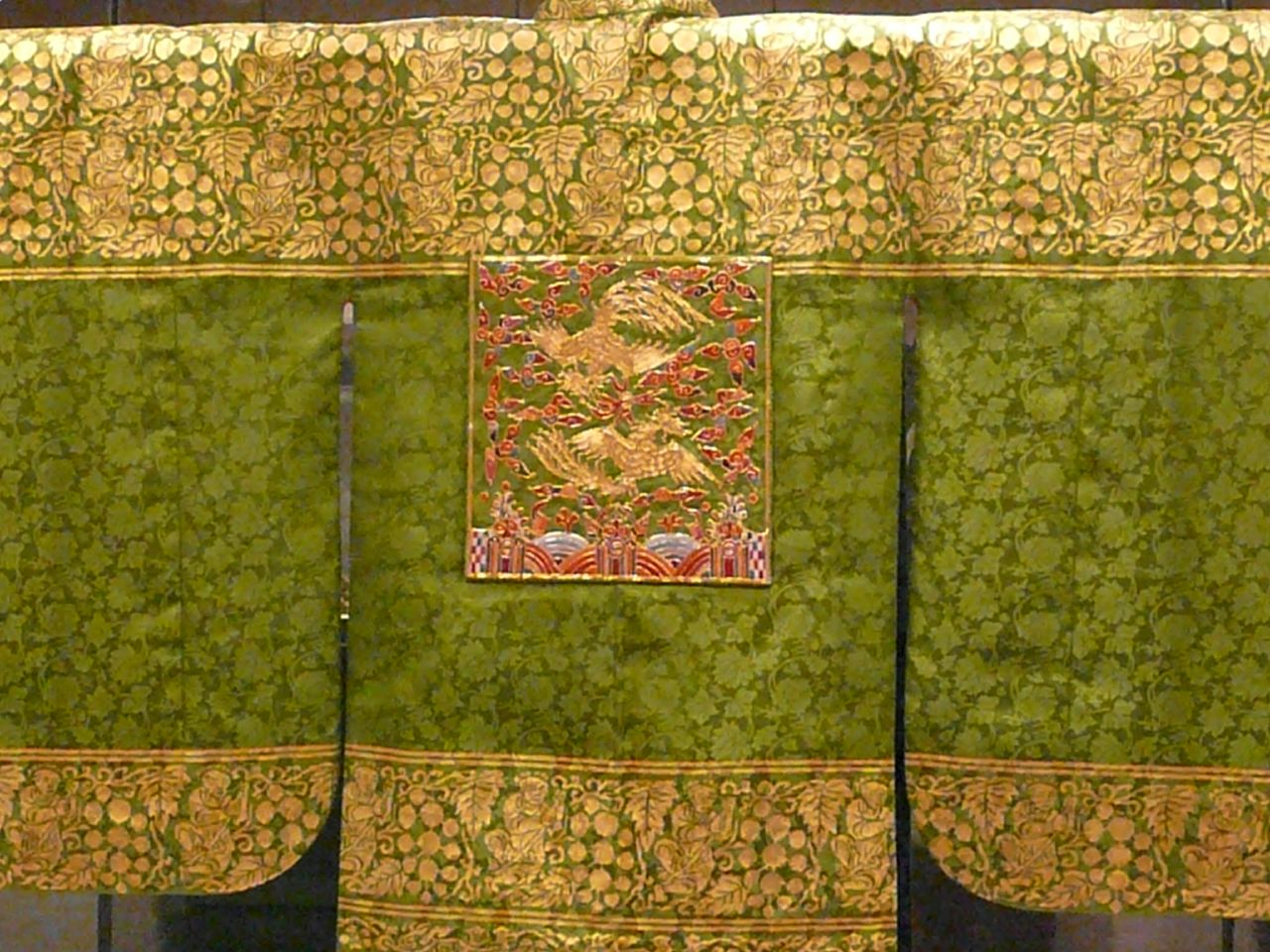
