= Chust, Uzbekistan =

Chust Chust/Чуст
- City
- Chust
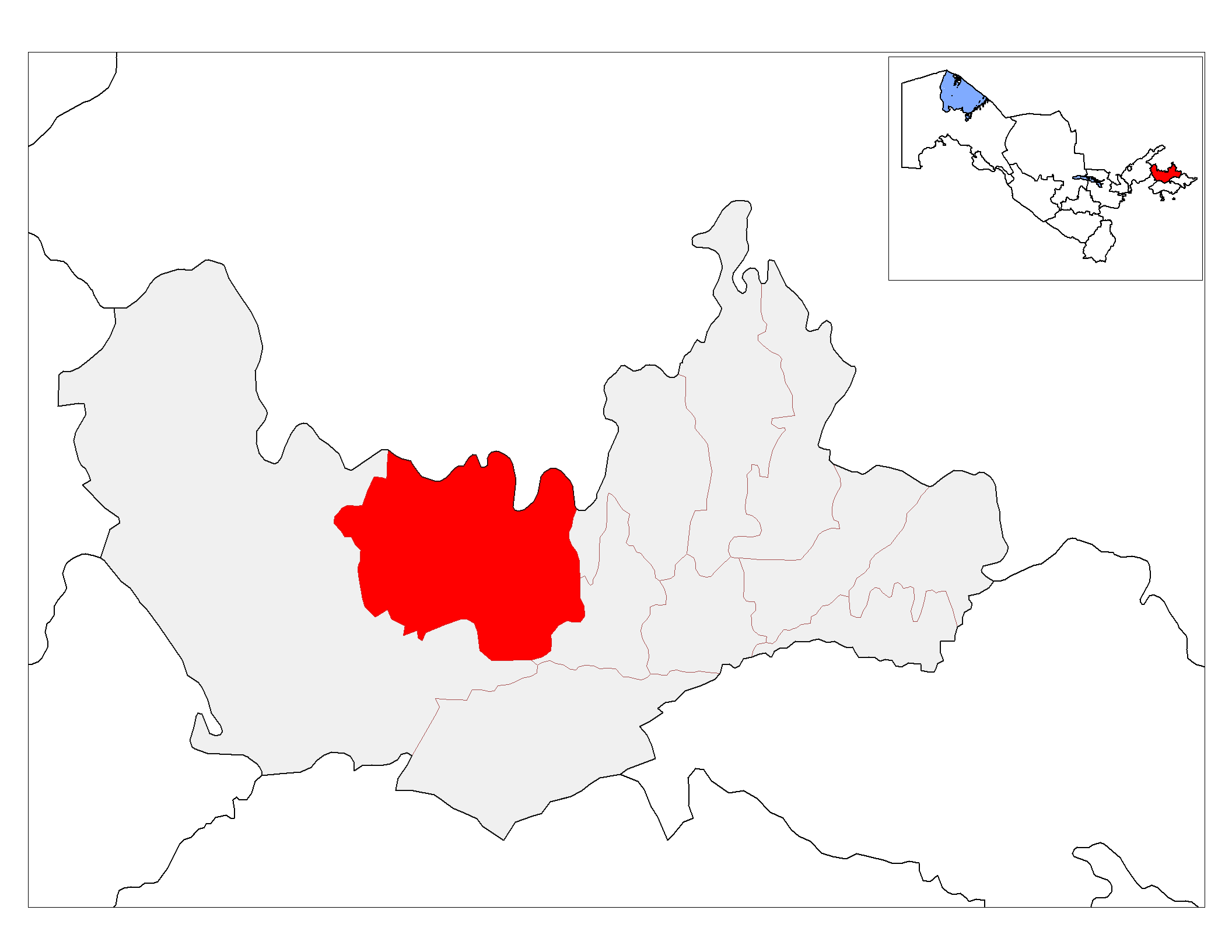

- Location in Uzbekistan
- Coordinates: 40°59′52″N 71°14′25″E
- Country: Uzbekistan
- Region: Namangan Region
- District: Chust District
- City status: 1969
- Elevation: 1,100 m (3,600 ft)

Population (2021)
  - Total: 100,200
- Time zone: UTC+5 (UZT)
  - Summer (DST): UTC+5 (not observed)
- Postal code: 161100
- Area code: +998 6942
- Website: https://chust.uz/

Chust (Uzbek: Chust/Чуст; Russian: Чуст) is a city in eastern Uzbekistan. It is the administrative center of Chust District. The City of Chust is located in the northern corner of the Fergana Valley along the river Chustsoy.

Chust is one of the oldest cities in the Fergana Valley. The Fergana automobile road passes through the city. This road connects Chust with several other places, such as the cities of Namangan, Andijan, Kokand and Fergana.

Chust underwent significant changes during the Soviet period. Many factories and institutions were built during that time. Currently, the city is an important center for cotton processing.

== History ==
Chust is one of the oldest cities in the Fergana Valley. Archaeological studies conducted in 1953, 1957, 1959, and 1961 found items dating back to the late Bronze/early Iron age in the area corresponding to present-day Chust. First scientific information about Chust can be found in A. F. Middendor's Ocherki o Ferganskoy doline (Essays About the Fergana Valley) which was published in St. Petersburg in 1882.

In the Middle Ages, Chust became a fortress. Babur's father Umar Shaikh Mirza II made Chust his residence in 1480. In the 16th century, the city consisted of several small fortresses. Later, a wall surrounding these fortresses was built. In 1882, the walls of the fortress were destroyed and the city started to expand. Over time, Chust became an industrial center.

Following the Russian expansion into Central Asia, new factories were built in Chust. In 1912, there were six cotton mills and one leather factory in Chust. The town was made the administrative center of the newly created Chust District in 1926. Chust received a city status in 1969.

Chust received city status in 1937.

== Geography ==
Chust is located 1,000 metres (3,300 ft)-1,200 metres (3,900 ft) above sea level. By road it is 41.3 kilometres (25.7 mi) to the west of the city of Namangan. The city is situated in the northern corner of the Fergana Valley along the river Chustsoy.

== Population ==
Its population is 100200 (2021). Majority of Chust population are ethnic Uyghurs, and secondary Uzbeks.

Historical population
Year	Pop.	±%
1897	13,785	—
1909	18,555	+34.6%
1974	31,000	+67.1%
2004	63,800	+105.8%
2016	69,100	+8.3%

=== Climate ===
Chust has a cold semi-arid climate (Köppen climate classification BSk) with cold winters and hot summers. The average July temperature is around 27 °C (81 °F). The mean temperature in January is 0 °C (32 °F).

Climate data for Chust
Month	Jan	Feb	Mar	Apr	May	Jun	Jul	Aug	Sep	Oct	Nov	Dec	Year
Mean daily maximum °C	4	6	12	20	25	31	33	32	26	20	13	7	19
Mean daily minimum °C	−4	−2	3	9	13	19	21	19	14	8	3	−1	9
Average precipitation mm	29.9	6.5	11.7	9.2	106.1	7.4	2.9	4	5	8.7	8.3	13.4	213.1
Mean daily maximum °F	39	43	54	68	77	88	91	90	79	68	55	45	66
Mean daily minimum °F	25	28	37	48	55	66	70	66	57	46	37	30	47
Average precipitation inches	1.18	0.26	0.46	0.36	4.18	0.29	0.11	0.2	0.2	0.34	0.33	0.53	8.44

== Economy ==
Chust is a center for cotton processing. It is also known for artisanal products, including pocket knives and embroidered cotton skullcaps known as tubeteika (Uzbek: doʻppi). The city contains the National Knife Factory, in which metal workers "smash and grind their knives from short lengths of steel or iron, honing each blade into the desired shape with a meticulous attention to detail". Knives with a curved tip are a trademark of Chust craftsmen.

Currently there are several

== Education ==
There are colleges and vocational schools in Chust. They include:

- Chust College of Pedagogy
- Chust College of Medicine
- Chust College of Agriculture
- Chust College of Economy
- Chust College of Sport in Gova village
- Chust Academic Lyceum

The city is also home to general education schools (which include boarding schools), two music and art schools, six vocational schools, and three children's sports schools.

== Notable people ==
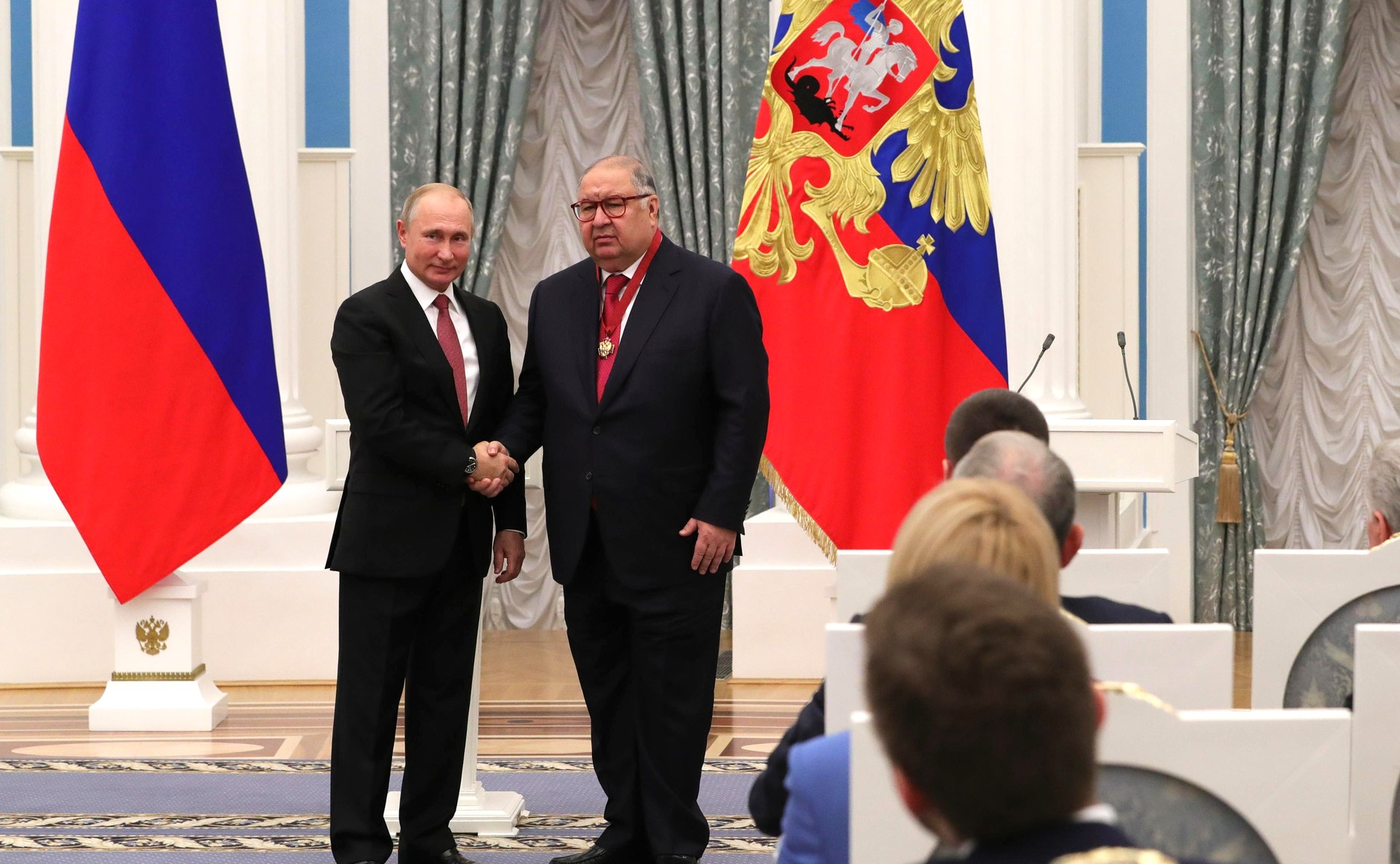
Alisher Usmanov with Vladimir Putin.

- The Russian oligarch Alisher Usmanov, who now lives in Russia, was born in Chust in 1953, and was imprisoned in Uzbekistan for six years for fraud. According to Forbes, he was in 2013 Russia's richest man with a fortune estimated at $17.6 billion and was the world's 34th richest person. But Usmanov's net worth fell by nearly a quarter from February 22 to March 15, 2022, as the West imposed sanctions following the 2022 Russian invasion of Ukraine.
- Poet Muhammadsharif Soʻfizoda (1869—1937) was born in Chust.
