= Tubeteika =

Caps worn in Central Asia

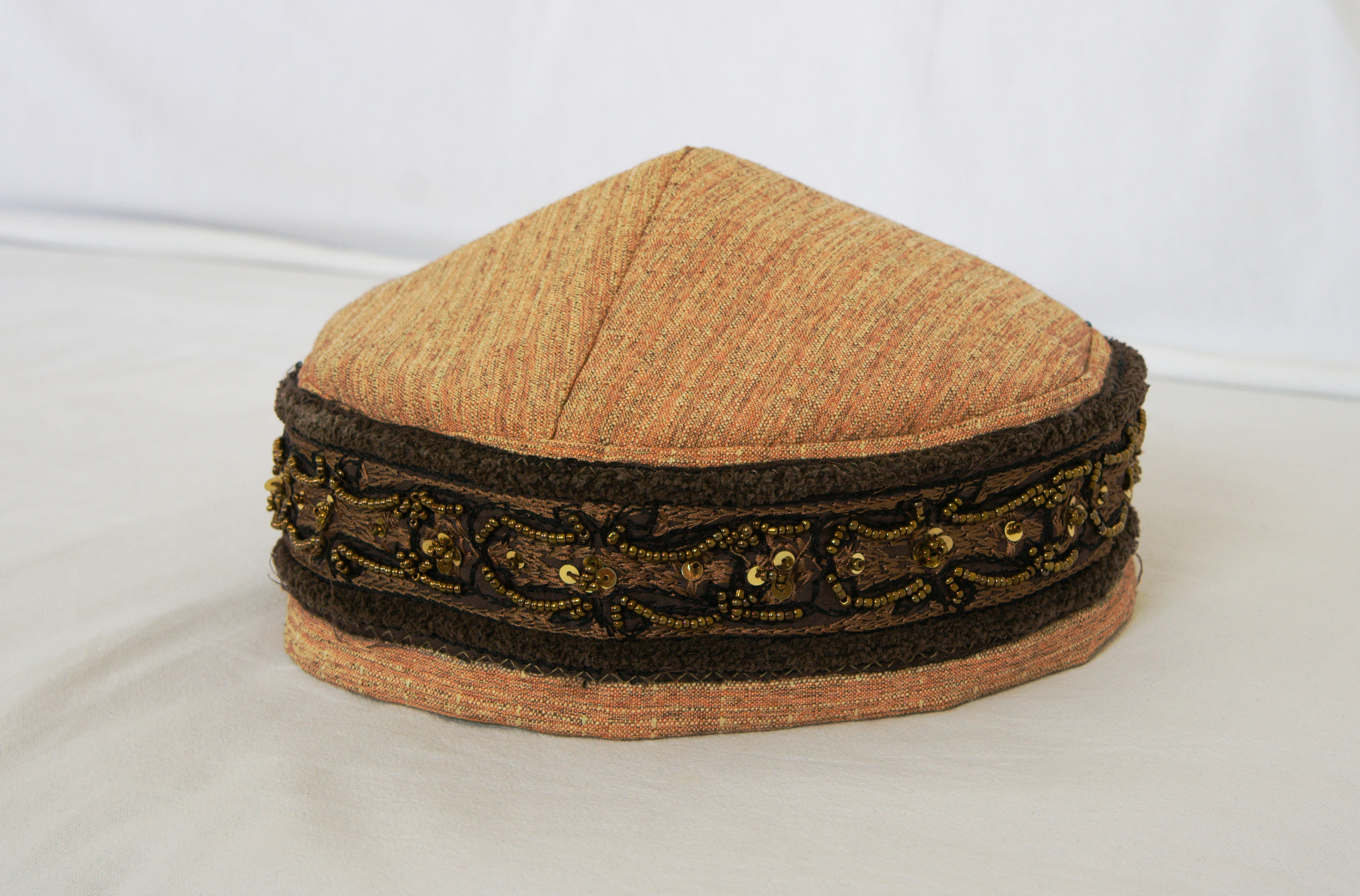
A Crimean Tatar tubeteika

A tubeteika (Tajik: тоқӣ, Tajik: тӯппӣ in Northern Tajikistan, Uzbek: doʻppi / дўппи, Kazakh: төбетей, тақия, Kyrgyz: тебетей, суусар тумак, Tatar: түбәтәй; Russian: тюбете́йка, romanized: tyubeteika, IPA: [tʲʉbʲɪˈtʲeɪ̯kə]) is a Russian word for many varieties of traditional Turkic caps. Tubeteikas are today worn in Tajikistan, Kazakhstan, Kyrgyzstan, and Uzbekistan, as well as in Muslim-populated regions of Russia (mainly Tatars) and Azerbaijan. The skullcap worn by Uzbeks and Uyghurs is called a doppa and has a square base. It was a popular headgear among children throughout the USSR during the 1940s and 1950s.

Tubeteikas differ greatly between different people of the region and even between different regions of same countries. Tajik toqis feature a great variety of styles, ranging from square black-and-white ones in Sughd to round multicolored styles in the Southern regions including Khatlon and round red, green and other styles in the east (Pamir). Turkic varieties bear some superficial resemblance to the yurt, another Central Asian cultural icon.

The -ka at the end is a Russian diminutive suffix, as with shapka, ushanka, kubanka, pilotka and budenovka. In Turkmen, it is called tahiya ("taqiyah").

== Doppa and Toki ==
The doppa or duppi (Uzbek: doʻppi, Tajik: тӯппӣ) is considered an applied art form and an important part of the traditional folk costume. Black with a flat, square base, In Chust, Uzbekistan, the caps are made with white embroidery with "four arches [which] represent impenetrable gates that will keep all enemies at bay; the burning peppers protect against the evil eye; and the almonds or bodom are said to symbolise life and fertility".

In Tajikistan, styles vary greatly depending on the region: in the north (Sughd), they are traditionally square and mostly black-and-white, while in the south (Khatlon) they are round and usually made with bright colors. In Pamir, tubeteikas are more influenced by Zoroastrianism, with multiple styles as well. Even though a part of traditional clothes, in Soviet times people started wearing tubeteikas with Western-style clothes, for example it was common to wear a tubeteika with suits and button-down shirts. This trend continued after gaining independence and is ongoing with more traditional clothes being mixed with Western clothes.

Also, there is a trend among Sephardic and Moroccan Jews to wear tubeteikas as a kippah.

== Gallery ==
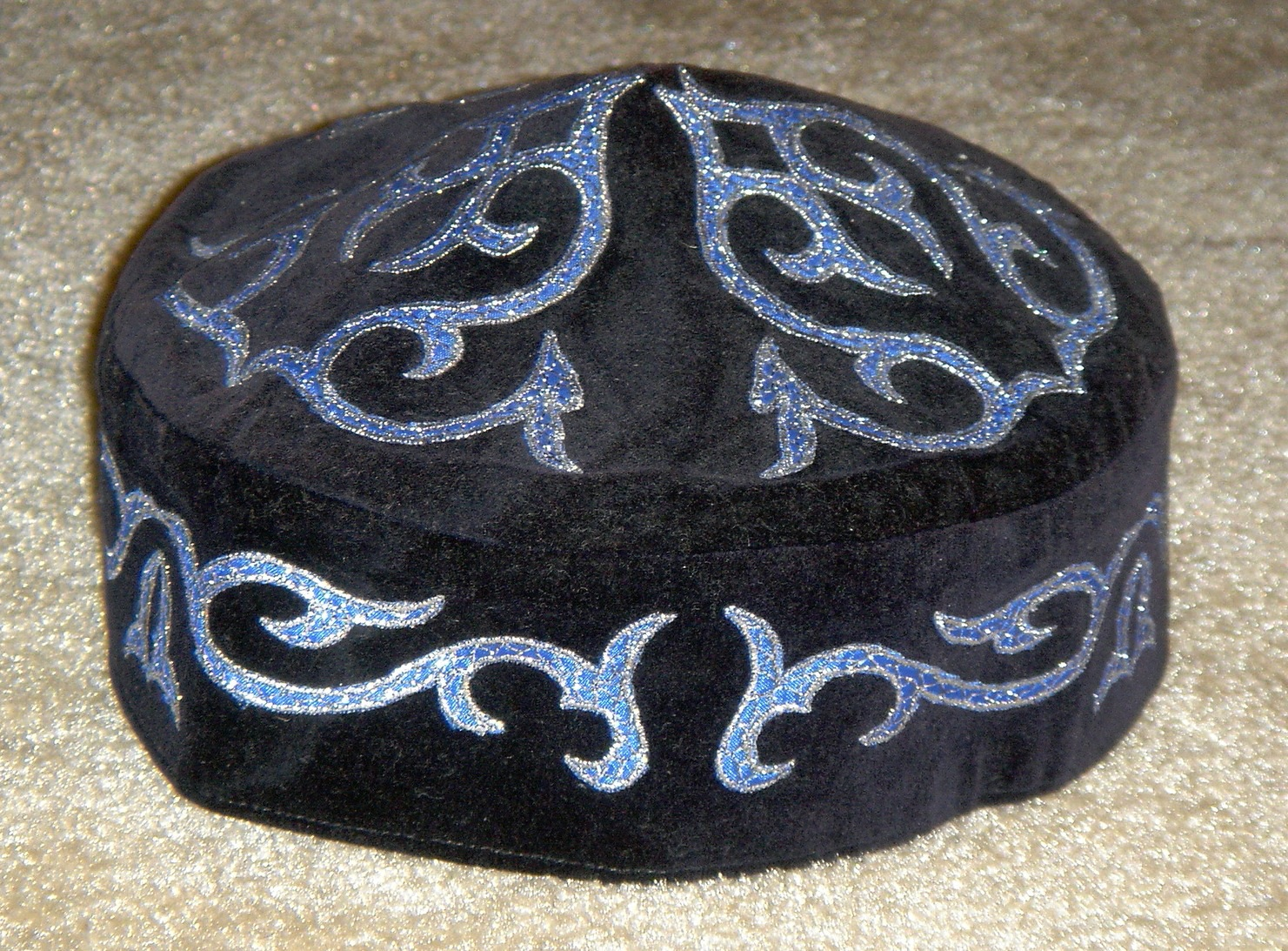
A Kazakh töbetei

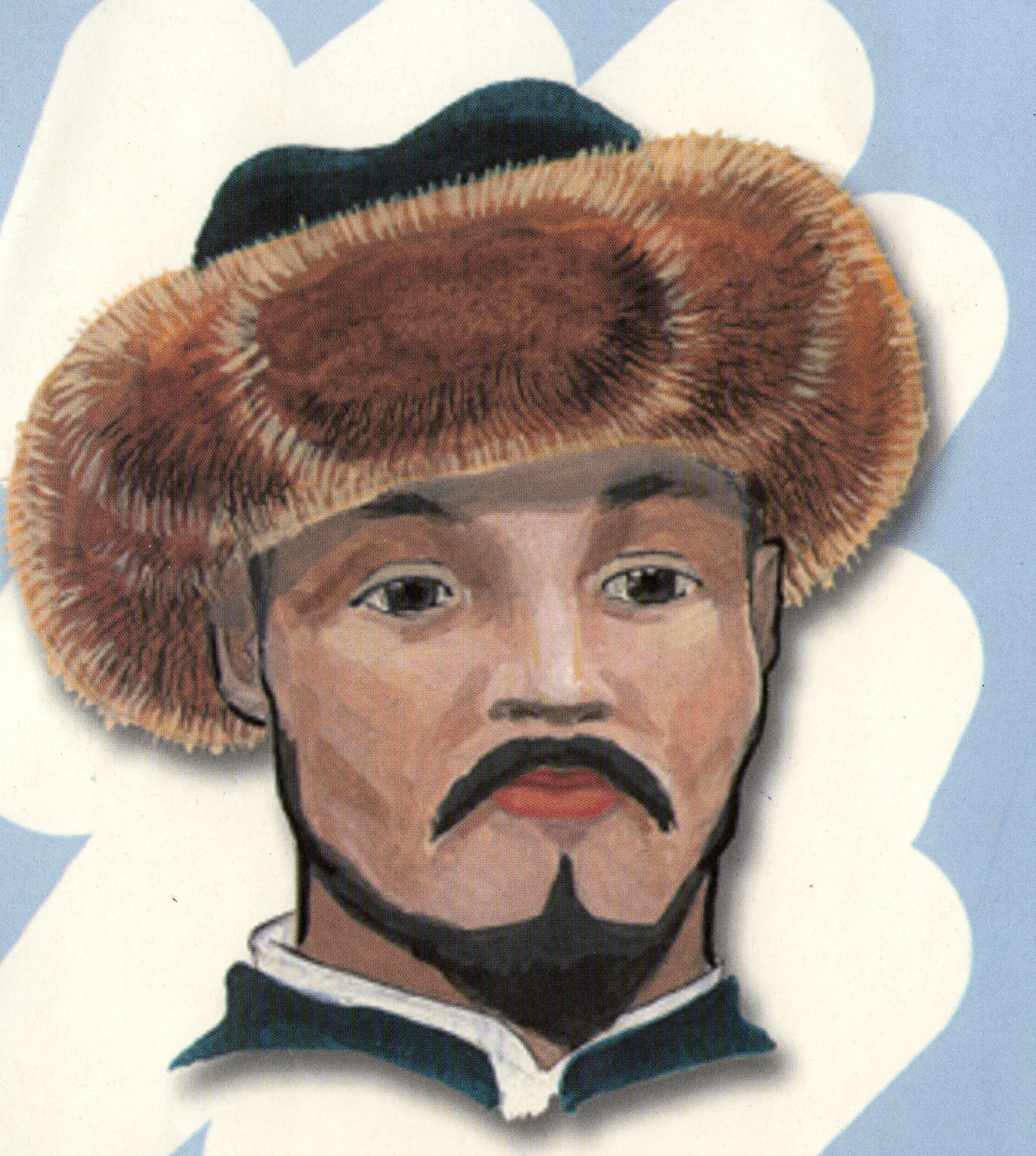
A Kyrgyz tebetey

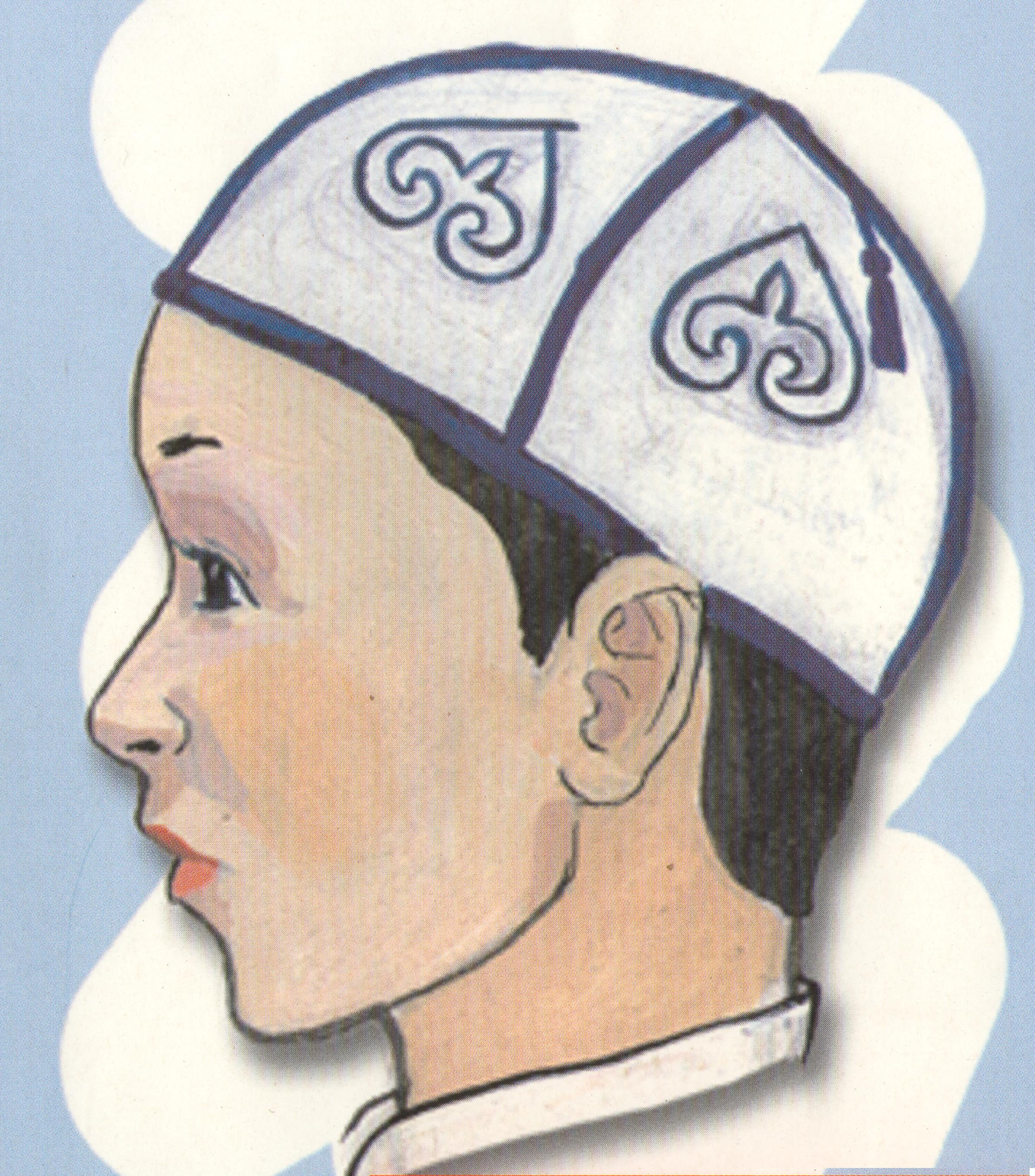
A Kyrgyz topu

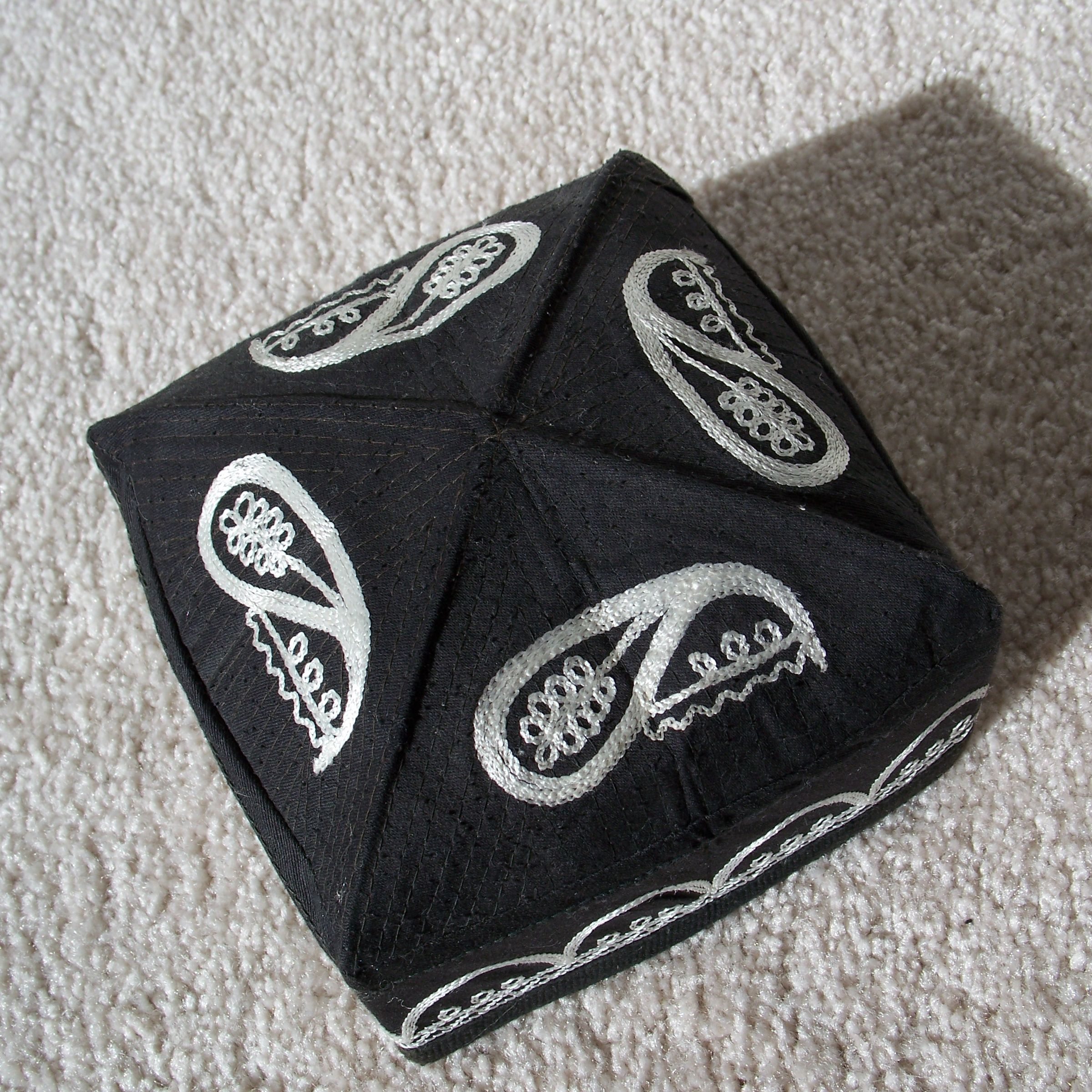
A Tajik tuppi

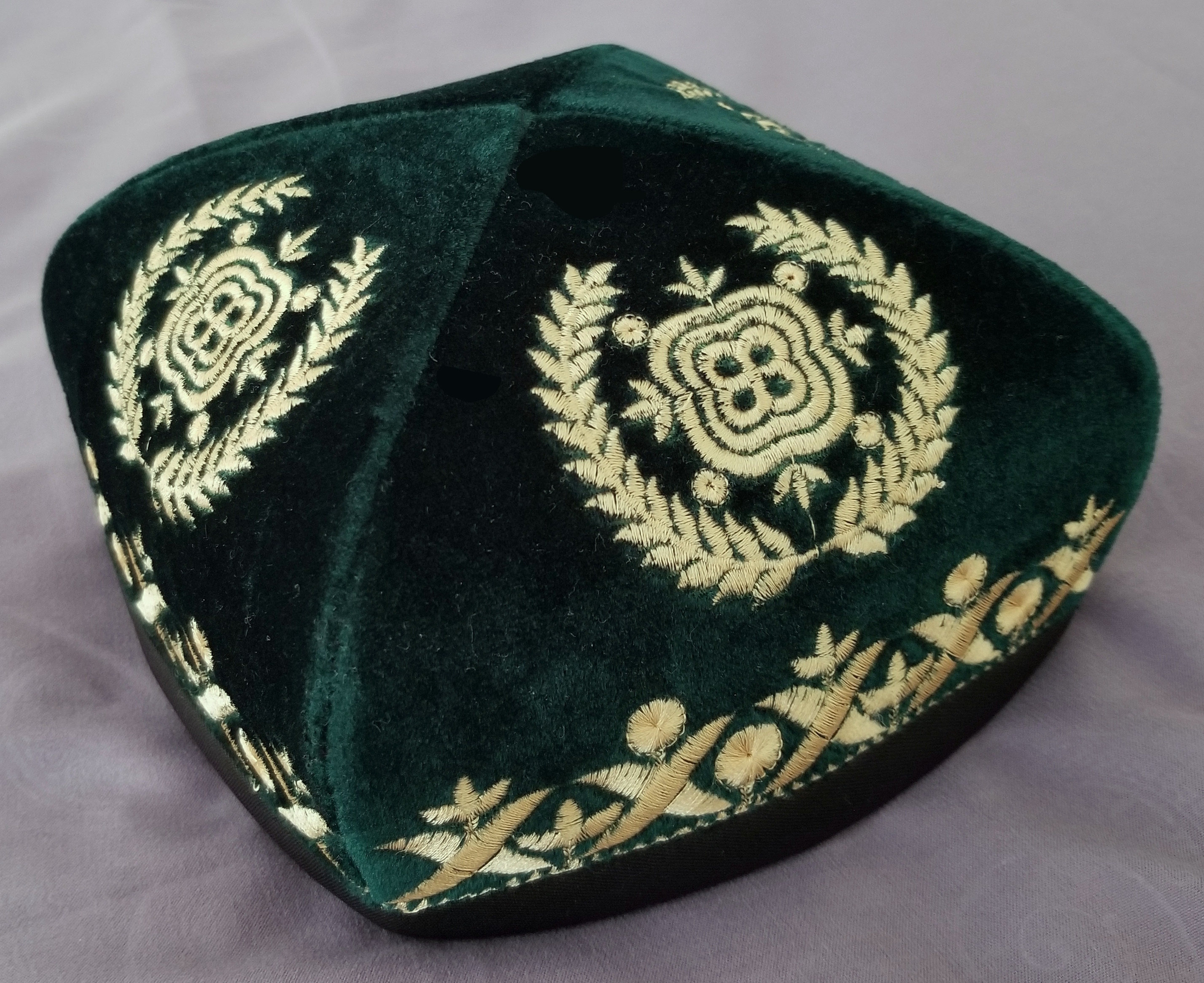
A Uyghur doppa

== See also ==
- List of hat styles
