= Types of hijab =

This table of types of hijab describes terminologically distinguished styles of clothing commonly associated with the word hijab.

The Arabic word hijāb can be translated as "cover, wrap, curtain, veil, screen, partition", among other meanings. In the Quran it refers to notions of separation, protection and covering in both literal and metaphorical senses. Subsequently, the word has evolved in meaning and now usually denotes a Muslim woman's veil. In English, the term refers predominantly to the head covering for women and its underlying religious precepts. Not all Muslims believe the hijab is mandated in Islam.

== List ==
Name	Image	Description
Abaya عباية		Full-length, robe-like outer garment that covers the whole body except the head, feet, and hands. Usually worn with a headscarf or (especially in Saudi Arabia) gloves and niqab.
al-Amira		A two-piece veil. It consists of a close fitting cap, usually made from cotton or polyester, and an accompanying tube-like scarf.
Bushiyya		A veil that is tied on at the forehead and falls to cover the entire face but has no cut-out for the eyes; instead, the fabric is sheer enough to be seen through (Middle East, specifically Persian Gulf).
Bukhnuq بخنق		This is similar to khimār 2 (see below) but comes down just to the bosom. Sometimes called "Amira hijab" if it has embroidery at the edge.
Eastern Arabia Batula (Battoulah) برقع شرق الجزيرة العربية		Women wear it in United Arab Emirates, Oman, Qatar and Arabs of Southern Iran. This tradition has almost died out in the newer generations. Older women past 50, and those living in rural areas can still be seen wearing them.
Burqa or Chadari Bengali برقع، چادری		Traditional Central Asian style outer garment that covers the entire body and has a grille over the face that the woman looks through. Very similar in style and function to other Central Asian styles such as the paranja. Burqa or Chadari Bengali were traditionally worn in Chechnya and Uzbekistan and transferred to Afghanistan by salafis.
Chador		An Iranian traditional outer garment (also worn in other countries) that covers the head and body and is a full-length semicircle of fabric but comes down to the ground. Does not have slits for the hands and is held shut with the hands, teeth or simply wrapped under the arms.
Elechek		White turban traditionally worn by Kyrgyz women, currently reserved for special occasions. The same as Kimeshek in Kazakhstan or Karakalpakstan
Haik حايك		A type of North African veil that covers the entire body, and is often wrapped around the head to cover the hair; is often paired with an aadjar, or a short, handkerchief-like face covering.
Hijāb حجاب		Scarf or headscarf covering the hair, neck, and ears. The hijab leaves the face exposed.
Jilbāb (1) جلباب	generic	The term used in the Qur'an (Suratu l-Ahzāb, āya 59) to refer to the outer garment. In Indonesia, the term jilbab refers exclusively to the head-covering.
Jilbāb (2)		A type of outer garment that looks like a long raincoat or trenchcoat.
Kalpak		Traditional headgear of unmarried woman in Kazakhstan, Karakalpakstan and Kyrgyzstan.
Kalfak (ru:Калфак, tt:Калфак)		Traditional headgear of Tatar women.
Kashmau (ba:Ҡашмау, ru:Кашмау)		Traditional headgear of Bashkir women.
Kelaghayi		A traditional Azerbaijani women's headgear.
Kerudung		Although similar to the Malaysian tudong (below), the modern Indonesian kerudung usually includes a stiff visor above the eyes.
Khimār (1) خمار	generic	The term used in the Qur'an (Suratu n-Nūr, āya 31) to refer to the headscarf; the word "hijāb" is more commonly used with this meaning.
Khimār (2)		Most commonly, a circular head covering with a hole cut out for the face, which usually comes down to the waist. Note the variations bukhnuq and chador above, which are the same style but different lengths.
Kimeshek		Traditional headgear of married woman in Kazakhstan, Karakalpakstan and Kyrgyzstan.
Kurhars		Traditional headgear of unmarried woman in Ingushetia.
Lachak		Traditional festive headgear of woman, who has married sons and daughters, in Uzbekistan, and Tajikistan, quite similar to Elechek and Kimeshek, worn only at party where only women are present (as at presence of men face was completely closed). https://moluch.ru/archive/47/5858/
Mukena		
Niqaab نقاب		A veil that covers the face and entire head but with a place cut out for the eyes (image: style worn in Yemen).
Niqaab (2)		A veil that is tied on at the bridge of the nose and falls to cover the lower face. Also called "half niqab".
Oramal		A traditional kerchief used in Central Asia and the Caucasus (note how it is banded, the neck is usually not covered by it). In some countries like Uzbekistan it was traditionally used only at home, while in public the paranja was more popular. In other countries, like Kazakhstan, it was commonly used in public. In Kyrgyzstan, the white color is an indication that the woman is married.
Paranja		A Central Asian traditional outer garment that covers the head and body, heavy in weight and made from horsehair. Once prevalent in Uzbek and Tajik societies.
Safseri		Traditional Tunisian veil worn by women, composed of a large piece of cream-colored cloth covering the whole body.
Selendang		In Southeast Asia, a multi-purpose shoulder sash that can be tied around the shoulders to carry infants and groceries, or draped over the head.
Shayla		Long, rectangular scarf, wrapped around the head and tucked or pinned in place at the shoulders. Popular in Arab states of the Persian Gulf.
Sommak		Festive headgear of Turkmens unmarried woman made from silver plates (for everyday used Taqiyah and oramal)
Taqiyah		Xinjiang - usually worn without scarf and called doppa; Tajikistan, Uzbekistan - always worn without scarf, called in general tubeteika, doppa in Uzbekistan and North Tajikistan, and tokki in other regions of Tajikistan.; Tatarstan and Caucasus - worn always with scarf; Kazakhstan, Kyrgyzstan, and Karkalpakstan - worn for little girls only
Thawb		Typically worn by Sudanese women. a long, colorful fabric wrap typically worn over a dress or shirt and a skirt. In the past, the Toob was worn by all Sudanese women, but modern preferences have shifted towards more contemporary clothing styles.
Tudung		Headscarf worn in Malaysia and Indonesia. In Indonesia, the term kerudung (above) is much more common.
Türban		Turkish term for a headscarf pinned neatly at the sides.

== See also ==
- Head coverings in Abrahamic faiths:
  - Head covering for Jewish women
  - Head covering for Christian women
- Head coverings in other faiths:
  - Sikh women and turbans
  - Ghoonghat (Hindu and Jain women)
- Islamic clothing
- Other types of head coverings:
  - Coif
  - Headscarf
  - Kerchief
  - Veil
