= Burqa =

Garment worn by some Muslim women

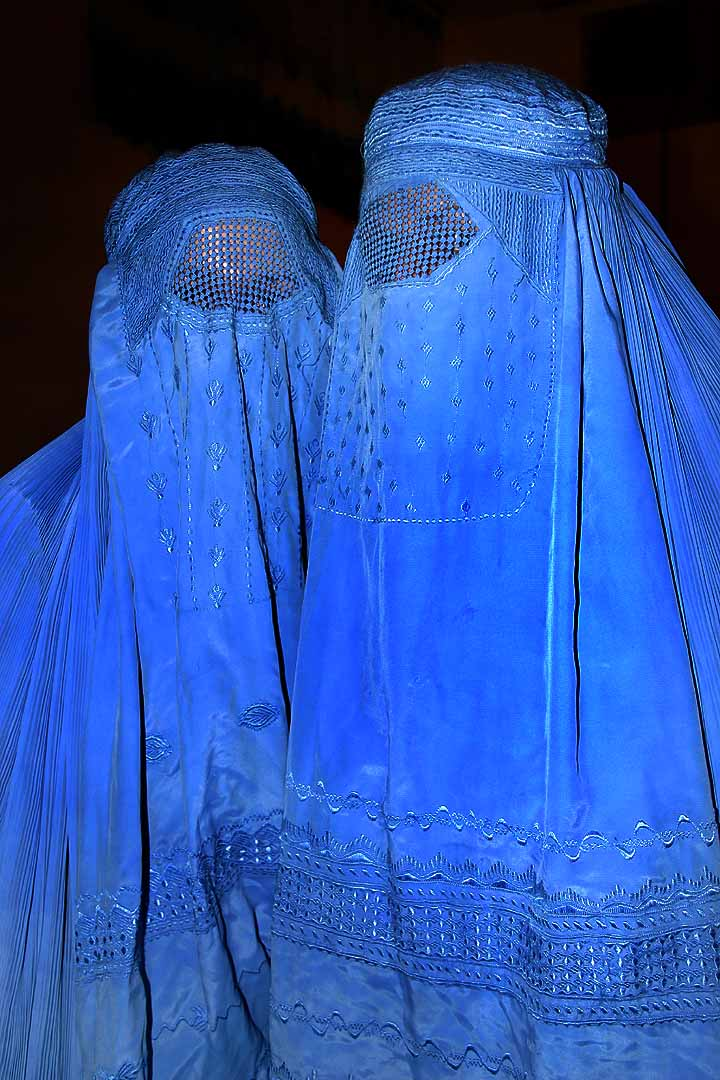
Women wearing burqas in Afghanistan

A burqa, (Note: Originating from Arabic: برقع, /ˈbɜːrkə/ burquʿ or burqaʿ, and Urdu: بُرقع, it is also transliterated as burkha, bourkaa, burqua or burqu' or borgha' and is pronounced natively [ˈbʊrqʊʕ, ˈbʊrqɑʕ]. It is generally pronounced in the local variety of Arabic or Persian, which varies. Examples: Egyptian Arabic: [ˈboɾʔoʕ], plural: Egyptian Arabic pronunciation: [bæˈɾæːʔeʕ], in Literary Arabic by Egyptians: Egyptian Arabic pronunciation: [ˈborqoʕ], plural: Egyptian Arabic pronunciation: [bɑˈɾɑːqeʕ].) also known as harabah, (Note: Arabic: حرابة) is a type of enveloping outer garment worn by some Muslim women which fully covers the body and the face.

The use of face veils has been documented in various ancient cultures, including the Byzantine Empire, Persia, and Arabia. Historical sources mention women’s practices of face veiling. Additionally, Biblical references in Genesis highlight the use of veils. Oriental Orthodox Christian women traditionally wore dark garments with veils, white for the unmarried and black for the married.

Face veiling has not been regarded as a religious requirement by most Islamic scholars, either historically or currently. Quranic verses such as 24:31 and 33:59 are interpreted as encouraging modesty and security for women, and most scholars agree that full-face covering is not required. Women who wear the burqa view it as a symbol of modesty, piety, and cultural identity, while others choose it as an expression of personal or religious commitment. A minority of scholars in the Islamic jurisprudence (fiqh) consider it to be obligatory for Muslim women when they are in the presence of non-related (i.e., non-mahram) males. This is in order to prevent men from looking (perversely) at women. This aligns with the principles of Islamic jurisprudence, which requires men to observe modesty by lowering their gaze in the presence of women.

Women may wear the burqa for a number of reasons, including compulsion, as was the case during the Taliban's first rule of Afghanistan. However, several countries have enacted full or partial bans on its use in public spaces. These include Austria, France, Belgium, Denmark, Bulgaria, the Netherlands (in public schools, hospitals and on public transport), Germany (partial bans in some states), Italy, Kazakhstan, Portugal, Spain (in some localities of Catalonia), Russia (in the Stavropol Krai), Luxembourg, Switzerland, Norway (in nurseries, public schools and universities), Canada (in the public workplace in Quebec), Gabon, Chad, Senegal, the Republic of the Congo, Cameroon (in some localities), Niger (in some localities), Sri Lanka, Tajikistan, Azerbaijan (in public schools), Turkey (in the judiciary, military and police), Kosovo (in public schools), Bosnia and Herzegovina (in courts and other legal institutions), Morocco (ban on manufacturing, marketing and sale), Tunisia (in public institutions), Egypt (in universities), Algeria (in the public workplace), and China (in Xinjiang).

== Related garments ==
In Central Asia, there is a similar garment called paranja (/ˈpærənˌdʒɑː/; Russian: паранджа́; Tatar: пәрәнҗә). The Arab version of the burqa is called the boshiya and is usually black.

== Pre-Islamic use of the face veil ==
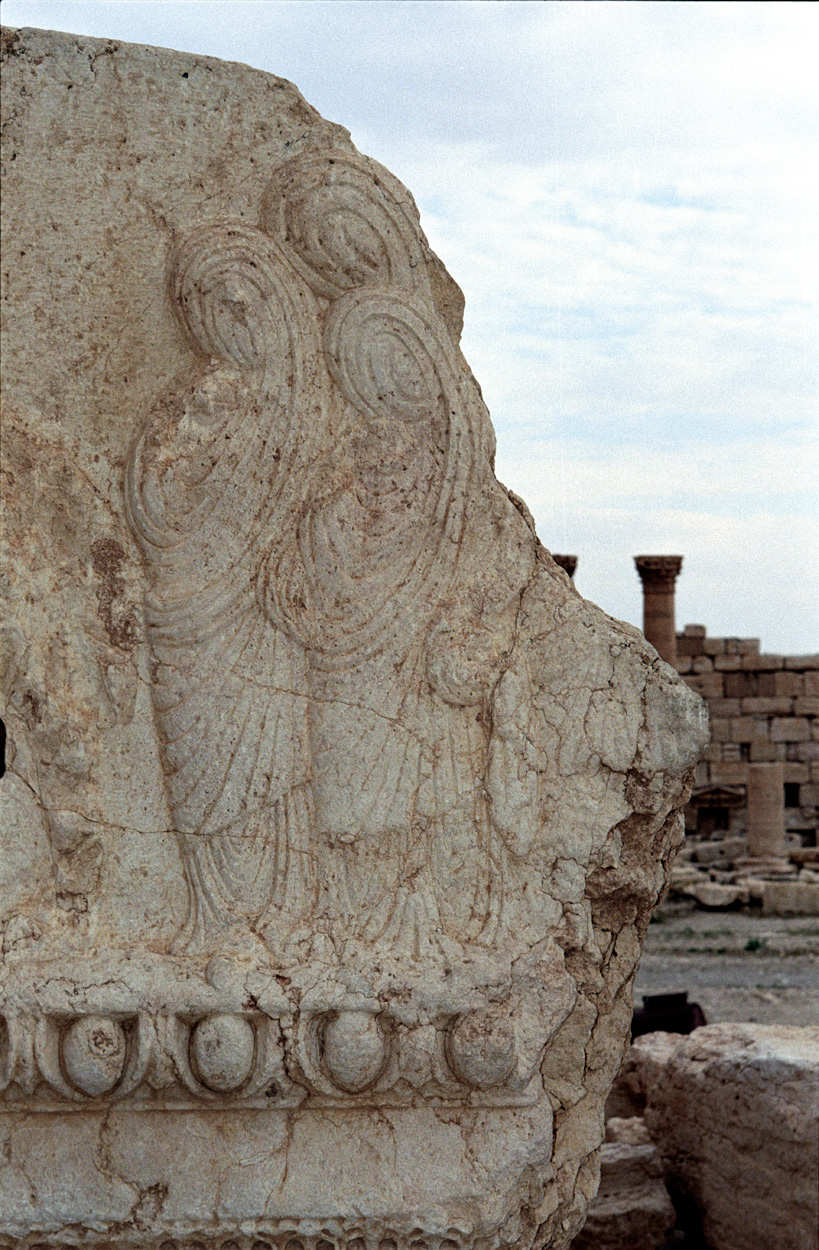
Pre-Islamic relief showing veiled Middle Eastern women, Temple of Baal, Palmyra, Syria, 1st century AD (in Iran)

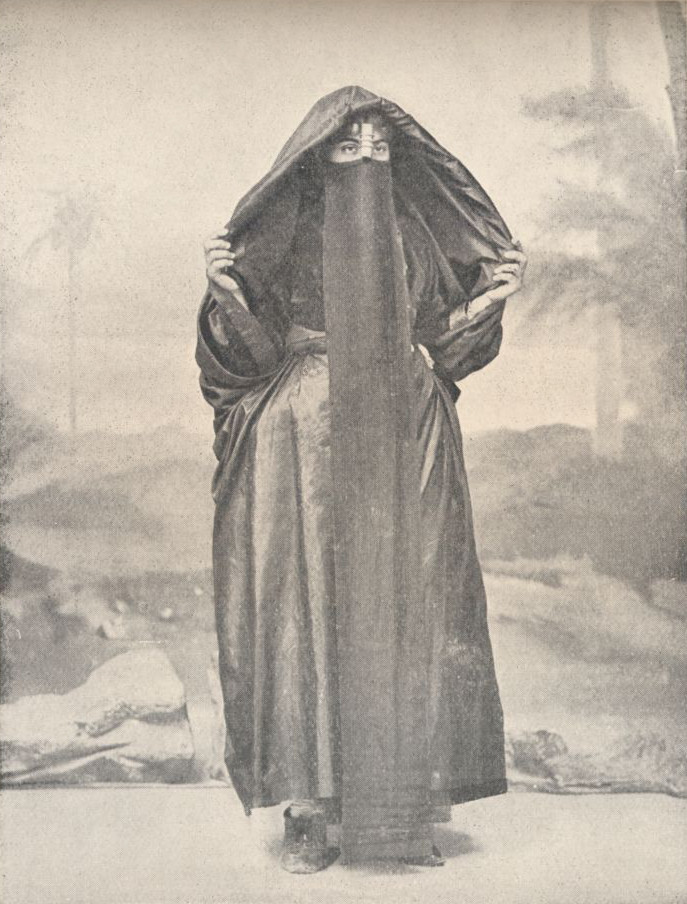
Coptic Orthodox Christian woman wearing a garment with a Christian head covering (1918)

The face veil was originally part of women's dress among certain classes in the Byzantine Empire.

However, although Byzantine art before Islam commonly depicts women with veiled heads or covered hair, it does not depict women with veiled faces. In addition, the Greek geographer Strabo, writing in the 1st century AD, refers to some Persian women veiling their faces; and the early third-century Christian writer Tertullian clearly refers in his treatise The Veiling of Virgins to some "pagan" women of "Arabia" wearing a veil that covers not only their head but also the entire face. (Note: Latin: Judicabunt vos Arabiae feminae ethnicae quae non-caput, sed faciem totam tegunt, ut uno oculo liberato contentae sint dimidiam frui lucem quam totam faciem prostituere) Clement of Alexandria commends the contemporary use of face coverings. There are also two Biblical references to the employment of covering face veils in Genesis 38:14 and Genesis 24:65, by Tamar and by Rebecca, the daughters-in-law of Judah and his great-grandfather Abraham, respectively. These primary sources show that some women in Persia, Egypt, Arabia, and ancient Israel veiled their faces long before Islam. In the case of Tamar, the Biblical text 'When Judah saw her, he thought her to be a harlot; because she had covered her face' indicates customary, if not sacred, use of the face veil to accentuate rather than disguise sexuality.

=== Oriental Orthodoxy ===
In Oriental Orthodox Christianity, Coptic women historically covered their head and face in public and in the presence of men. During the 19th century, upper-class urban Christian and Muslim women in Egypt wore the burqa garment which was known there as harabah. The name harabah, derives from early Christian and Judaic religious vocabulary, which may indicate the origins of the garment itself. Unmarried women generally wore white veils while married women wore black.

Coptic Orthodox Christian women historically have worn dark-coloured full garments, along with a Christian head covering that included a veil to wear in public. Women who are unmarried wear white-coloured veils and married women wear black-coloured veils.

== Face veiling in Islam ==
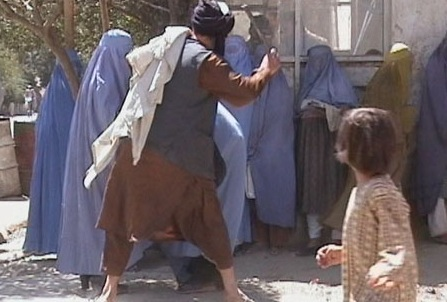
A religious policeman beating a woman for removing her burqa headpiece in public, Kabul, 2001 (image obtained by the Revolutionary Association of the Women of Afghanistan)

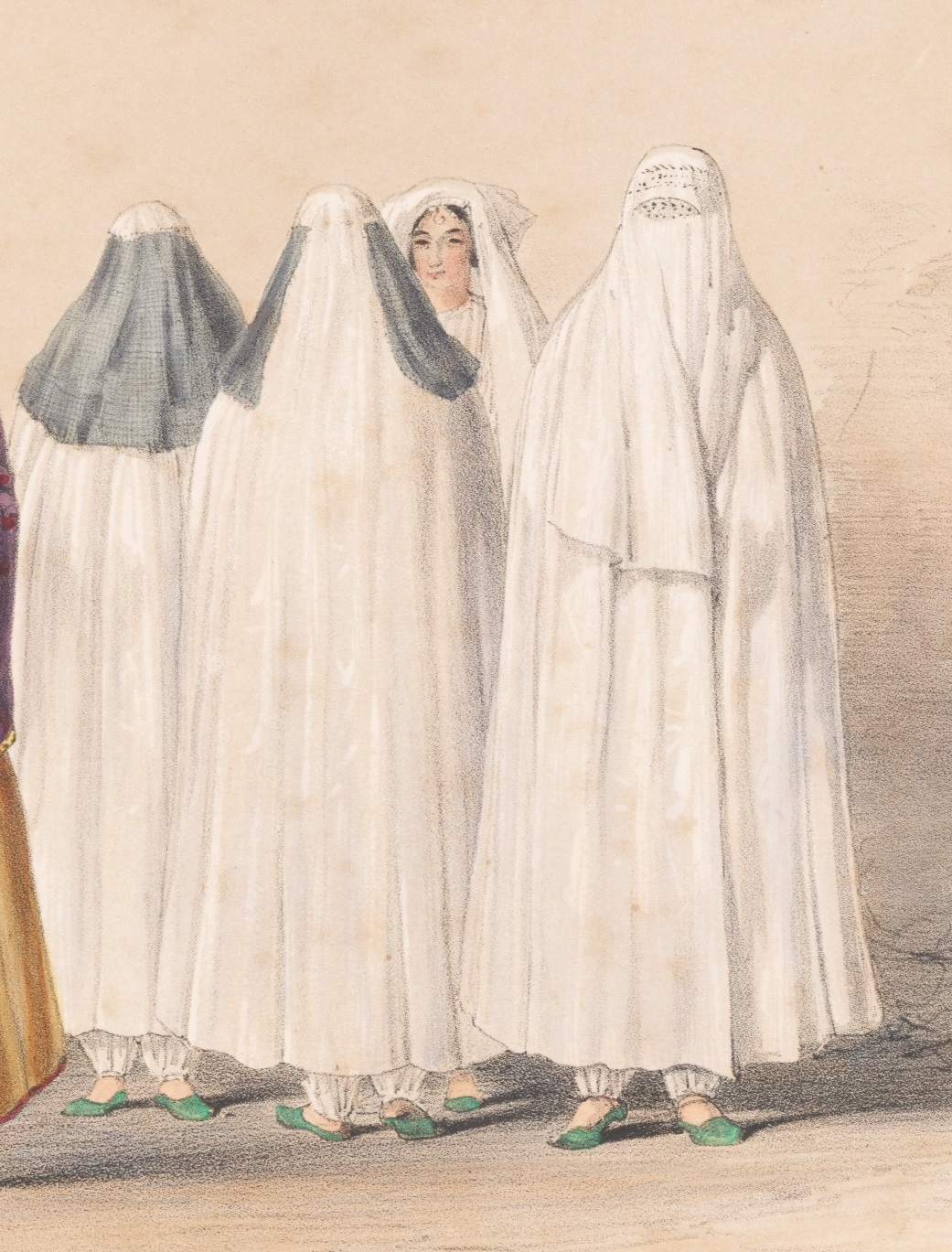
A painting of Afghan women in notably white burqa in Kabul, 1840

Despite legal requirements and prevalence in certain regions, many modern Islamic scholars and most contemporary Islamic jurists have said that Islam does not require women to cover their faces.

=== Scriptural sources ===
Although the Quran commands both men and women to behave modestly and contains no precise prescription for how women should dress, certain Quranic verses have been used in exegetical discussions of face veiling. Coming after a verse which instructs men to lower their gaze and guard their modesty, verse 24:31 instructs women to do the same, providing additional detail:

Tell the believing women to lower their eyes, guard their private parts (furuj), and not display their charms (zina) except what is apparent outwardly, and cover their bosoms with their veils (khumur, sing. khimar) and not to show their finery except to their husbands or their fathers or fathers-in-law [...]

The verse goes on to list a number of other types of exempted males. Classical Quranic commentators differed in their interpretation of the phrase "except what is apparent outwardly". Some said that it referred to face and hands, implying that these body parts need not be covered, while others disagreed.

Another passage, known as the "mantle verse" (33:59), has been interpreted as establishing women's security as a rationale for veiling:

O Prophet, tell your wives and daughters, and the women of the faithful, to draw their wraps (jalabib, sing. jilbab) over them. They will thus be recognized and no harm will come to them. God is forgiving and kind.

Based on the context of the verse and early Islamic literature, this verse has been generally understood as establishing a way to protect the Muslim women from a hostile faction who had molested them on the streets of Medina, claiming that they confused them with slave girls.

A sahih hadith (authentic tradition) elaborates the circumstances under which the verse was revealed and attributes it to Umar ibn al-Khattab for taunting one of Muhammad's wives while she was walking.

The exact nature of garments referred to in these verses, khimar and jilbab, has been debated by traditional and modern scholars.

Islamic scholars who hold that face veiling is not obligatory also base this on a narration from one of the canonical hadith collections (sayings attributed to Muhammad), in which he tells Asma', the daughter of Abu Bakr: "O Asmaʿ, when a woman reaches the age of menstruation, it does not suit her that she displays her parts of body except this and this", pointing to her face and hands (Abū Dawūd, Book 32, Number 4092). According to Yusuf al-Qaradawi, traditional hadith scholars have not viewed this narration as providing proof on its own, because its recorded chain of transmission made them uncertain about its authenticity, but those who argued that face veiling is not required have used it as supporting evidence along other practices, such as those recording customary practice at the time of prophet Muhammad and his companions however it is argued that this because of the low resources and incapability at the time.

=== Classical jurisprudence ===
When veiling was discussed in early Islamic jurisprudence beyond the context of prayer, it was generally considered an "issue of social status and physical safety". Later, during the medieval era, Islamic jurists began to devote more attention to the notion of awra (intimate parts) and the question of whether women should cover their faces. The majority opinion which emerged during that time, predominant among Maliki and Hanafi jurists, held that women should cover everything except their faces in public. In contrast, most medieval Hanbali and Shafi'i (two of the four Islamic madhabs) jurists counted a woman's face among her awra (parts that shouldn't be shown), concluding that it should be veiled, except for the eyes. The Hanbali jurist Ibn Taymiyyah (d. 1328 CE) was an influential proponent of the latter view, while the Hanafi scholar Burhan al-Din al-Marghinani (d. 1197 CE) stressed that it was particularly important for a woman to leave her face and hands uncovered during everyday business dealing with men. There was a difference of opinion on this question within the legal schools. Thus, Yusuf al-Qaradawi quotes Shafi'i and Hanbali jurists stating that covering the face is not obligatory.

In the Shi'a Ja'fari school of fiqh, covering the face is not obligatory.

=== Salafi views ===
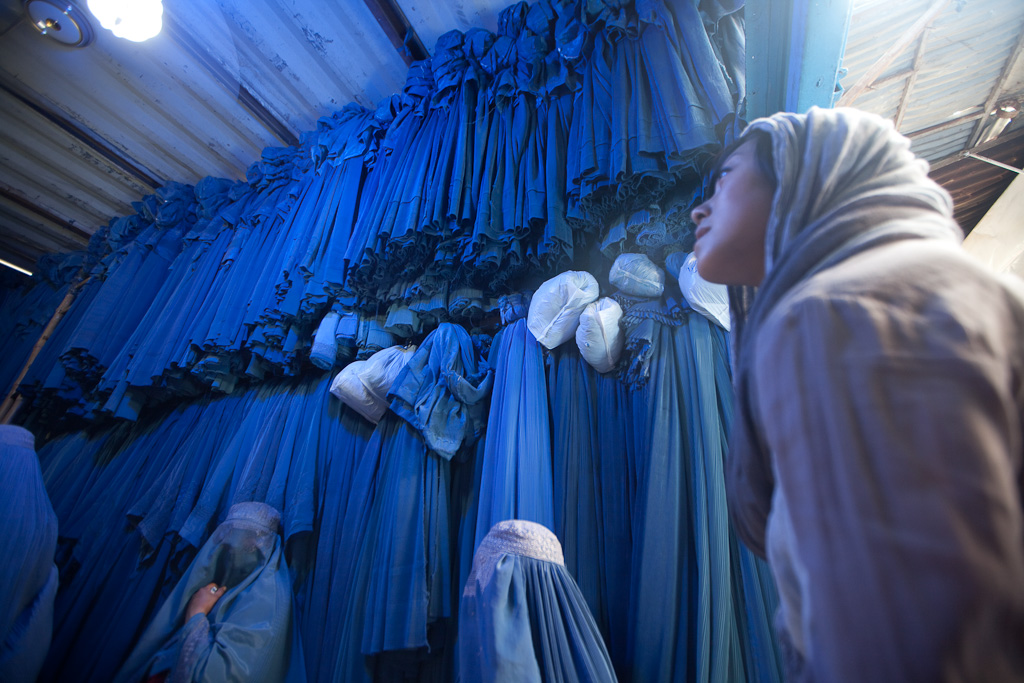
Chadaree in Afghanistan

According to the Salafi point of view, it is obligatory (fard) for a woman to cover her entire body when in public or in presence of non-mahram (i.e men who are not their husbands and intermediate family) men. Some interpretations say that a veil is not compulsory in front of blind men.

The Salafi scholar Muhammad Nasiruddin al-Albani wrote a book expounding his view that the face veil is not a binding obligation upon Muslim women, while he was a teacher at Islamic University of Madinah. His opponents within the Saudi establishment ensured that his contract with the university was allowed to lapse without renewal.

=== Reasons for wearing ===
Reasons for wearing a burqa vary. A woman may choose to wear it to express her piety, modesty, political views, and cultural views among other reasons. A woman may also wear a burqa on being required to do so by law, such as in the case of Afghanistan during the first period of Taliban rule.

The burqa has also been worn in protest. On 17 August 2017, Australian Senator Pauline Hanson wore a burqa, which she claimed "oppresses women", into the Senate, in protest after not getting permission to introduce a bill to ban the burqa and face coverings. Attorney-General George Brandis got a standing ovation from Labor and Greens senators after he gave a speech saying to Hanson: "To ridicule that community, to drive it into a corner, to mock its religious garments is an appalling thing to do." Hanson wore a burqa into the Australian Senate chamber for the second time on 24 November 2025, again calling for a ban on the garment, drawing condemnation from all other parties in the Senate.

== Around the world ==
A map of countries with a burqa ban. Map current as of 2025. Ban in public places Full or partial ban in some localities Ban on sale and manufacturing Ban in some public buildings or in the public workplace

=== Africa ===
==== Cameroon ====
In July 2015, Cameroon's Far North Region banned Islamic face veils, including the burqa, after two female suicide bombers in burqa detonated themselves in Fotokol, killing 13. The ban is now active in five of the country's ten regions.

==== Chad ====
In June 2015, the full face veil was banned in Chad after veiled Boko Haram members disguised as women committed multiple suicide bombings in N'Djamena.

==== Republic of the Congo ====
In May 2015, the Republic of the Congo banned the face veil citing security reasons. The decision was announced by El Hadji Djibril Bopaka, the president of the country's Islamic High Council who stated that "some non-Muslims have been using the full veil to hide and to carry out uncivic acts".

==== Gabon ====
In 2015, Gabon banned the face veil in public and places of work. The authorities said the move was intended to "prevent the risk of suicide attack".

==== Morocco ====
The government distributed letters to businesses on 9 January 2017 declaring a ban on the sale, production and importation of burqas. The letters indicated that businesses were expected to clear their stock within 48 hours.

=== Asia ===
==== Afghanistan ====
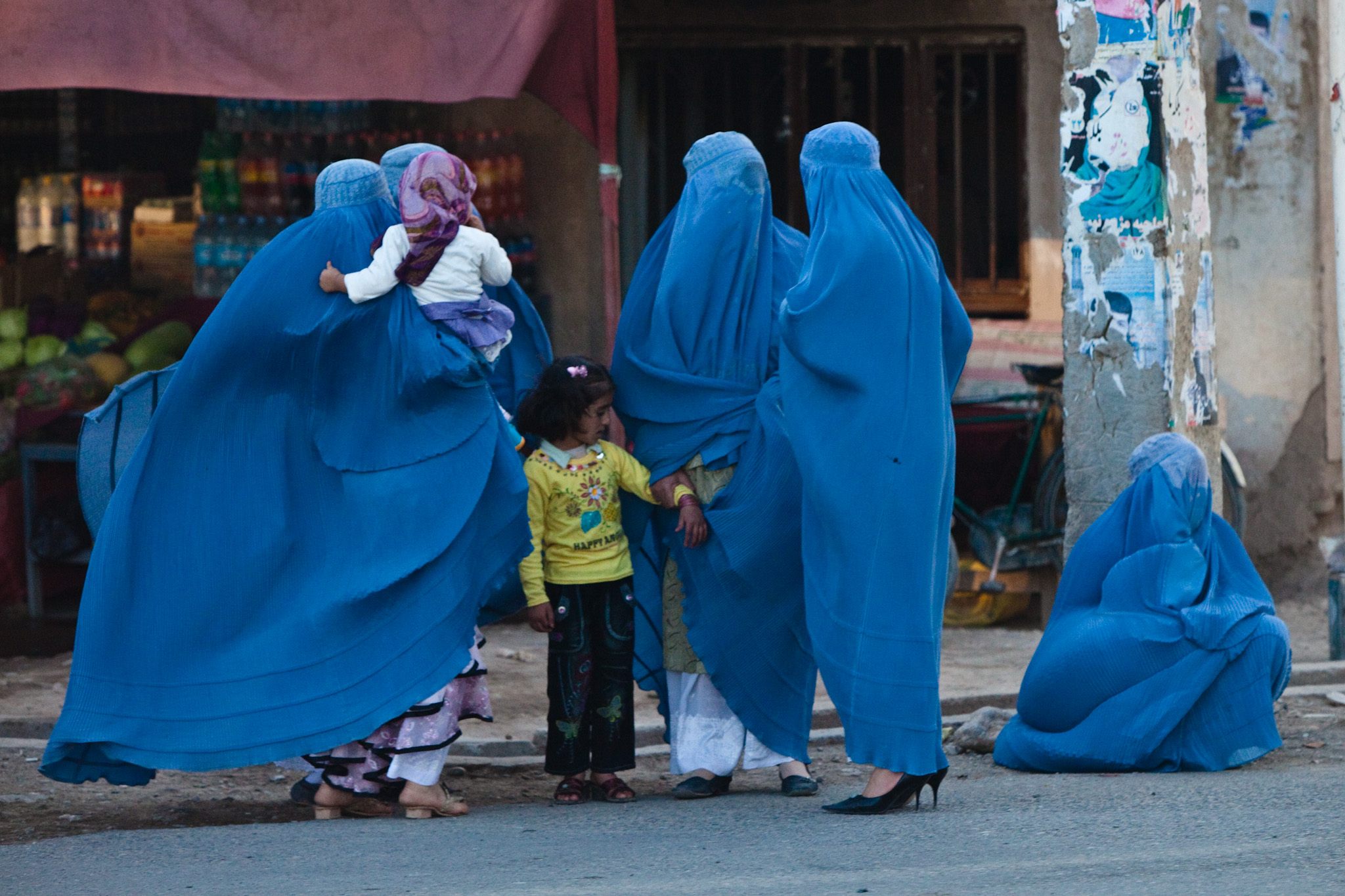
Local Afghan women wearing burqas on a street in 2009

Women wearing burqas of different colors in Afghanistan in 1975

The full Afghan chadaree covers the wearer's entire face except for a small region about the eyes, which is covered by a concealing net or grille. They are usually light blue in the Kabul area, white in the north in Mazar-i-Sharif and brown and green in Kandahar in the south.

Before the Taliban took power in Afghanistan, the chadaree was rarely worn in cities, especially Kabul. While they were in power, the Taliban required the wearing of a chadaree in public. Chadaree use in the remainder of Afghanistan is variable and was observed to be gradually declining in Kabul, until the city fell to the Taliban on 15 August 2021. Due to political instability in these areas, women who might not otherwise be inclined to wear the chadaree must do so as a matter of personal safety, according to Khalid Hanafi. The Taliban, immediately after re-taking Afghanistan, declared that while women may return to work, they must always wear the hijab while outside the house, while the chadaree was not mandatory. In May 2022 the Taliban issued a decree that all women in public must wear a chadaree.

==== Azerbaijan ====
Azerbaijan became the second central Asian country to ban Hijab on 21 September 2026, as the government voted to prohibits clothing elements that disrupt the uniformity of the prescribed school uniform or are inconsistent with the secular principle of general education.

==== China ====
In Xinjiang, regulations adopted in 2017 as part of a region re-esterification framework prohibiting wearing or forcing others to wear face covering Burqa like clothing when classified by authorities as an expression of "extremification". The regulations also instruct personnel in public places and on public transportation to prevent people wearing such face covering from entering and report them to the police. Separate Xinjiang and local regulations restrict face covering veils and certain forms of religious dress. As of 2025, these restrictions remain enforced.

==== India ====
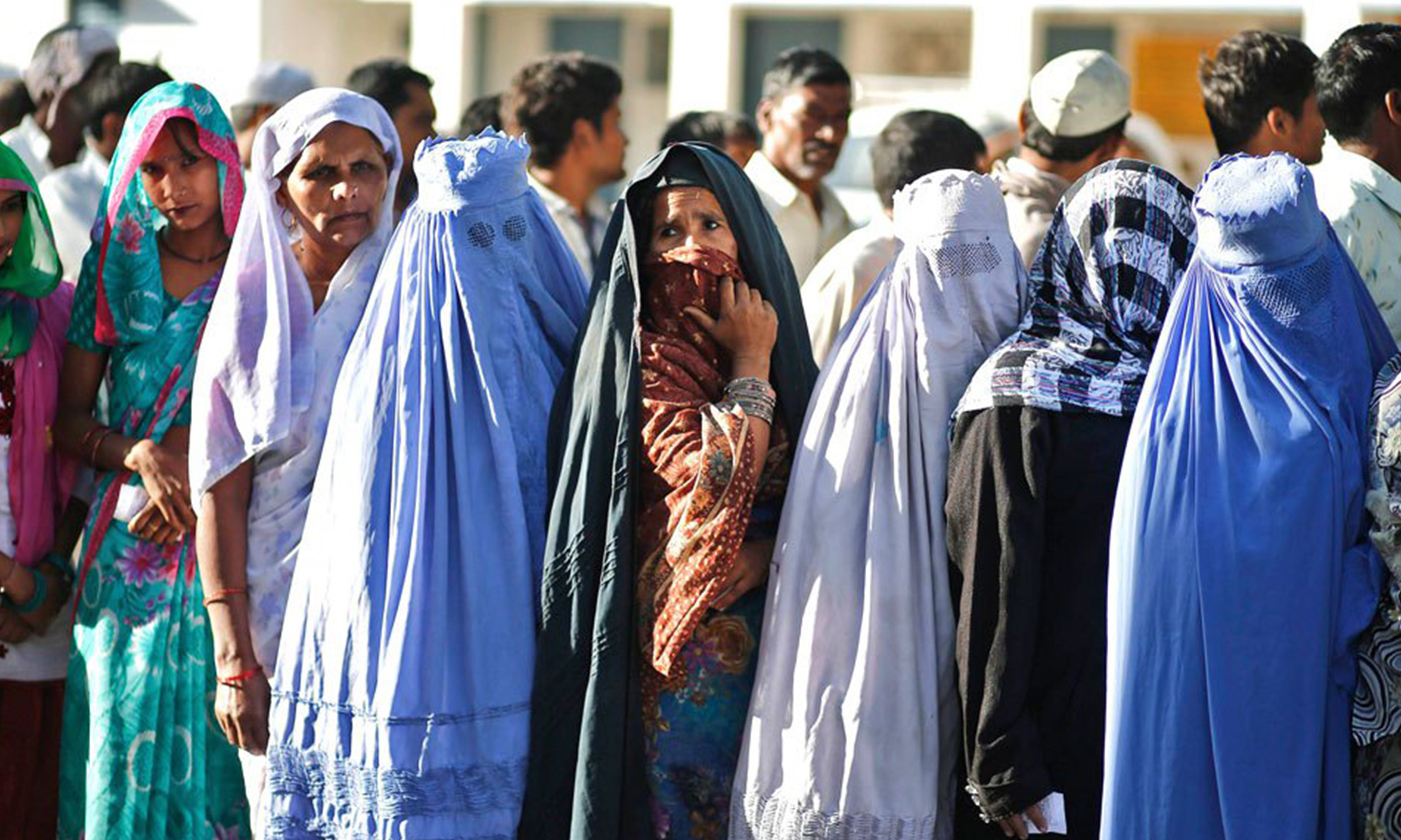
Muslim and Hindu women stand in a queue to cast their votes in Muzaffarnagar.

Among the Muslim population in India (about 14.2% as of the 2011 census), the burqa (Hindi: बुरक़ा, Urdu: بُرقع) was formerly common in many areas, such as Old Delhi, for example. In Nizamuddin Basti, the obligation of a woman to wear a burqa is dependent on her age, according to a local informant: young, unmarried women or young, married women in their first years of marriage are required to wear the burqa. However, after this the husband usually decides if his wife should continue to wear a burqa. In addition, the Indian burqa is a slim black cloak different from the style worn in Afghanistan.

==== Israel ====
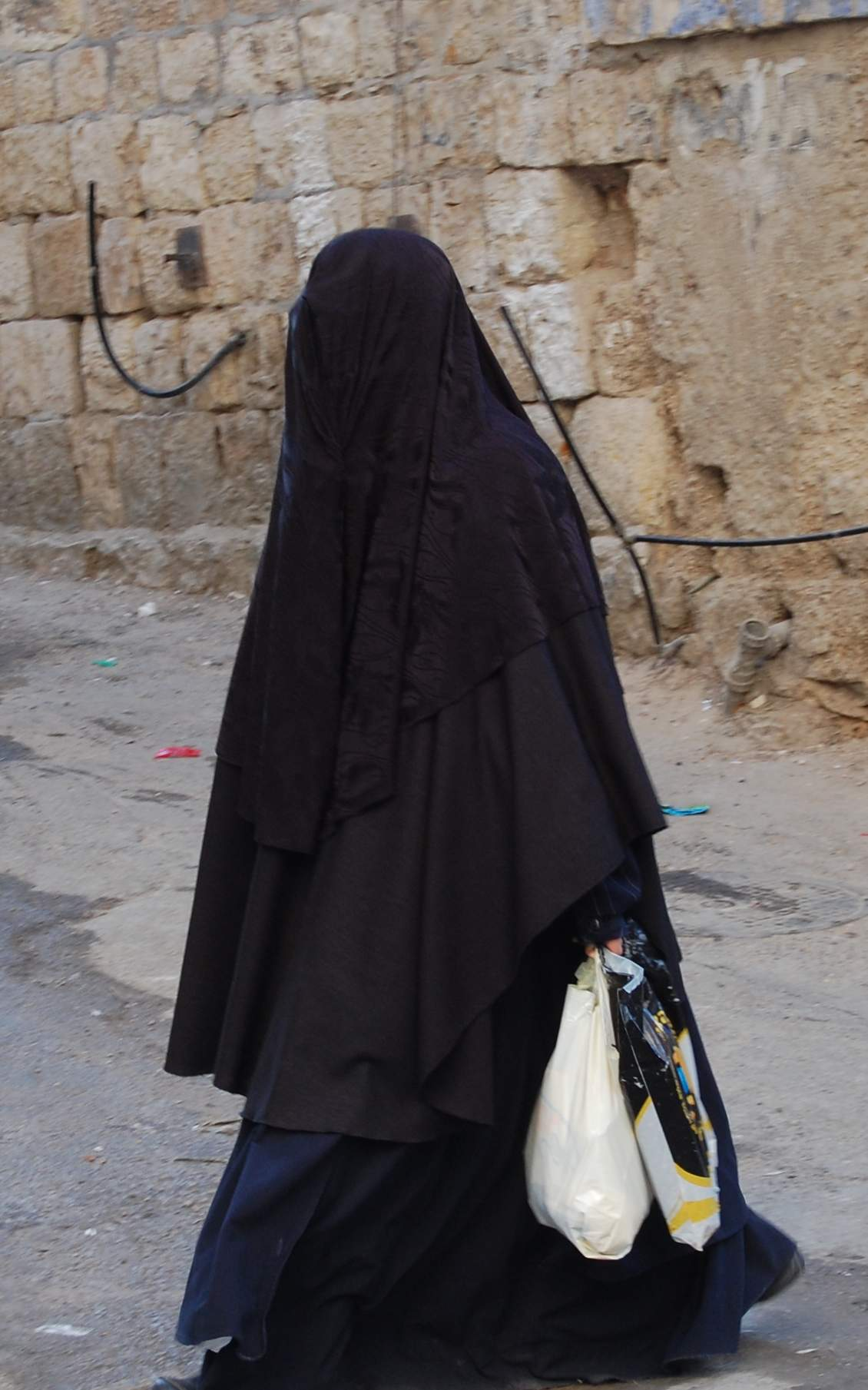
A member of the Haredi burqa sect in Meah Shearim, Israel

A group of Haredi (ultra-Orthodox) Jewish women in Israel began to don the burqa as a symbol of piety. Following its adoption by Bruria Keren, an Israeli religious leader who taught a strict interpretation of Jewish scripture to female adherents, an estimated 600 Jewish women started to wear the veil. Keren claimed to have adopted wearing the burqa to "save men from themselves. A man who sees a woman's body parts is sexually aroused, and this might cause him to commit sin. Even if he doesn't actually sin physically, his impure thoughts are sin in themselves". However, a rabbinical authority said "There is a real danger that by exaggerating, you are doing the opposite of what is intended [resulting in] severe transgressions in sexual matters", and issued an edict declaring burqa-wearing a sexual fetish, and as promiscuous as wearing too little.

According to The Jerusalem Post, in 2010, Marina Solodkin, a member of the Knesset, intended to put forward a bill to "prohibit the wearing of a full-body and face covering for women. [The] bill would not differentiate between Muslims and Jews".

==== Sri Lanka ====
In April 2019, face-covering clothing was banned in Sri Lanka in the aftermath of the 2019 Easter Sunday bombings by jihadists.

==== Syria ====
Syria was a Ba'athist state and discouraged the wearing of hijab. Ghiyath Barakat, Syria's minister of higher education, announced that the government would ban students, teachers or staff from covering faces at universities, stating that the veils ran counter to "secular and academic principles of the country".

==== Tajikistan ====
In 2017 the government of Tajikistan passed a law requiring people to "stick to traditional national clothes and culture", which has been widely seen as an attempt to prevent women from wearing Islamic clothing, in particular the style of headscarf wrapped under the chin, in contrast to the traditional Tajik headscarf tied behind the head.

=== Europe ===
Burqa bans in Europe. Map current as of 2025. National ban – country bans women from wearing full-face veils in public Local ban – cities or regions ban full-face veils Partial ban – government bans full-face veils in some locations

==== Austria ====
In 2017, a legal ban on face-covering clothing in public spaces was adopted by the Austrian parliament including Islamic face-covering garments. The government stated that accepting and respecting Austrian values is essential to the peaceful co-existence between the Austrian majority population and immigrants. The ban came into force on 1 October 2017 and carried a fine of 150 euros. It is reported that there are 150 Austrian women who wear the burqa.

==== Belgium ====
On 29 April 2010, the lower house of parliament in Belgium passed a bill banning any clothing that would obscure the identity of the wearer in places like parks and in the street. The proposal was passed without dissent, and was then also passed by the Senate. BBC News estimated that only "around 30 women wear this kind of veil in Belgium, out of a Muslim population of around half a million". The ban came into effect in Belgium in July 2011. On 11 July 2017, the ban was upheld by the European Court of Human Rights (ECHR) after having been challenged by two Muslim women who claimed their rights had been infringed.

==== Bulgaria ====
The Parliament of Bulgaria outlawed the wearing of any clothing "that partially or completely covers the face" in public places such as government offices, educational and cultural institutions, and places of public recreation, except for health or professional reasons from 30 September 2016. Anyone who violates the law is liable to a fine of up to 1,500 levs (US$860). The Muslim community makes up 15% of the Bulgarian population of 7.1 million.

==== Denmark ====
In autumn 2017, the Danish government agreed to adopt a law prohibiting people to wear "attire and clothing masking the face in such a way that it impairs recognizability". A full ban on both niqabs and burqas was announced on 31 May 2018. The ban came into force on 1 August 2018 and carries a fine of 1000 DKK, then about 134 euro; repeat offenses are punishable with fines up to 10,000 DKK. The law targets all garments that cover the face, such as fake beards or balaclavas. Supporters of the ban claim that the ban facilitates integration of Muslims into Danish society, while Amnesty International claimed the ban violated women's rights. On the date the law came into force, a protest numbering 300-400 people was held in Copenhagen's Nørrebro district organised by Socialist Youth Front, Kvinder i Dialog and Party Rebels, with protesters wearing various head coverings including party masks.

==== France ====
Wearing the burqa has not been allowed in French public schools since 2004, when it was judged to be a religious symbol, similar to the Christian cross, and was outlawed for wear within schools as an application of an established 1905 law that prohibits students and staff from wearing any clearly visible religious symbols. The law relates to the time where the secular French state took over control of most schools from the Catholic Church; it does not apply to private or religious schools. This was followed on 22 June 2009, when the then-President of France, Nicolas Sarkozy, said that burqas were "not welcome" in France, commenting that "In our country, we cannot accept that women be prisoners behind a screen, cut off from all social life, deprived of all identity". The French National Assembly appointed 32 lawmakers from right- and left-wing parties to a six-month fact-finding mission to look at ways of restricting its use. On 26 January 2010, the commission reported that access to public services and public transport should be barred to those wearing the burqa. On 13 July 2010, the Assembly overwhelmingly approved a bill banning burqas and niqabs.

On 14 September 2010, the French Senate overwhelmingly approved a ban on burqas in public, with the law becoming effective beginning on 11 April 2011. When the measure was sent in May to the parliament, it was stated that "Given the damage it produces on those rules which allow the life in community, ensure the dignity of the person and equality between sexes, this practice, even if it is voluntary, cannot be tolerated in any public place".

The ban is officially called "The bill to forbid concealing one's face in public". "It refers neither to Islam nor to veils. Officials insist the law against face-covering is not discriminatory because it would apply to everyone, not just Muslims. They cite a host of exceptions, including motorcycle helmets, or masks for health reasons, fencing, skiing or carnivals".

In 2014, the European Court of Human Rights upheld the French ban on burqas, accepting the argument of the French government that the law was based on "a certain idea of living together".

In 2022, France's top administrative court ruled against allowing body-covering "burkini" swimwear in public pools for religious reasons, arguing that it violates the principle of government neutrality toward religion.

==== Germany ====
In a 2016 speech, accepting her nomination for reelection, the German chancellor Angela Merkel called for banning the burqa in Germany "wherever legally possible", which was interpreted as support for the earlier proposal by Interior Minister Thomas de Maizière to outlaw full-face veils in public buildings. The announcement was seen as an attempt to counter public anger at Merkel's handling of the migrant crisis and electoral gains by the anti-immigration AfD party. In 2017, a legal ban on face-covering clothing for soldiers and state workers during work was approved by the German parliament. Also in 2017, a legal ban on face-covering clothing for car and truck drivers was approved by the German Ministry of Traffic. In July 2017 the state of Bavaria approved a ban on face-covering clothing for teachers, state workers and students at university and schools.

In August 2017, the state of Lower Saxony banned the burqa along with the niqab in public schools. This change in the law was prompted by a Muslim pupil in Osnabrück who wore the garment to school for years and refused to take it off. The law was instituted to prevent similar cases in the future following the completion of her schooling.

In July 2020, the state of Baden-Württemberg banned face-covering veils for pupils, an extension of the ban already in force for school staff.

==== Italy ====
In Italy, by an anti-terrorism law passed in 1975, it is forbidden to wear any dress that hides the face of a person. At that time, Italy was facing domestic (not Islam-related) terrorism. In May 2010, it was reported that a Tunisian woman was fined €500 for this offence. In October 2025, Italian government proposed a bill to forbid islamic face covering.

==== Latvia ====
In 2016, it was wrongly claimed in foreign media that a legal ban of face-covering Islamic clothing was adopted by the Latvian parliament. After long public discussions draft legislation was approved by Latvian government on 22 August 2017; however, it was never adopted by the parliament as a law.

==== Malta ====
Malta has no restrictions on Islamic garments such as the veil (hijab) or the full-face veil (burqa and/or niqab), but face covering in general is illegal. An official ban on face covering for religious reasons is ambiguous. Imam El Sadi stated his belief that banning of the niqab and the burka "offends Muslim women". Elsadi said that the Malteses' attitude towards Muslim women is positive and, despite cultural clashes, they tolerate the dress. Some Muslim women share the belief that it is sinful to be seen in public without veiling themselves; however, they are legally required to remove it when needed.

==== Netherlands ====
On 27 January 2012, a bill was agreed upon by the Dutch cabinet, banning any clothing that would hide the wearer's identity, with potential fines for wearing a burqa in public going up to 380 euros. However, it did not pass in Parliament. In October 2012, this law was mitigated by the succeeding cabinet to pertain only to public transport, health care, education and government buildings, rather than all public spaces.

On 22 May 2015, a bill was agreed upon by the Dutch cabinet, banning wearing a burqa in public places. Public places would have included public transportation, educational institutes, public health institutes, and government buildings. In the courtroom, a burqa or a niqab could not be worn, with both allowed in public spaces. Police officers could have requested one to remove face-covering clothing for identification purposes. There were exceptions, such as during carnival or other festivities, and when face-covering clothing was necessary as a sports or job requirement. Opposition party D66 commented on the burqa abolishment as tokenism, while PVV labelled the ban unsatisfactory. Minister of Internal Affairs, Plasterk, has stated that setting a norm is important.

The May 2015 bill did not pass either, but a new bill was proposed in November 2015, which was eventually made into law. On 26 June 2018, a partial ban on face covering (including burqas) on public transport and in buildings and associated yards of educational institutions, governmental institutions and healthcare institutions was enacted, with a number of exceptions. From 1 August 2019 a national burka ban was introduced in the Netherlands.

As of August 2019, 200-400 Dutch women were believed to wear a burqa or niqab.

==== Norway ====
In June 2018, the parliament of Norway passed a bill banning clothing covering the face at educational institutions as well as daycare centres, which included face-covering Islamic veils. The prohibition applies to pupils and staff alike.

==== Portugal ====
In October 2025, parliament in Portugal passed a bill banning clothing covering the face. On 19 August, 2026, Portugal enacted the law banning face covering in public.

==== Sweden ====
In December 2019, the municipality of Skurup banned Islamic veils in educational institutions. Earlier, the municipality of Staffanstorp approved a similar ban. The ban was overturned by the Supreme Administrative Court in December 2022 since it was deemed to be a violation religious freedoms as defined in the Fundamental Law on Freedom of Expression.

In 2012, a poll by Uppsala University found that Swedes responded that face-covering Islamic veils are either completely unacceptable or fairly unacceptable, 85% for the burqa and 81% for the niqab. The researchers noted these figures represented a compact resistance to the face-covering veil by the population of Sweden.

==== Switzerland ====
The burqa was outlawed in the canton of Ticino after a citizen initiative to hold a referendum. With 65% in favour of a ban, it was ruled that the ban was constitutional, and took effect in July 2016. Those who violate the law face a fine of up to CHF 10,000.

In September 2018, a ban on face-covering veils was approved with a 67% vote in favour in the canton of St. Gallen. The largest Islamic community organisation in Switzerland, the Islamic Central Council, recommended that Muslim women continue to cover their faces.

During the federal votation of the 7 March 2021 regarding the prohibition of face-covering, the Swiss people voted for the prohibition. The question submitted for the referendum was initiated from a right-wing political group affiliated with the Swiss People's Party. Although very few women in Switzerland actually wear a burqa or niqab, the proposition has been made with the intention to forbid these outfits in public spaces. 51.4% of the population participated in the vote, 51.2% of them agreed with the initiative.

==== United Kingdom ====
Face veils have caused debate in the United Kingdom. In 2006, Jack Straw, who was the Labour MP for Blackburn at the time, attracted controversy after asking Muslim women from his constituency to remove any veils covering their faces during face-to-face constituency surgeries. Straw explained to the media that a female staffer would remain in the room during any potential meeting, however the public reaction to the decision was varied. Some Muslim groups said that they understood his concerns, whilst others rejected his request as prejudicial to Muslim women. A poll in 2011 indicated that 66 per cent of British people supported banning the burqa in all public places. However, a ban on burqas was ruled out by the Conservative government, and in 2018 Theresa May stated "we do not support a ban on the wearing of the veil in public".

In 2018, Boris Johnson described women who wear the burqa as looking "like letterboxes". His comments were condemned by politicians from across the political spectrum. This included members of his own party, such as then-prime minister, Theresa May, Dominic Grieve, and Baroness Warsi, as well as Labour MPs including Jess Phillips, David Lammy, and Stella Creasy. In the week after Johnson's comments, Islamophobic incidents rose by 375 percent.

In 2025 Reform UK MP Sarah Pochin called for Prime Minister Keir Starmer to ban the burka during PMQs.

=== Oceania ===
==== Australia ====
In 2010, Australian Liberal Senator Cory Bernardi called for the burqa to be banned in Australia, branding it "un-Australian". The ban did not go ahead, but the debate about the burqa continues.

In 2011, Carnita Matthews of Sydney was sentenced to six months jail for making a statement accusing a police officer of attempting to forcibly lift her niqab, which news sources initially referred to incorrectly as a burqa. The officer had pulled her over for a random breath test and then ticketed her for a licence infringement. Matthews allegedly then submitted a signed complaint to a police station while wearing a niqab. Judge Clive Jeffreys overturned the conviction in June 2011, citing what he thought were differences between the signature on her license and that on the complaint. She then proceeded to seek legal costs. Matthews was subsequently revealed to have a considerable record of unpaid fines and licence revocations that cast doubt on her character.

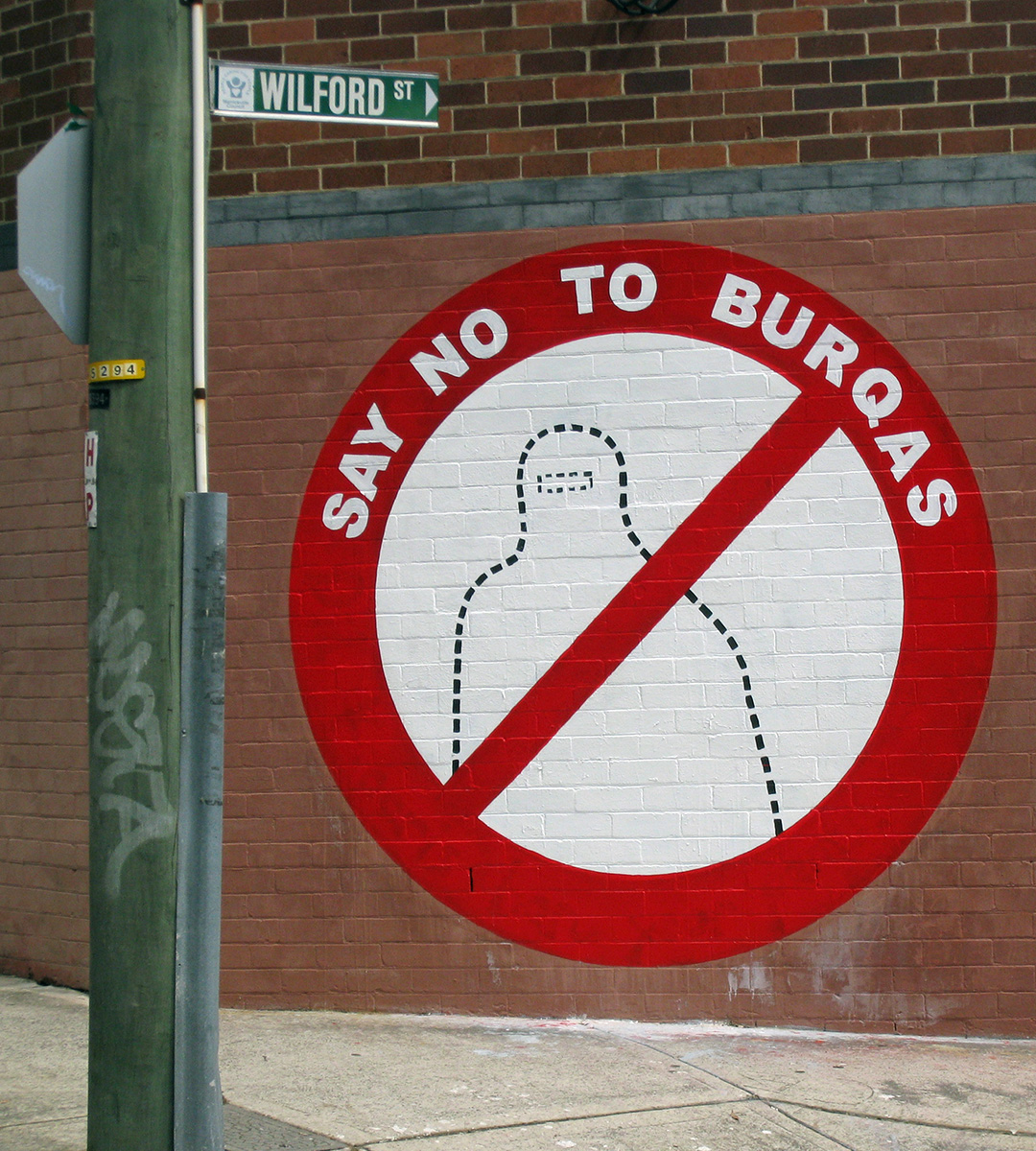
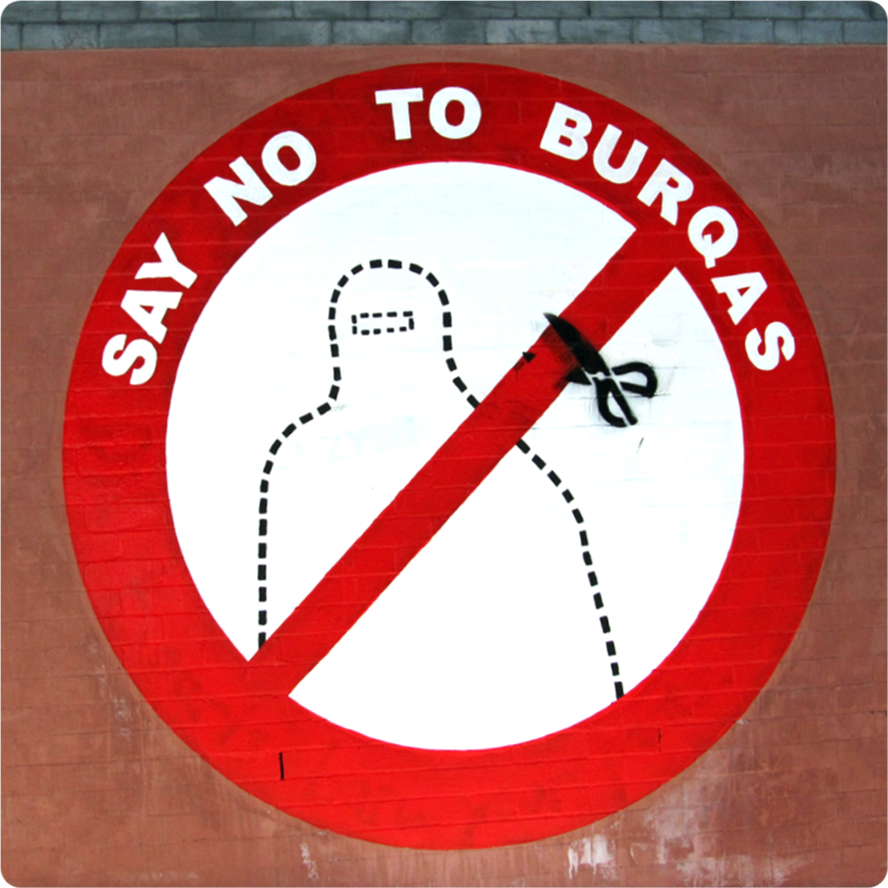
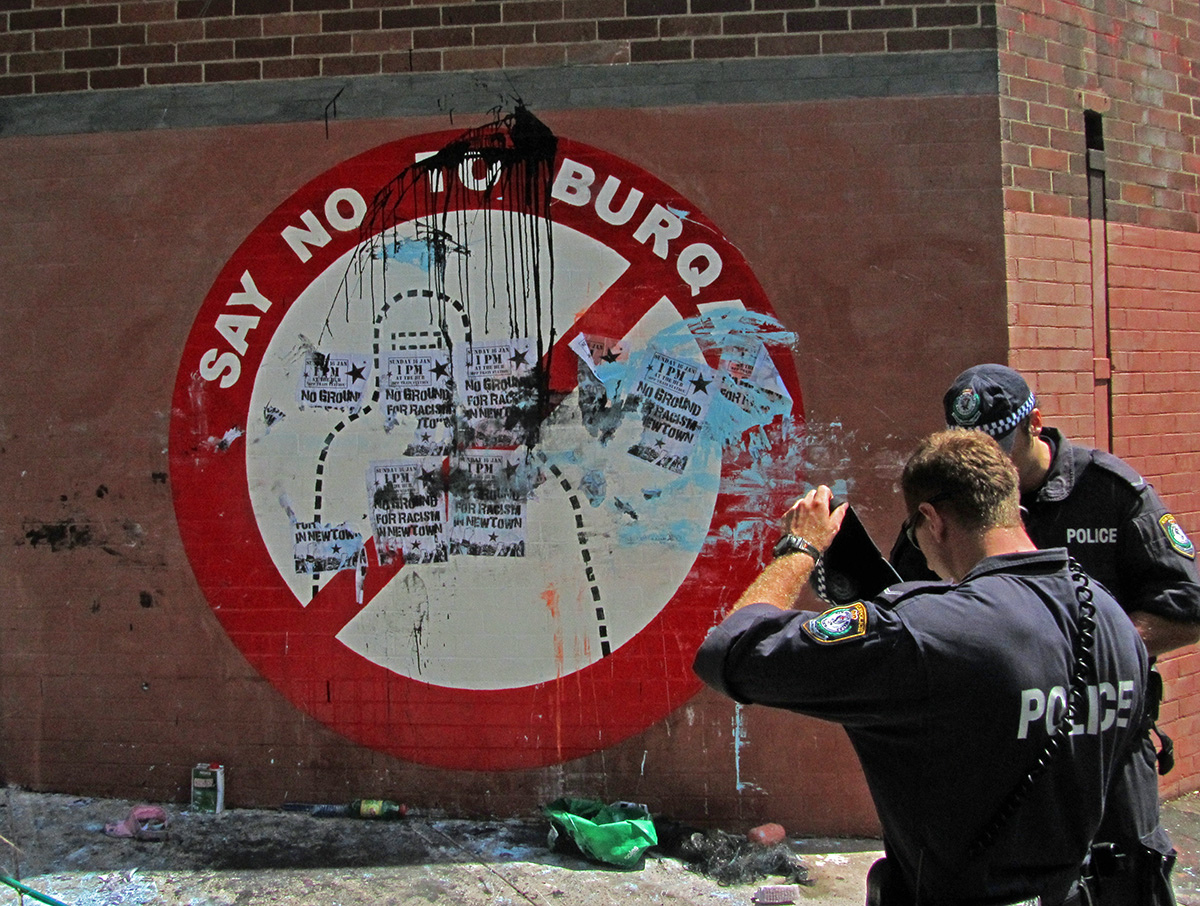
"Say no to burqas" mural in Newtown, New South Wales, before (left), modification (middle) and vandalism (right)

On 4 July 2011, New South Wales became the first Australian state to pass laws allowing police to demand that burqas (and other headgear such as motorcycle helmets) be removed when asking for identification.

In October 2014, the Speaker of the House and President of the Senate at Parliament House in Canberra decreed that female visitors wearing a face covering would have to sit in the separated glassed-in areas of the public gallery normally reserved for schoolchildren. This was in response to a planned disruptive action by a political activist group. Prime Minister Tony Abbott stated that he opposed this restriction. The decision was subsequently reversed.

In August 2017, Senator Pauline Hanson arrived at the Senate wearing a burqa in protest, calling for the garment to be banned. Following the incident, ReachTEL polled 2,832 Australians and found that 56.3% supported banning the wearing of the burqa in public places. Ms Hanson wore a burqa into parliament as protest on a subsequent occasion in 2025

== See also ==
- Abaya – Garment worn by Muslim women
- Anti-mask laws – Laws against concealing one's face in public
- Burqa ban
- Burqini – Swimsuit
- Chador – Traditional Iranian female garment
- Christian clothing – Dress codes among Christian worshippers
- Cowl – Long, hooded garment worn over religious habits
- Ghoonghat – Traditional South Asian Hindu headscarf
- Hijab – Islamic head covering for women
- Islam and clothing – Customs of clothing associated with Islam
- Jewish religious clothing
- List of religious headgear
- List of types of sartorial hijab
- Niqāb – Women's garment in Muslim societies
- Paranja – Central Asian article of clothing
- Religious clothing – Dress which has a special significance to a faith group
- Women and religion – Women's roles and history surrounding religion
- Women in Christianity
- Women in Islam
- Women in Judaism
- Yashmak – Turkish and Turkmen type of veil or niqab worn by women
