= Boshiya =

Woman's full-face black veil

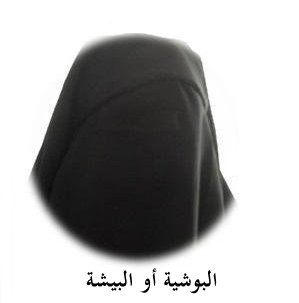
Boshiya

A boshiya (also called a bushiyyah or ghatwa) is a Middle Eastern garment that, though see-through by the wearer, covers the wearer's face completely by a veil without openings for their eyes. It is traditionally worn with an abaya or other overgarment.

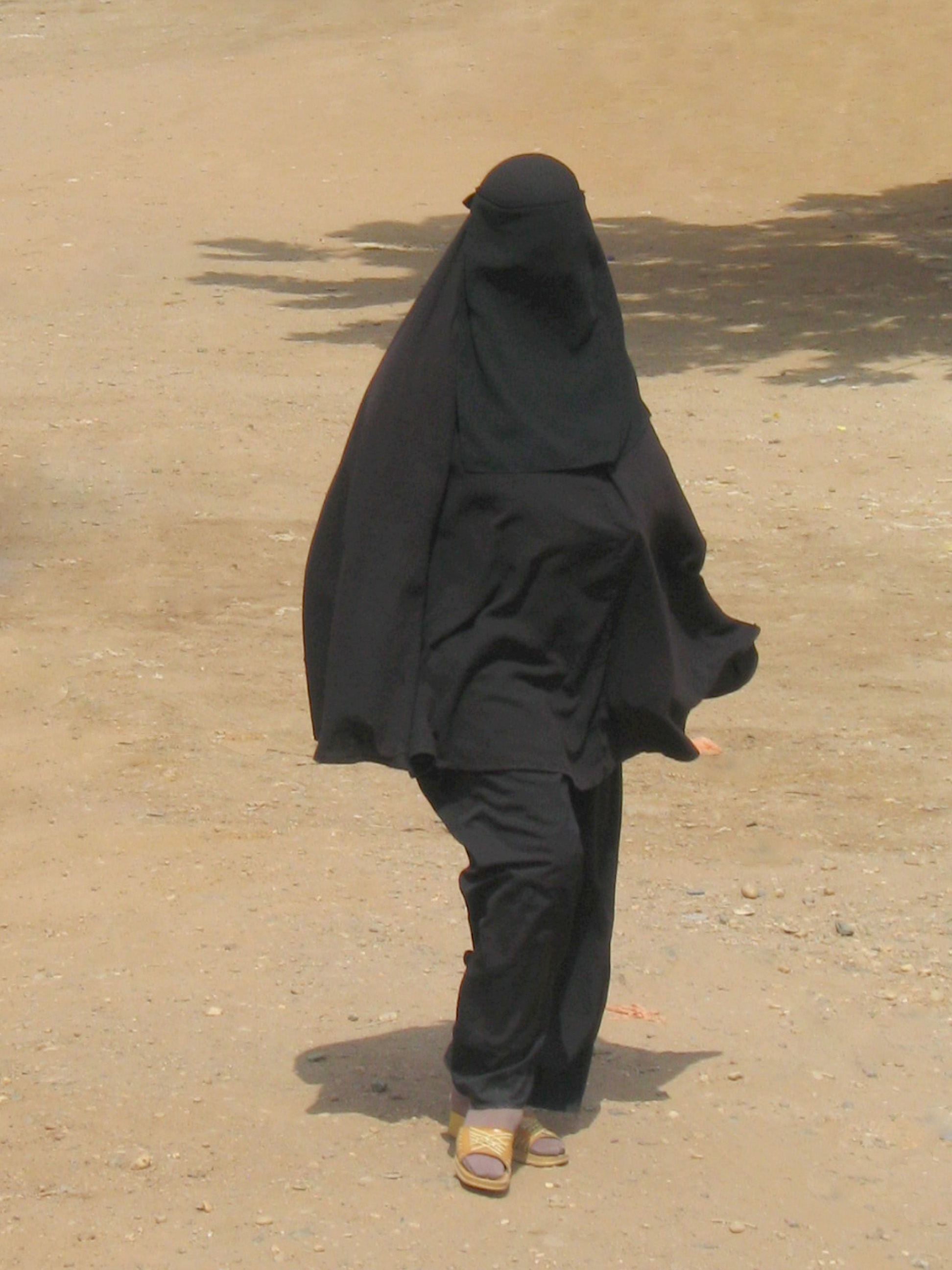
A woman in Sudan wearing a boshiya

== Design ==
A boshiyah is essentially a large square of thin cotton gauze-like material with ties at the top that sits at the top of the forehead (either under or over the wearer's headscarf) and drapes down over the entire face. When flipped up, the garment exposes the wearer's face in its entirety. A boshiyah is normally not as opaque and covering as a traditional niqab; it can also be worn to supplement a half-style niqab or, if the wearer desires extra modesty, around non-related males.

== See also ==
- Burqa
- Types of hijab

== Sources ==
- Mary Zeiss Stange; Carol K. Oyster; Jane E. Sloan (23 February 2011). Encyclopedia of Women in Today's World. SAGE Publications. p. 1513. ISBN 978-1-4129-7685-5.
