= Safseri =

Traditional Tunisian veil worn by women

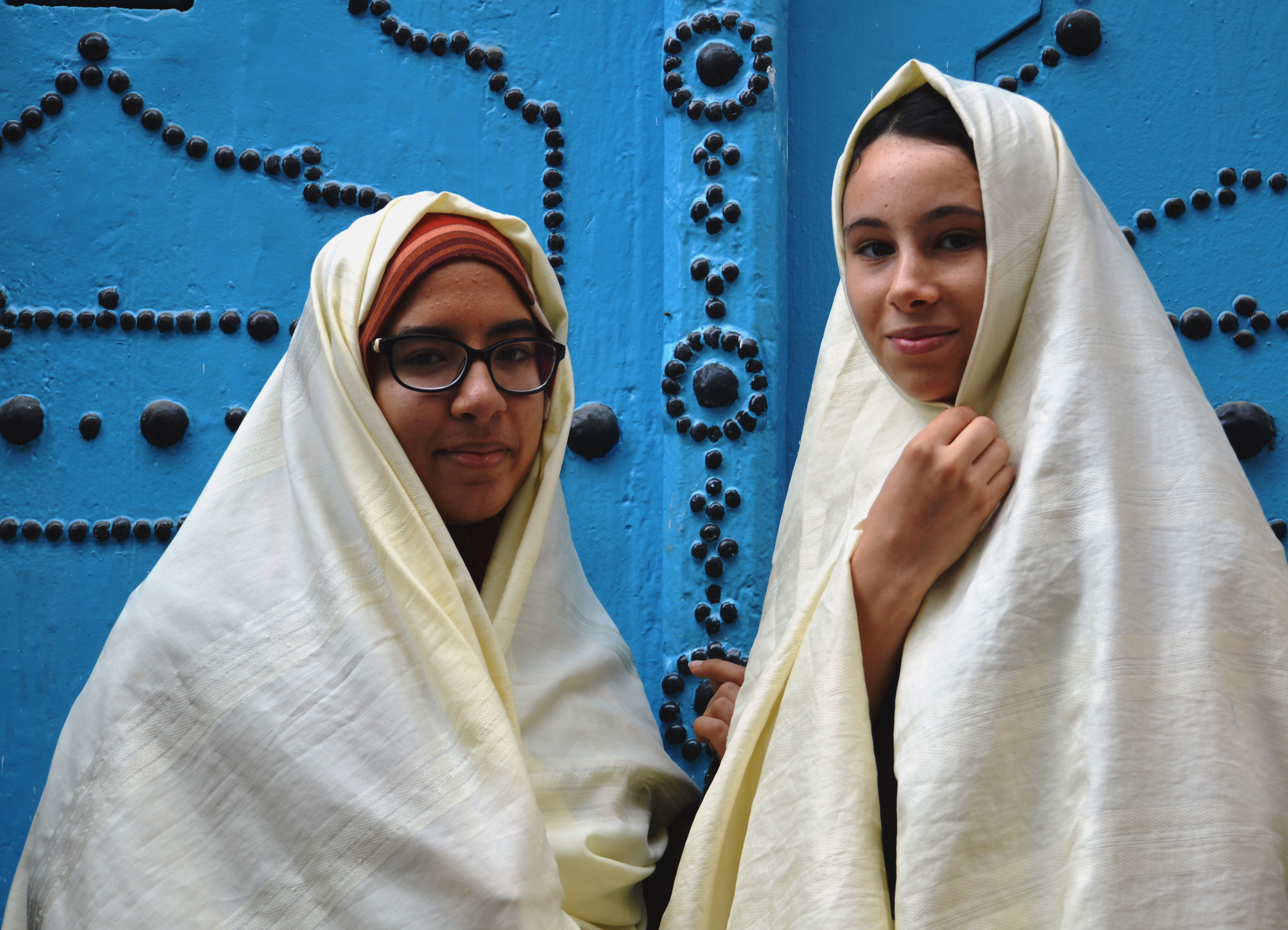
Two Tunisian women wearing a safseri

The safseri (Tunisian Arabic: سفساري), sometimes also spelled sefseri, safsari or sefsari, is a traditional Tunisian veil worn by women. Not to be confused with Chador or Dupatta, it is a unique cloth to Tunisia.

== Composition ==
The safseri is composed of a large piece of cloth covering the whole body. It usually has a cream colour and is made of cotton, satin or silk.

Depending on the regions of Tunisia, it can also be very colorful, especially in the south of the country.

== Wear ==
It is worn by women out of modesty to avoid male looks. In contemporary Tunisia, this cloth is mostly worn by senior women. Often a grandmother wears it while her daughter will not wear it. After the hijab was banned in Tunisia, some women began to wear the safseri. As a result, the president Habib Bourguiba had tried, in vain, to have people abandon its use.

The cloth is today largely abandoned.
