= Kimeshek =

Central Asian traditional headgear

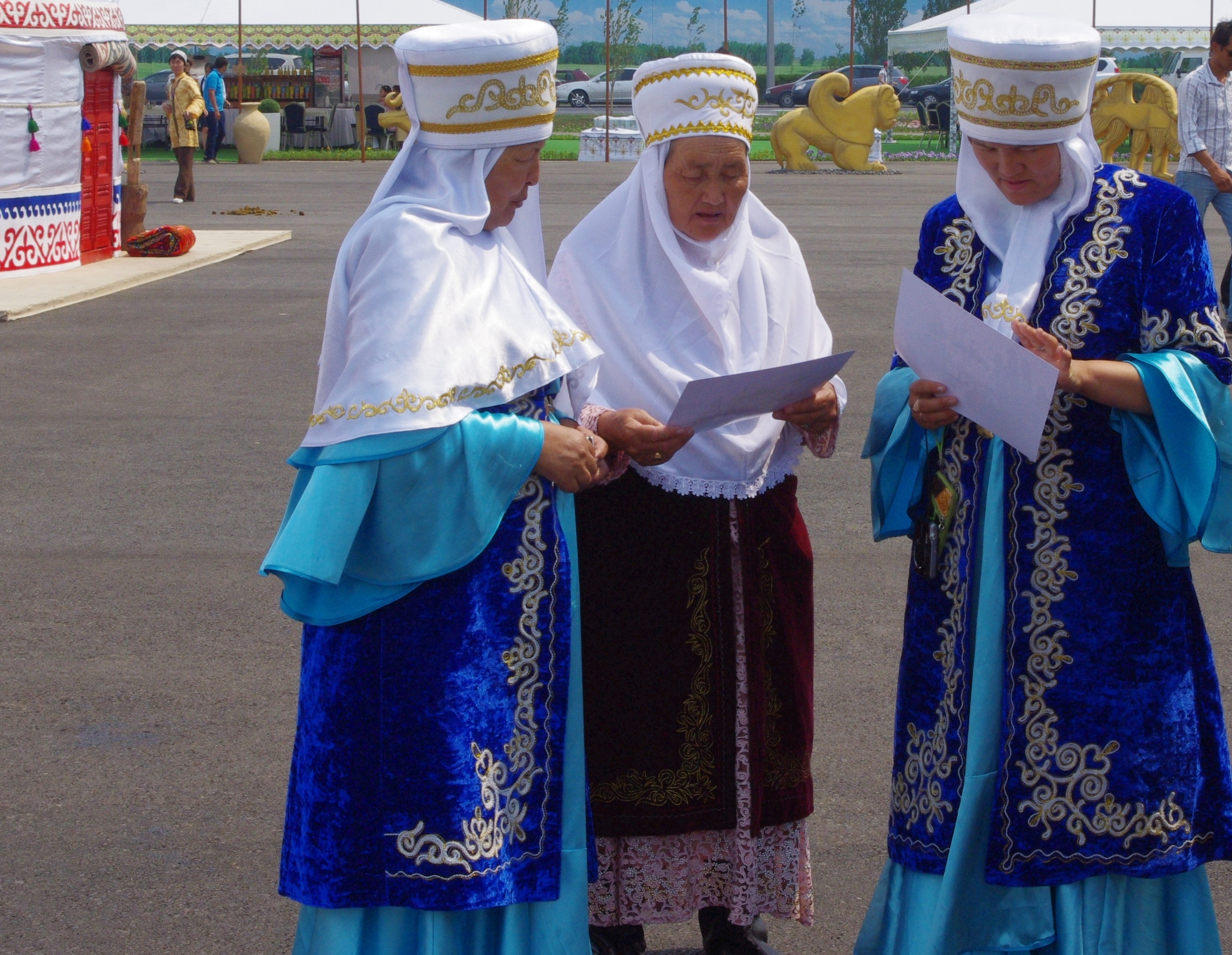
- Kazakh women wearing kimeshek
- Type: Hat
- Place of origin: Kazakhstan, Karakalpakstan (Uzbekistan), and Kyrgyzstan

Elechek, Kyrgyz female headwear: traditional knowledge and rituals
- UNESCO Intangible Cultural Heritage
- Country: Kyrgyzstan
- Reference: 01985
- Region: Asia and the Pacific

Inscription history
- Inscription: 2023 (18th session)
- List: Representative

Kimeshek (Kazakh: кимешек, Karakalpak: кимешек) or Elechek (Kyrgyz: элечек) is a traditional headgear of married women with children in Kazakhstan, Karakalpakstan (Uzbekistan) and Kyrgyzstan. Kimeshek is also worn by Central Asian Jewish women. Uzbek and Tajik women wear a similar headdress called lachak. Kimeshek is made of white cloth, and the edge is full of patterns. Kimeshek might have different designs and colors based on the wearer's social status, age, and family.

In Karakalpakstan, there are two different types of kimeshek. Like in Kazakhstan, only married women wear kimeshek. A red kimeshek, or qızıl kiymeshek, was worn by a younger married woman. A girl preparing for marriage would make the kimeshek herself. As the woman grew older, she would instead wear a white aq kiymeshek. However, she would keep the red kimeshek. The kimeshek was considered very important; it was taboo to give one away.

== Gallery ==
Elechek

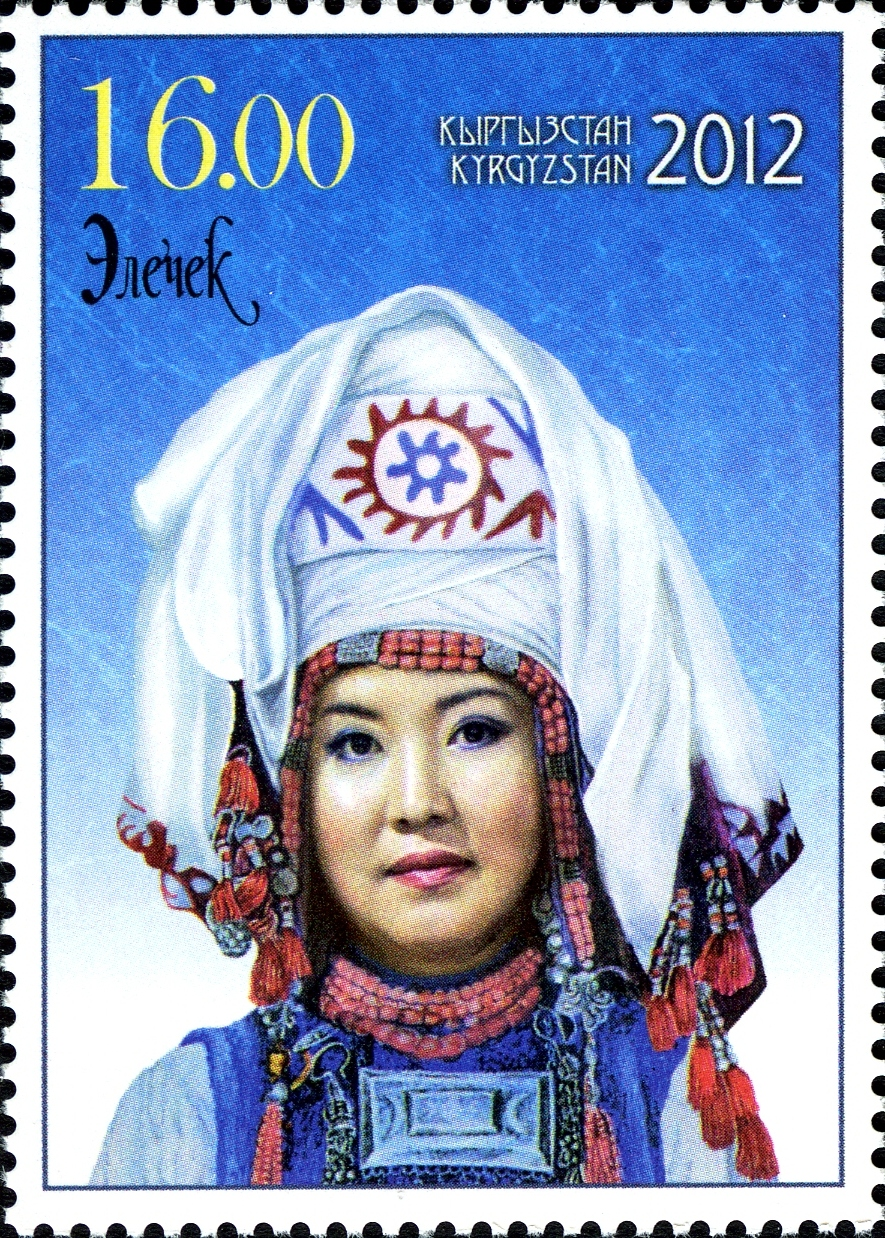

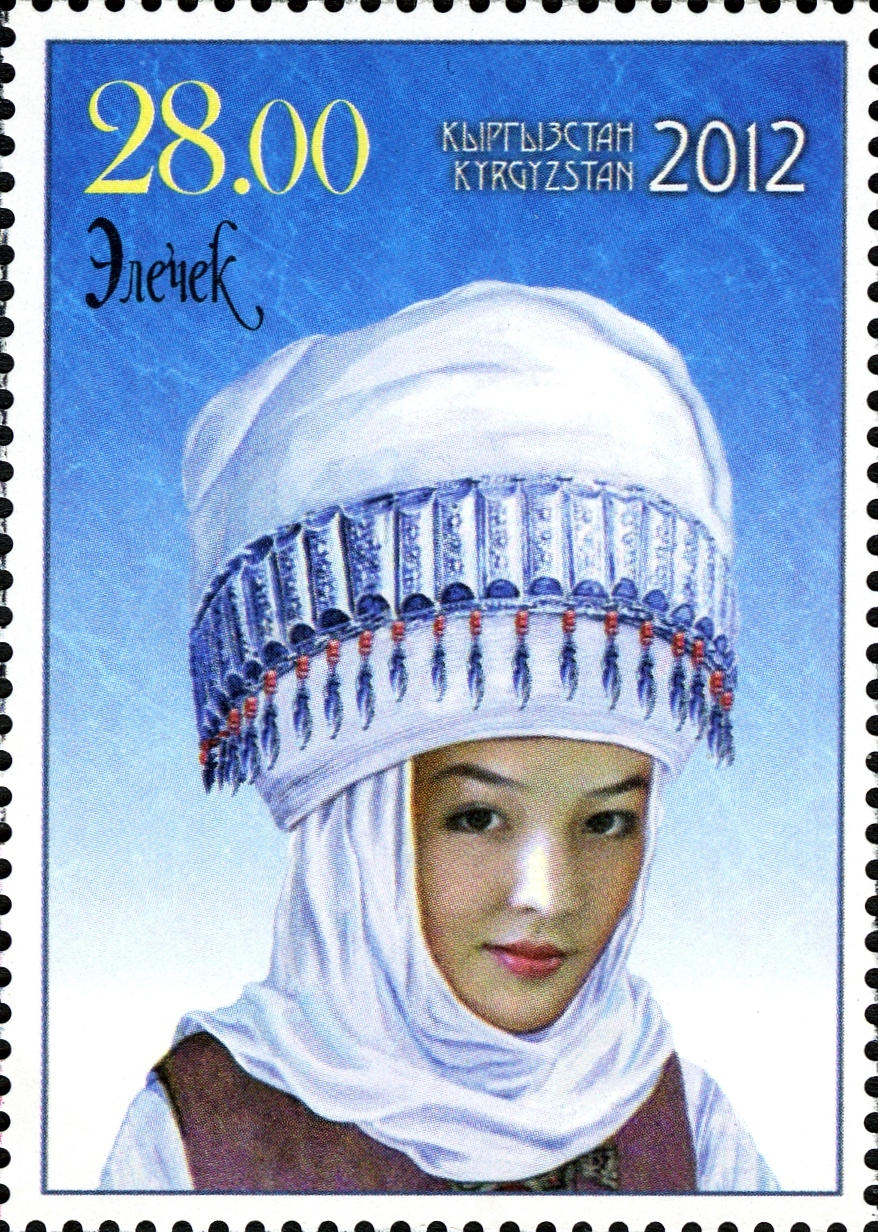

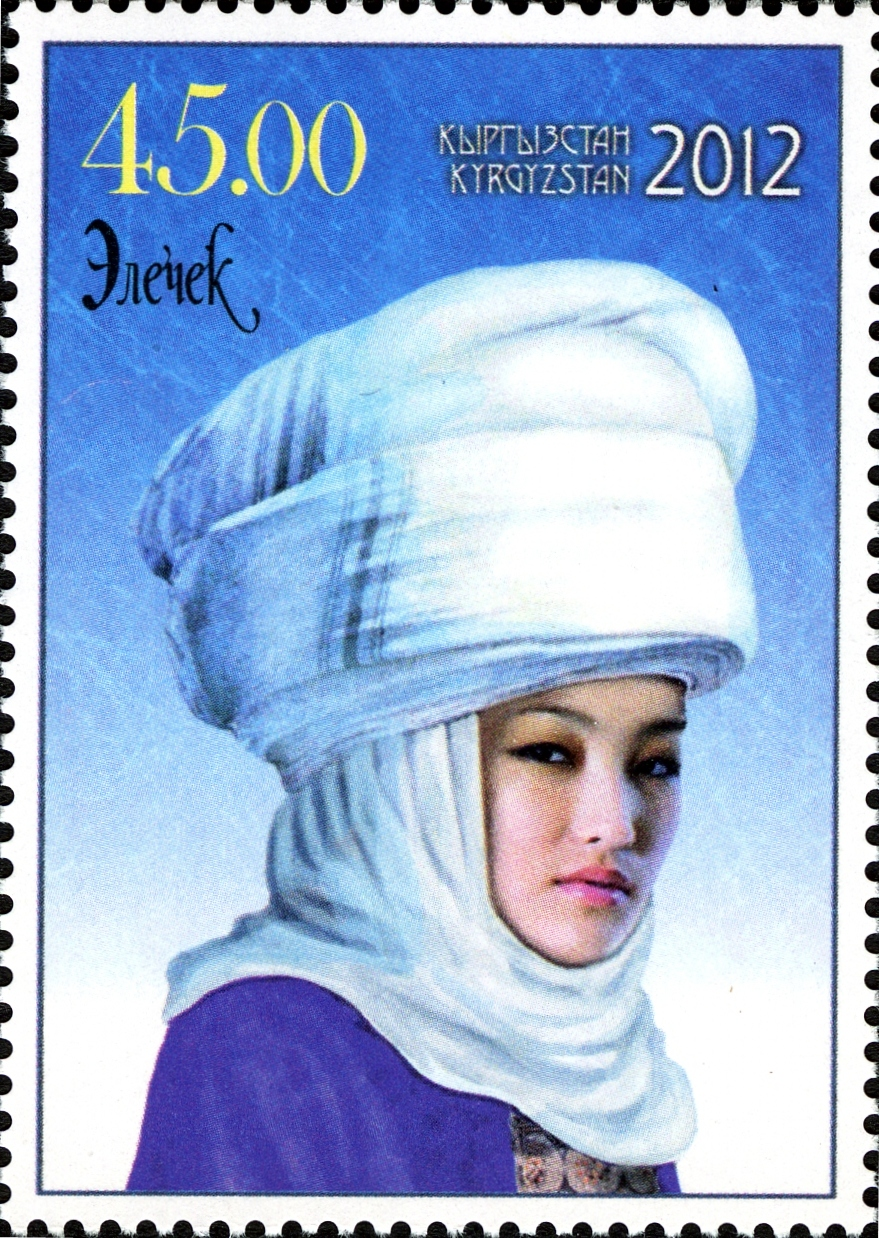

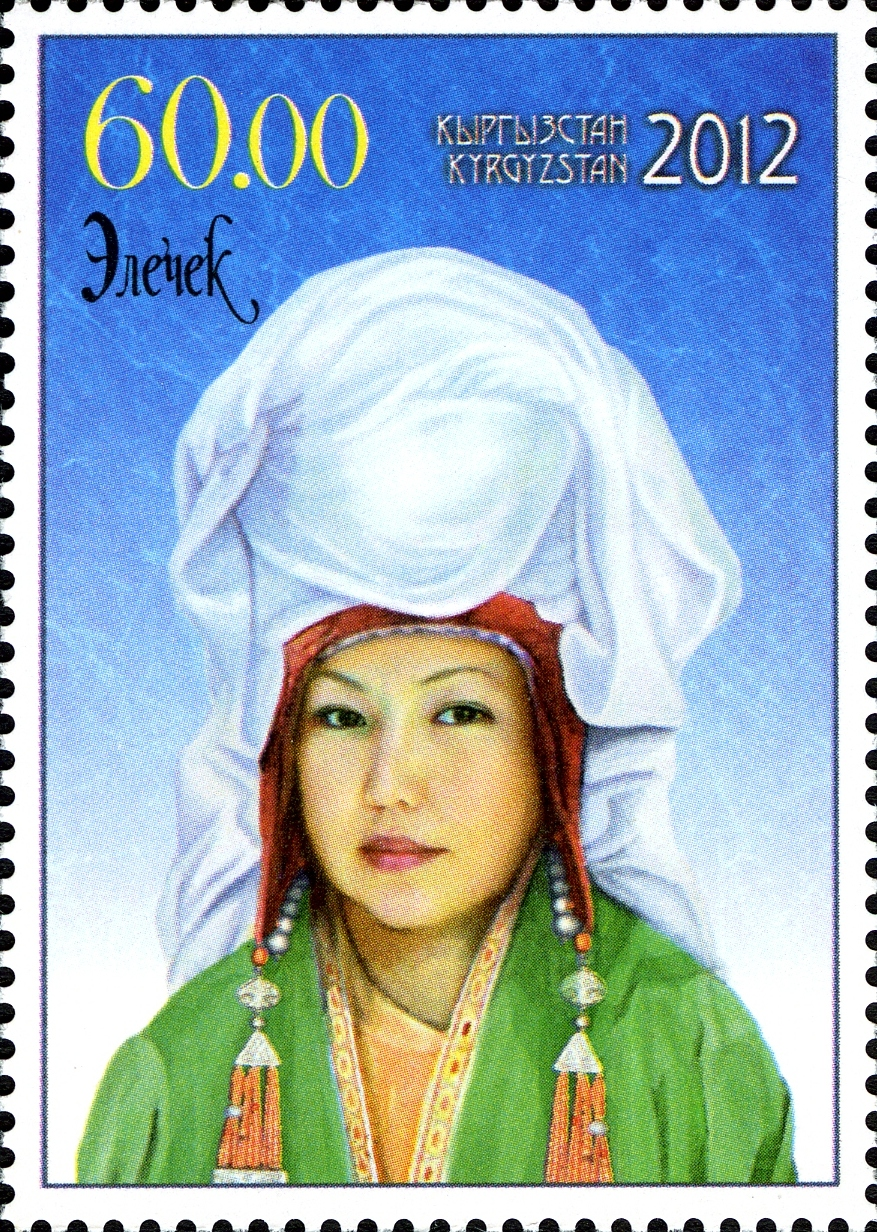
Kimeshek
