= British military dress in the 18th century =

British military dress in the 18th century was characterised by a variety of colorful distinguishing features. The two dominant colors were red for the cavalry and infantry, and blue for the artillery and the navy. Legwear and footwear underwent only minor changes. Until the end of the century, these consisted of simple shoes or leather boots and knee-length breeches. Headgear underwent more changes. While the tricorn was worn throughout the century, the bicorn became increasingly popular among officers in the 1790s. In addition, the grenadiers' mitre was replaced by a fur cap, and the Tarleton became the preferred headgear for the light infantry.

== Development ==
=== Infantry ===
The standardised uniform appeared with the, ever-increasing use of firearms in the late 17th century in order the find means to distinguish friend from enemy. By then the jerkin the principal garment up till then was gradually replaced by the justaucorps. Unlike the jerkin, which featured only a few colour variations, the cloth coat had a lining in a different colour, which was visible at the turned-up cuffs, the hem and the lapels, and eventually became the basis for the tunic or uniform jacket, that featured facings of another color. A further feature for distinguish them were colored stitching around the buttonholes, and the colored tape binding sometimes put around them. Since there were no rank insignia officers could only recognized by the better quality of their dress.

Under Queen Anne, standardized dress regulations for the British infantry were established beginning in 1708, which were largely based on those of the previous era. Soldiers received a fixed annual allotment consisting of a tunic, vest, trousers, shoes, and a hat, with noncommissioned officers and drummers given higher-quality clothing. Over the course of this period, the troops’ appearance changed. Hats were cut open on three sides, while the grenadiers’ caps evolved into a distinctive, pointed miter shape. While officers continued to wear long, flowing wigs, the hair of ordinary soldiers was cut shorter and tied at the nape of the neck. The uniform tunic was worn open at the chest to reveal the vest; unused buttons at the bottom were completely omitted. In addition to their weapons, white gaiters became mandatory equipment starting in 1710.

Inspired by the Duke of Marlborough, stricter uniform regulations were enacted beginning in 1710, which also mandated uniform red attire for officers as well as the mandatory wearing of a sash and a sponton. A decree issued in 1727 permanently established the uniforms and insignia colors of the regiments, so that any change from that point on required express royal approval. By 1715, Hanoverian symbols found their way into the British Army, including the black cockade on the hat and the white horse on the grenadier caps. The latter now uniformly took on the characteristic miter shape, while the heraldic insignia of the regimental proprietors under George II were gradually replaced by royal ciphers.

By the late 1720s, the front panels of the coats had gradually evolved into fixed lapels that were permanently buttoned down to the waist, with the edges and buttonholes trimmed with lace. To facilitate movement while marching, the corners of the coat tails were turned up and fastened with a button starting in 1737. To further standardize the British Army, a central dress manual was published in 1742 under the Duke of Cumberland. For the first time, it illustrated the uniforms and specific insignia of all regiments and definitively abolished the use of private coats of arms by regiment owners, replacing them with royal symbols such as the king’s monogram or the white horse.

During the reign of George II, soldiers’ uniform coats were characterized by an enormous amount of fabric. This excess fabric was gathered into side pleats below the hip button, so that in many cases the coats looked more like overcoats. Contemporary paintings by Morier illustrate that the lower front edge of the uniform tunic had a rounded cut when the soldiers wore the lapels buttoned over one another. When the lapels were turned back, however, the lower edge had a distinctly straighter cut. Officers often threaded their swords through a specific opening in the pleats, which was specially stiffened to give the fabric more body and volume. For enlisted soldiers, there is evidence of a buttoned fabric trim within these pleats.

Range of uniforms before the royal warrant of 1768
Private of the 33rd regiment in 1742 with red coat, red breeches and white turnback skirts

Private of the 12th regiment in 1742 with red coat, red breeches and buff skirts and cuffs

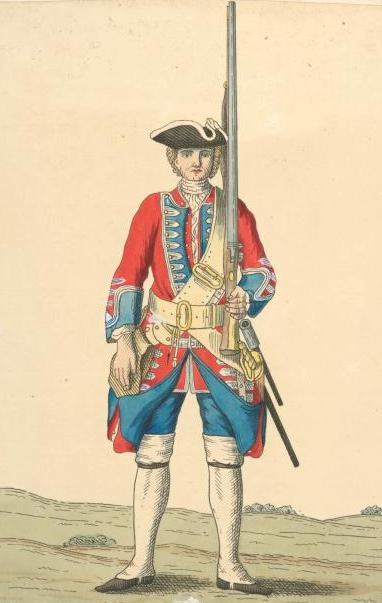
Private of the 9th regiment in 1742 with read coat, blue cuffs lapels and breeches

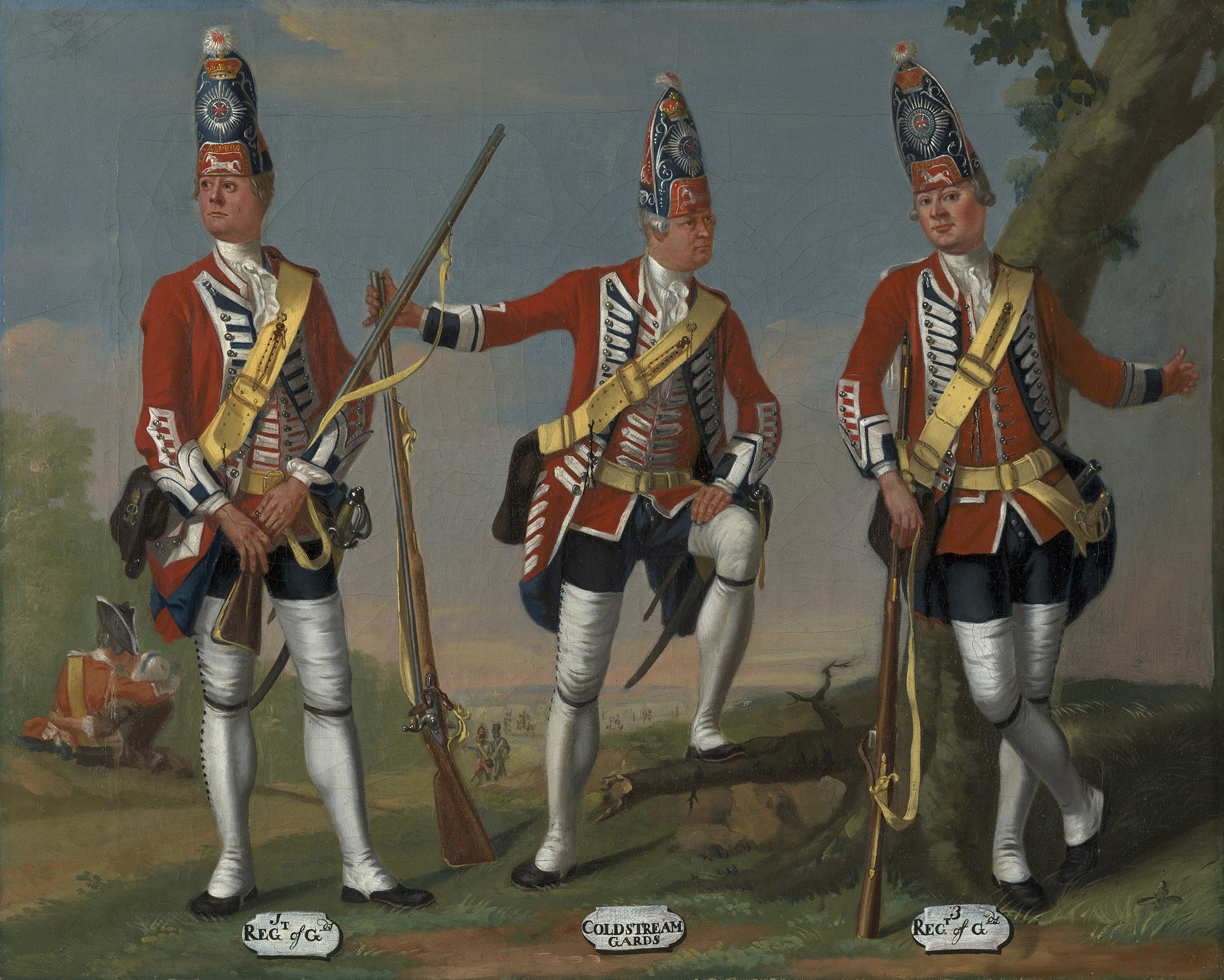
Grenadiers of the 1st and 3rd Regiments of Foot Guards and Coldstream Guards in 1751 with red coats, blue cuffs lapels and breeches

The epaulettes were originally made of red fabric, had a rounded shape, and were worn exclusively on the left shoulder. Some regiments anticipated later regulations by already using epaulets trimmed with braid. The number of bows on the tail flaps varied between four and seven; they were either square or pointed in shape. Grenadiers also wore distinctive wing-shaped epaulets. On the back, the coats featured lacing, a very large pleat, and tail flaps with so-called Dubby ornaments, which were often fastened with hooks and eyes.

The royal decree of December 1768 introduced strict dress regulations for the infantry. The regiments of the Foot Guards were exempt from this decree; they did not change their uniforms until later, between 1768 and 1774. The fabric for the rank-and-file soldiers was dyed madder red, while a finer scarlet was used for noncommissioned officers. The respective regimental color was featured on the collar, lapels, and cuffs. The skirts lost most of their fullness in the pleats. They were permanently turned back and secured as white lapels with heart-, diamond-, or square-shaped ornaments. An exception was made for regiments with buff or buff-toned lapels, where the facings, vests, and lining were also in the same tone. Ordinary soldiers used brass lapel ornaments, grenadiers wore grenade emblems, and regiments with corresponding traditional affiliations used thistles.

When worn as a dress, the jacket was fastened at the chest with hooks, leaving the upper part open so that the batiste ruffles of the shirt could be pulled out like a cock’s comb, while the lower part was cut diagonally to reveal the vest. The lapels of the enlisted men’s coats could be buttoned in either direction, often depending on which way the wind was blowing; as the waistline shifted downward over time, this helped to retain body heat. The front of the coat was cut diagonally to expose the chest and featured a three-inch-wide lapel extending to the waist, which matched the color of the trim and was lined with madder-red fabric. It was fastened with ten buttons, which were originally evenly spaced; later, however, some regiments introduced buttons and laces in pairs. The rank-and-file soldiers wore square, bastion- or flowerpot-shaped loops to decorate the front of the coat and reinforce the buttonholes.

Following the adoption of two epaulettes by the Foot Guards, most line regiments followed suit. The epaulettes were sewn onto the shoulder seam of the tunic, tapered toward the center, came to a point at the other end, and were fastened near the collar with a small regimental button. In 1784, epaulettes in the regimental color with a surrounding regimental braid were officially introduced, although many units had already adopted this practice long before that date. During the American War of Independence, this trend became standard practice and eventually the norm by 1793. The cuffs, in the regiment’s color, featured four buttons and four braided loops. Originally, they could be unbuttoned and rolled down in cold weather, with the loops then lying on the inside; however, before the end of the century, these were replaced by permanently attached cuffs.

Although worn during 1770s by 1786 the undress was officially introduced to enable generals and staff officers in the field to wear practical, plain dress. By 1798, a general’s undress or plain uniform coat was scarlet and featured long skirts that were hooked at the back and lined with white Kerseymere fabric. It had a scarlet stand-up collar as well as narrow blue cuffs and lapels; the lapels were three inches wide and designed so that they could be buttoned across the body down to the waist. The uniform buttons were spaced evenly along the lapels, sleeves, and coat tails, while there were no pocket flaps. There were four buttons on each sleeve and skirt, ten buttons on the lapels (including the front of the collar), and two buttons on the back between the hip buttons. The pockets were incorporated into the pleats or on the inside. Embroidery on the buttonholes was omitted; only the epaulets remained embroidered.

The undress uniform for a lieutenant general and a major general was similar to that of a general, with the exception that the buttons were arranged in rows of three and two, respectively. The dress uniform for the Adjutant General, the Quartermaster General, and the Barackmaster General were similar to that of a lieutenant general, but were trimmed with silver lace instead of gold. Their deputies were also issued an undress uniform with silver lace, similar to that of a major general. The undress uniforms of the aides-de-camp were cut similarly but featured no embroidery except for the epaulets. The same unembroidered, silver version was also mandatory for the deputy aides-de-camp and quartermasters, as well as for the brigade majors.

Uniforms after the royal warrant of 1768
Captains uniform in 1781 with red coat, red breeches and white turnback skirts

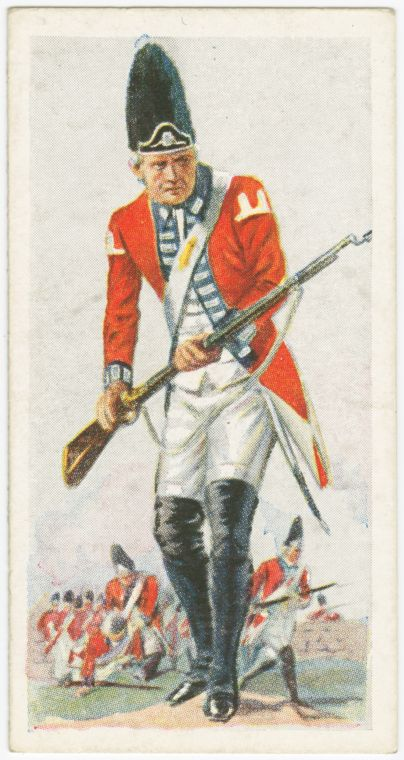
Royal Fusillier of the 7th Foot, with red coat blue cuffs and facings and white breeches

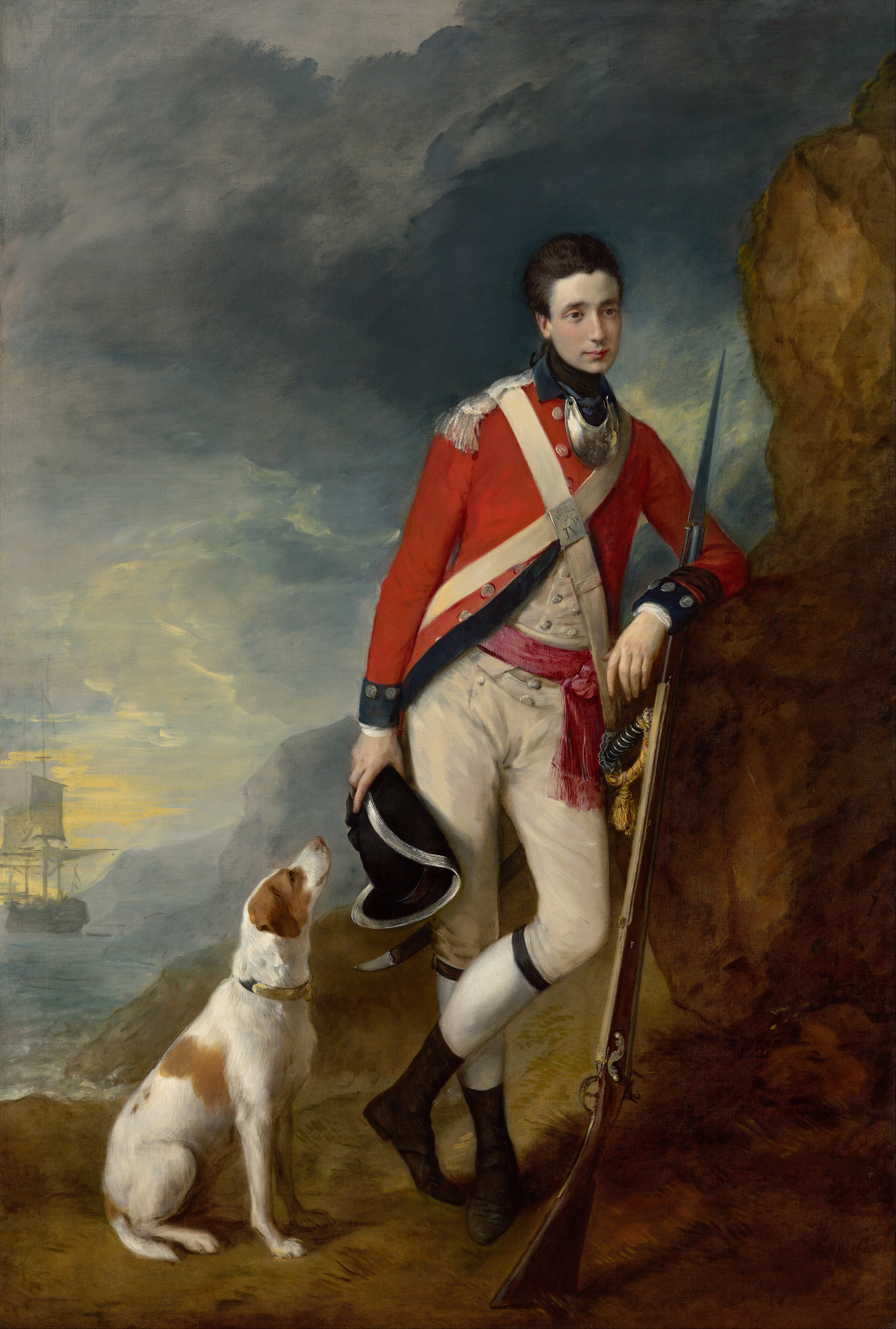
An officer of the 4th Regiment of Foot with red coat blue cuffs and blue facings

=== Highland Regiments ===
When in 1739 the first highland regiment (later Black Watch) was raised their coats and waistcoats were due to the voluminous folds of the belted plaid rather short. The jacket and waistcoat were red with buff cuffs; by 1758 the cuffs became blue. The different regiments then raised and disbanded over the course of the century distinguished themselves in the same way as the other regiments. For example the 78th or Frasier´s Highlanders had buff facings while the 76th Regiment of (Highland) foot featured green cuffs and facings.

=== Light Infantry ===
Introduced in North America during the Seven Years' War to meet the demands of the local terrain, the light infantry uniform was functional and adapted to the surrounding environment with its color. The soldiers wore clothing made of a coarse, black woolen fabric, trimmed with blue piping on the lapels. To ensure maximum freedom of movement in dense underbrush, the uniform consisted of a sleeveless tunic and a vest. With the exception of epaulettes in the style of grenadiers and drummers, all other decorations were removed. The breeches were made of linen and paired with thigh-high black gaiters that were buttoned at the calves.

With the official introduction of the Light Infantry in 1770, soldiers were issued the traditional red tunic, which was now worn as a one-piece, shorter jacket with a two-piece collar in the regiment’s color and a crimson lining. The tunic had coat lapels turned back and front coat skirts with the usual loops along the upper edge, which still featured pleats at the waist. A red vest was worn underneath. Military embellishments also returned; uniforms were adorned with white braids, loops, and lacing, and officers wore epaulet-like shoulder tabs. Toward the end of the 1770s, the collar became significantly wider at the nape and tapered toward the back, while vertical pockets with four bows on each side were added to the tunic. The hunting horn became established as the insignia of the light infantry, which wore it as an emblem on their uniforms.

=== Artillery ===
By 1743 the uniform dress of the officers was a plain blue coat, lined with scarlet, a large scarlet Argyle cuff, double breasted, and with yellow buttons to the bottom of the skirts and scarlet waistcoat, trimmed with broad gold lace. The sergeants' coats were trimmed, the lapels, cuffs, and pockets, with a broad single gold lace; the corporals and bombardiers with a narrow single gold lace. The gunners and NCO´s also wore plain blue coats with scarlet half-lappels, scarlet cuffs, and slashed sleeves with five buttons, but hat blue waistcoats instead. By 1764 the colour of the waistcoat became buff and in 1768 white. In 1770 the shoulder-knots were replaced with epaulettes.

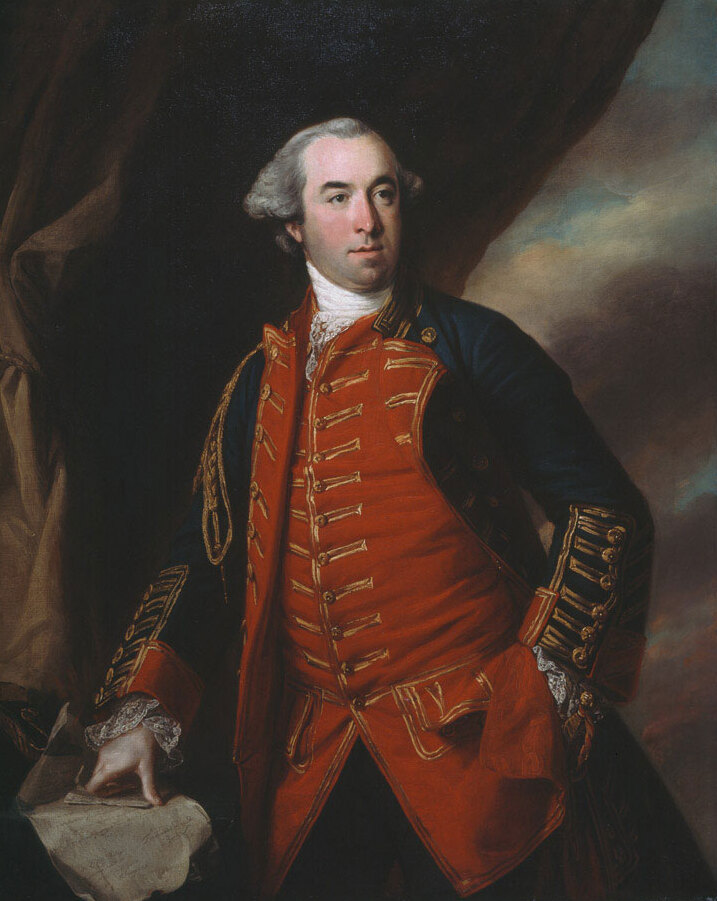
Lieutenant Colonel William Phillips in his blue artillery uniform

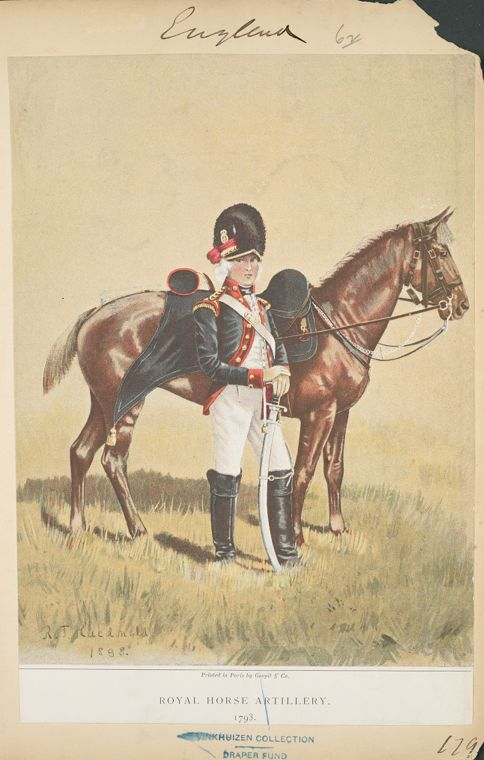
Officer of the Royal Horse Artillery in 1793

=== Royal Navy ===
By 1795 the full dress coat was still in blue but with blue instead of white facings. The stiff blue collar was edged all round with a gold lace in a parchment and chequered pattern. The turned-up lapels were also made of blue cloth and featured a gold lace of the same width as that on the collar. The nine buttonholes in total were edged with a lace in exactly the same pattern and the waistcoat were white. The round cuffs were also adorned with gold lace, with admirals wearing three rows of this as rank insignia around the cuff. Three vertical rows of lace were fastened at the top with a gold-plated button. Both the side slits and the pockets were edged with gold lace.

The pockets had three visible buttons directly beneath the pocket flap, which in turn was decorated with three blind, gold-edged buttonholes. The regulations of 1795 also formally introduced epaulettes. These had already been worn unofficially in previous years, even though Horatio Nelson had sharply criticised them twelve years earlier as a French fashion and a sign of dandyism. However, as foreign troops often failed to recognise British officers without epaulettes and refused to salute them, the Royal Navy eventually made them standard.

The epaulette consisted of a simple gold braid, from the end of which hung a fringe of twenty thick gold wires. Stars embroidered with silver sequins served to distinguish between ranks. Admirals wore epaulettes on both shoulders, each bearing three stars; vice-admirals had two stars; and rear-admirals had one star per epaulette. At the end closest to the neck, the epaulette was fastened with a gilded brass button. The buttons worn by flag officers featured a design that had remained unchanged since 1787: a faintly visible anchor within a circle of pearls, surrounded by a laurel wreath with a bow.

For admirals, the 1795 undress uniform consisted of a navy-blue coat similar to full-dress cut, with plain turn-back lapels, buttonholes and full-dress epaulettes. It had an open standing collar without lace to show the cravat. The three-pointed pocket flaps had three hidden gilt buttons. The sleeves had gold lace rings and three upper buttons. Captains in 1795 saw their white lapels and cuffs completely removed; their full-dress uniform featured a gold-laced blue standing collar and square-ended blue lapels with nine roped-edge, fouled-anchor buttons on each side, which were often buttoned over against bad weather. This full-dress uniform also included gold-laced skirts, slashed cuffs with gold lace and three buttons, white waistcoats and epaulettes according to seniority.

Senior captains wearing two plain-strapped epaulettes and those with under three years' post wearing only one. The 1795 captain's undress uniform were of navy-blue with an unadorned stand-and-fall collar and eight-button laceless lapels. It also had false round cuffs with three buttons and white waistcoat. The plain pockets had three buttons and epaulettes were optional. For lieutenants, the 1787 regulations ordered a coat identical to that of the captain but without gold lace, until the new regulations of 1795. The undress for lieutenants were navy-blue with a stand- up white collar, piped around the top. The coat had blue lapels piped in white on the leading edge and fastened by a row of nine gilt brass buttons of the same pattern used for full dress.

Although designed for the lapels to be buttoned back on both sides to display the waistcoat, the junior officers preferred to wear this coat buttoned across leaving the top two or three buttons undone, showing the white cravat. The round cuffs were piped in white and had three gilt buttons on each cuff. The pockets were piped in the same manner showing three gilt buttons also. There were gilt buttons at the waist. The regulations of 1787 provided warrant officers with an unadorned navy-blue coat featuring a fall-down collar, blue lapels with fouled-anchor buttons, and a white lining. Master's mates wore a similar blue coat with a fall-down collar and white lining that was edged but had no lapels. Midshipmen by 1787 wore single-breasted navy-blue coats distinguished by a historical white cloth patch on a standing collar with a rear brass button, alongside nine fouled-anchor buttons without a roped border and blue round cuffs holding three buttons.

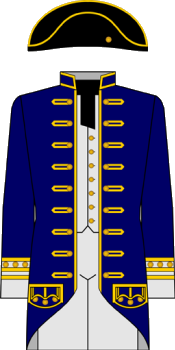
Admiral

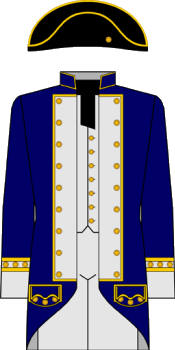
Captain over 3 years of seniority

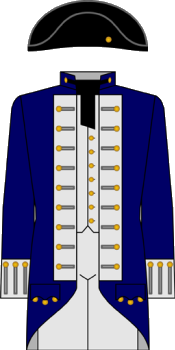
Lieutenant

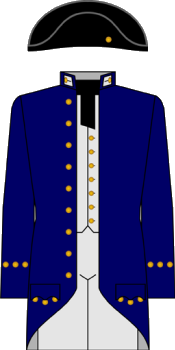
Midshipman

=== Cavalry ===
Apart from a few exceptions, such as the Royal Horse Guards and the Royal Regiment of Horse, who wore blue coats, the most common colour for the cavalry was red. The individual regiments were distinguished mainly by the colours of their facings, laces and cuffs. In addition to the buff waistcoats worn by the Household Cavalry, the waistcoats of the heavy and light cavalry were green, blue and orange.

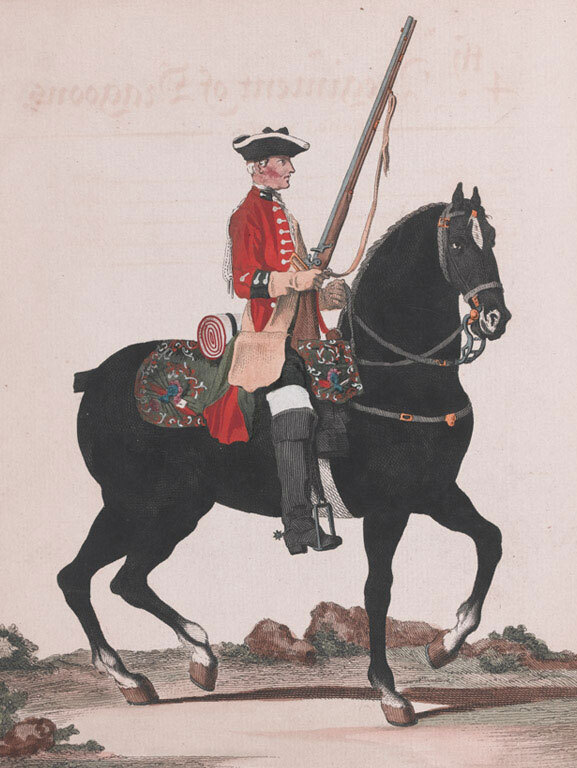
Trooper of the 4th Regiment of Dragoons around 1742

From 1768 onwards, the colours of the tunics were the same as those of the infantry; men wore madder red, whilst non-commissioned officers and officers wore scarlet. The regiment’s distinctive colour was visible on the collar, lapels and cuffs. The turned-down collar was usually worn fastened up to the top button of the lapel whilst on duty. From then on, the sleeves were no longer slit, and their buttons were positioned so that they ran up the arm, even if the buttonhole bands were arranged in pairs or groups of three.

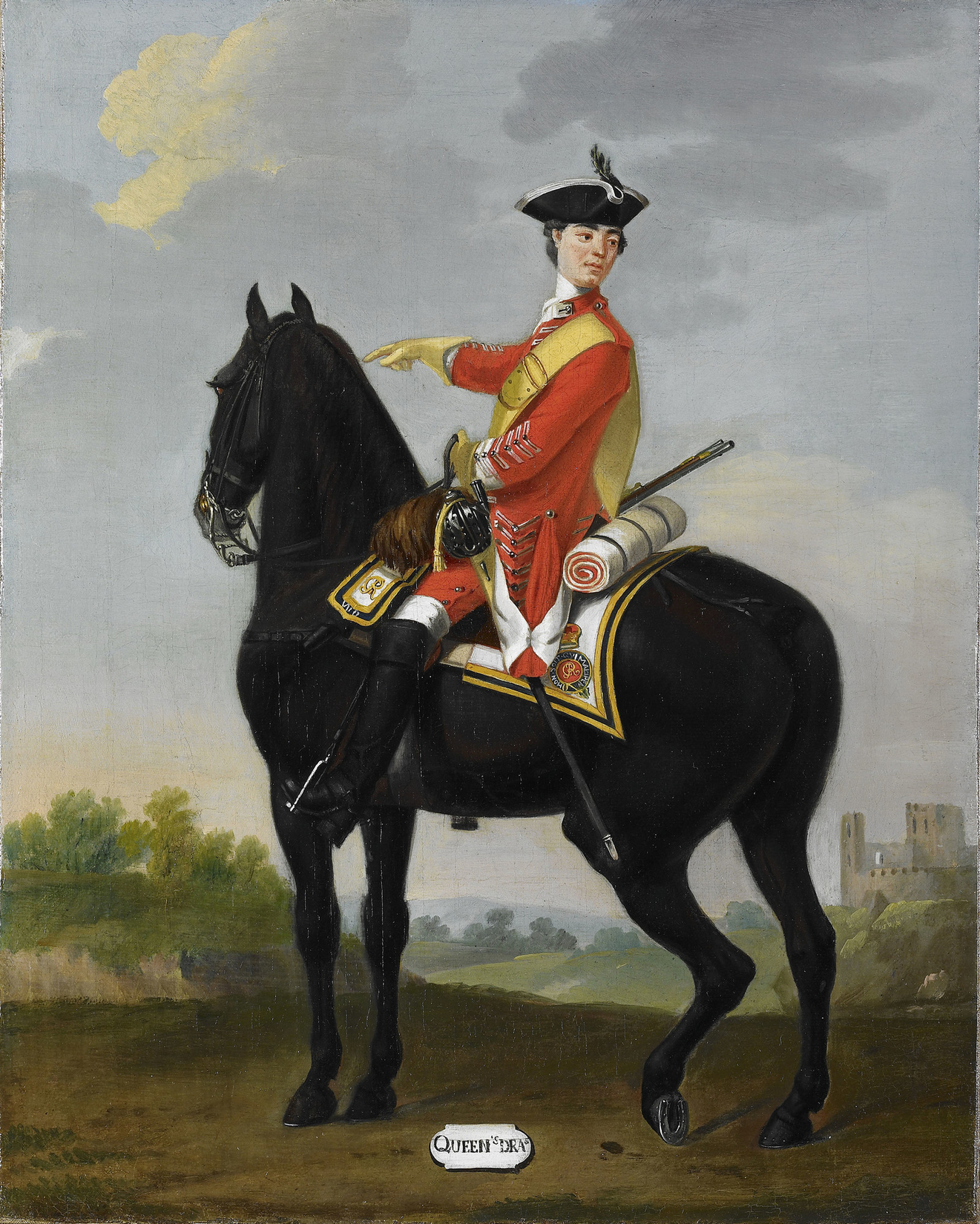
Trooper of the 7th Queen's Dragoons around 1751

Within the various cavalry units, there were specific differences in the cut of the uniform. Among the Dragoon Guards, the Regiments of Horse and the Light Dragoons, the lapels initially reached down to the waist, but by the time of the American War of Independence they had moved down to the hips. The regular Dragoons, on the other hand, wore their coats entirely without lapels, but retained the vertical pockets, as did the other units. In most regiments, the cuffs were curved or notched. Exceptions were the Light Dragoons, who retained the square cuff and, after 1768, wore only three angular braids over it, and the 2nd Royal North British Dragoons, who had a square, cut-out cuff.

Although the long officers’ coats were less loose-fitting than they had been before the middle of the century, they still contained plenty of fabric and were often worn without lapels at first. As officers tended to interpret the regulations rather freely, many did not adhere strictly to the current rules, embellishing the lapels of their coats to their own taste and usually using angular loops, although the respective regimental colonel decided on these details. Their coats were also richly embroidered with gold or silver, whilst the rank and file imitated these colours using simpler means. Towards the end of the 1770s, a shorter style of jacket finally became the norm amongst officers, characterised by distinctive pleating at the back.

== Headwear ==
The standard hats for all branches except for the grenadiers and fusiliers was the tricorne hat with a black cockade and white trim, for man silver lace for NCO and gilt lace for officers. There could additional insignia used to distinguish friend from foe during battle. In order to mark them as elite units and also to prevent their hats to fall from the head while throwing granates grenadiers and fusiliers wore mitre shaped caps. When the tradition of regimental or family coats of arms was abandoned after 1749, the front was embroidered with the royal cypher (Georges Rex), above which a crown and other plant motifs were placed. At the bottom of the front there was a small red flap with the white horse of Hanover underneath, mounted over a ground of green and yellow. It was bordered with the motto Nec Aspera Terrent (difficulties taunt us not) written on it.

Instead of the tricorne hat Highland Regiments wore a blue bonnet or flat cap. It often featured a small piece of white tape with a red stripe and a black cockade on the left side. Over time, the bonnet developed a checkerboard pattern about three inches wide in red, white, and green along the brim. At the same time, feathers became increasingly elaborate, eventually covering the bonnet almost entirely by the turn of the century. This trim consisted of trimmed rooster feathers attached to a stem and secured with a black cockade featuring a regimental button.

The color and length of these so-called hackles served as a means of distinction: While the grenadiers wore pure white feathers and the light companies, established in 1770, were recognizable by their green adornments, the regular battalions used a two-color variant in white and red. The height usually varied between 8.5 and 12 inches. Attaching ostrich feathers was also very popular, with styles ranging from subtle single feathers to feather crowns. Another distinguishing feature was the wool pom-pom on the crown, whose colors, white for grenadiers, green for the light infantry, and red for the rest of the battalion indicated unit affiliation. For full dress uniform, however, the grenadiers of the Highland regiments usually opted for the fur cap.

A piece of red fabric was sewn to the stiffened front of the cap from the back, and two small canes were used to give it its shape; colored cloth was attached to the sides and back to cover the stitching. On the back, near the bottom, there was a small flap made of trim fabric, on which the regiment’s number, a burning grenade, and often other leaf motifs were embroidered. The cap was lined with unbleached linen and decorated along the lower edge with a strip of regimental lace. Officers’ caps were usually decorated with silver or gold laces and were generally much more elaborate in appearance.

From the early 1760s onward, the mitre caps were gradually replaced by bearskin caps and they became official attire in 1768.From 1760s, onwards the front corner of the tricorne became increasingly flatter, developing into the bicorne in the 1790s. Since the Light Infantry was designed for skirmishing, the tricorne was unsuitable. As early as the 1770s, they were issued lighter, close-fitting leather caps, often with a small visor and a wool or fur crest for decoration.By the end of the century the most common headdress for the light infantry was the tarleton.

Headdress
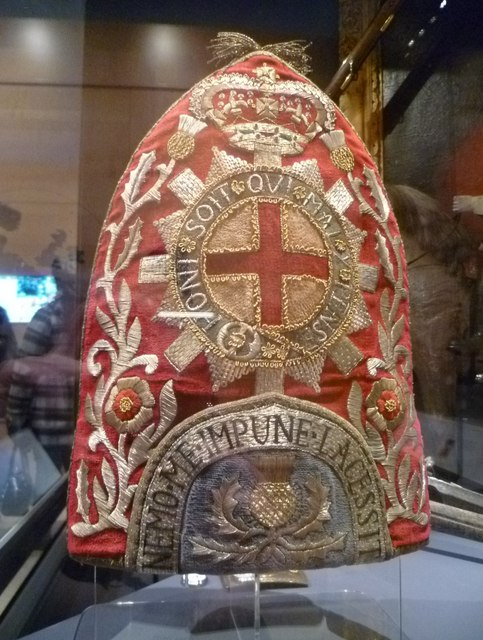
A Grenadiers mitre cap around 1707

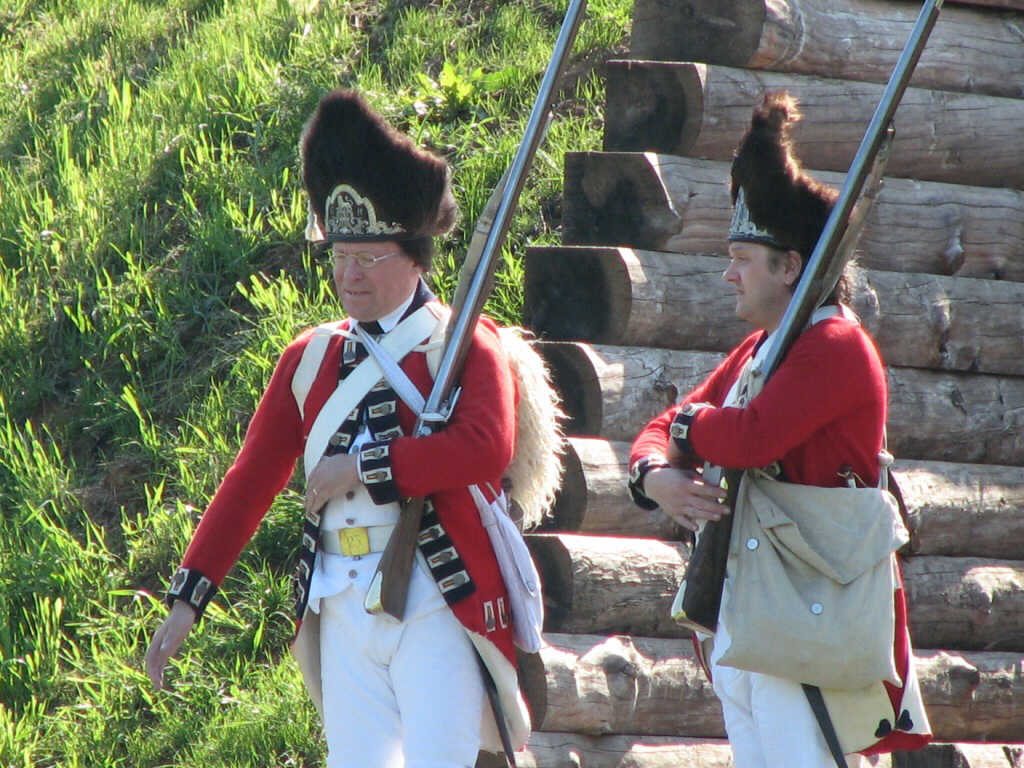
reenactors of the Royal Welch Fusiliers wearing fur caps

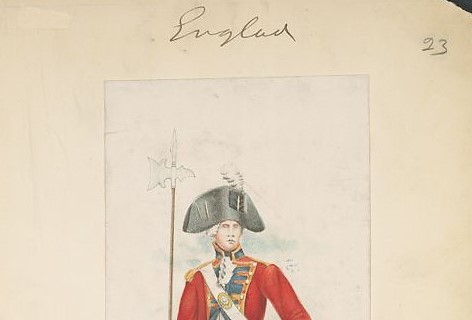
A Sergeant in 1790 wearing an early bicorne

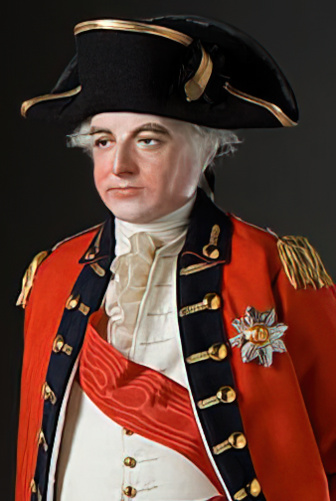
historical figure of Sir Henry Clinton wearing a tricorne with golden lace

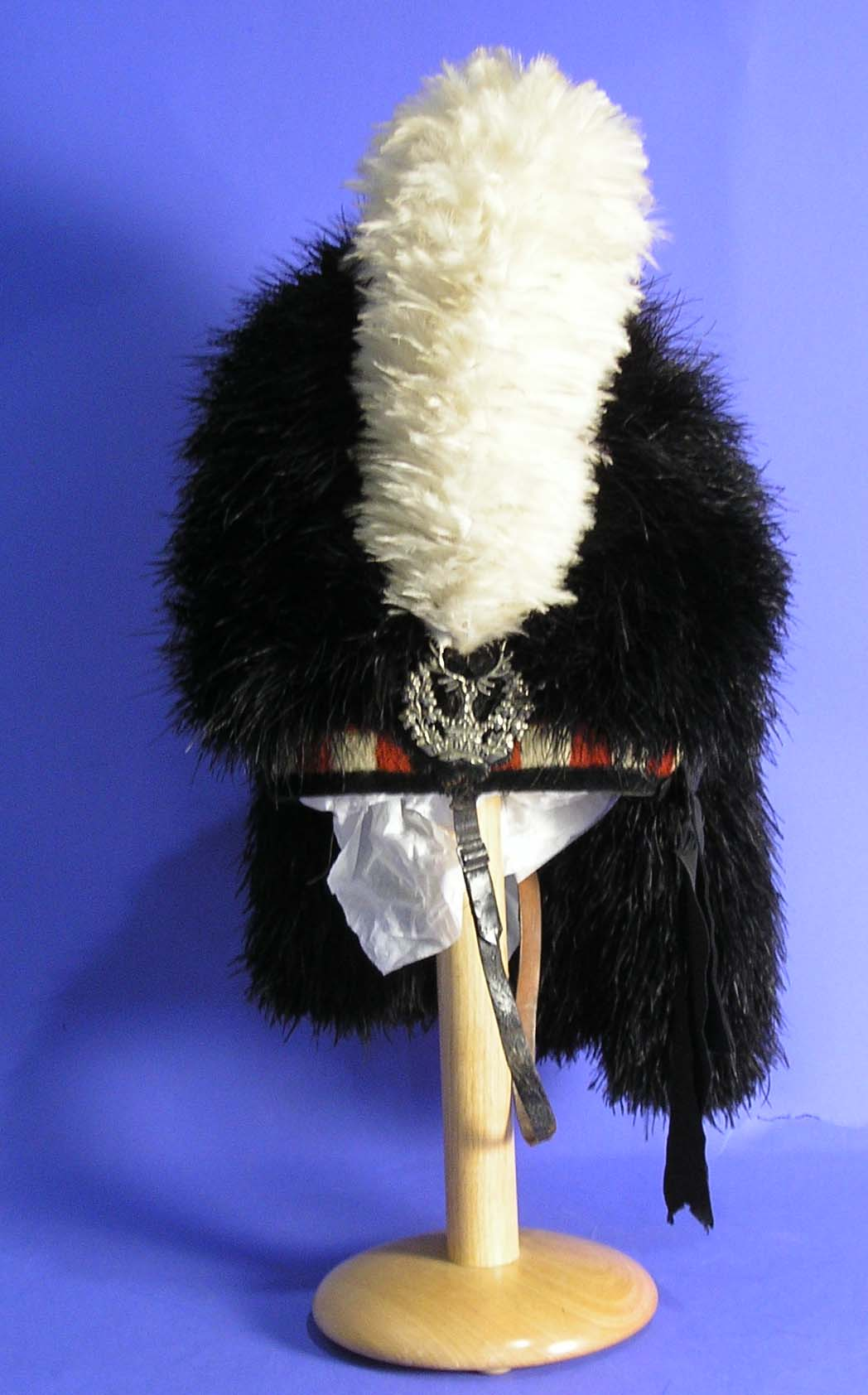
A Highland bonnet almost obscured by feathers

== Footwear ==
In 1751, cavalry footwear consisted of black-dyed leather boots with a square toe, high heels, and an instep that usually remained brown. Since the boots of that era were cut straight without a left-right distinction, they were actually supposed to be worn alternately on the other foot each day; however, soldiers usually avoided doing so in their daily lives. Officers avoided this problem by having boots custom-made by private shoemakers. By 1768, the shape of the boots had changed to a rounder toe, and the boots had become lighter. Regular shoes were fastened with straps and buckles, which could be very elaborately designed for both officers and ordinary soldiers on festive occasions. In addition, ankle-high half-boots were used in everyday service, while fashion-conscious officers preferred flat shoes with thin soles for social occasions. The infantry shoes were of black dyed leather with round toes, leather heels and soles. The shoes were held on the feet by a strap stitched to each upper and buckled together.

== Legwear ==
Before 1768, there were many different colours in use across the various regiments. For example in 1742 the royal regiments wore blue breeches while infantry and artillery wore red breeches. There were also a wide range of colours in the cavalry including blue, yellow, red and buff. From 1768 white breeches were introduced for the entire infantry and artillery. There were exceptions for those units that had buff facings – in this case, buff was the colour of their breeches. From 1768, the Guard regiments also adopted white breeches: the 3rd Guards in 1768, the 1st Foot Guards in 1771 and the Coldstream Guards in 1773. The same applied to the light and heavy cavalry, who from 1768 wore white breeches, or buff breeches for those units with buff facings. From 1767, black linen gaiters were also required for the infantry, and from 1784, woollen gaiters, which replaced the white ones and reached just below the knee.When first raised the Highland regiments wore the belted plaid (Breacan an fheilidh or feileadh mór).During the French and Indian war the plaid was gradually replaced by the kilt, that often were made from older worn-out plaids.

== Bibliography ==
- Carman, W.Y. (1940). "Infantry Clothing Regulations 1802". Journal of the Society for Army Historical Research. 19 (76). JSTOR 44220911.
- Carman, W.Y. (1968). British Military Uniforms: From Contemporary Pictures, Henry VII to present Day. Feltham: Hamlyn Publishing Group.
- Fabb, John (1977). The uniforms of Trafalgar. London: B.T. Batsford.
- Holmes, Richard (2002). Redcoat : the British Soldier in the Age of horse and Musket. London: HarperCollins. ISBN 0-00-653152-0.
- Franklin, Carl E. (2012). British Army uniforms from 1751 to 1783. Barnsley: Pen & Sword. ISBN 1-84884-690-8.
- McCulloch, Ian (2006). The Highland Regiments in the French and Indian War, 1756-1767. Sons of the Mountains. Vol. II. Fleischmanns, New York: Purple Mountain Press. ISBN 1-930098-75-8.
- May, Robin (1974). The British Army in North America 1775-1783. Reading: Osprey.
- Barthorp, Michael (1982). British infantry uniforms since 1660. New York: Blandford Press.
- Kane, John; Askwith, William Harrison (1900). List of Officers of the Royal Regiment of Artillery from the Year 1716 to the Year 1899. London: William Clowes and Sons.
- Mollo, John (1975). Uniforms of the American Revolution in color. New York: Macmillan.
- Bleckwenn, Hans; et al. (Battledress : the Uniforms of the World's Great Armies, 1700 to the Present) (1978). Schick, I.T. (ed.). European Wars of Eighteenth-Century Absolutism 1700 - 1763. Boston: Little Brown.
- Knötel, Herbert (1980). Uniforms of the World : a Compendium of Army, Navy and Airforce Uniforms : 1700-1937. London: Arms and Armour.
- Damhorst, Mary Lynn; Miller, Kimberly A.; Michelman, Susan O. (1999). The Meanings of Dress. Fairchild Books. ISBN 1-56367-165-4.
