= Kerseymere =

Smooth-faced twill fabric with a worsted warp and woolen weft

- Type: Fabric
- Material: Wool
- Production method: Weaving
- Production process: Craft Production
- Place of origin: Kersey, Suffolk

Kerseymere is a fine woolen cloth with a twill weave.

== History ==
Originating in Kersey, Suffolk, kerseymere derives its name from the village and the factory it was first manufactured in, which was located along a mere.

== Uses ==
In printing fine work during the mid-19th century, the blankets that lay between the tympans were either fine kerseymere or superfine woolen cloth.

As a finer, stronger weave of kersey, it was popular during the early to mid-19th century for day wear. Women wore pelisse and spencers made of kerseymere, with colors ranging from subtle neutral tones to vivid hues. While kerseymere was a popular fabric choice for women's outer wear, it was used more liberally in men's attire. Waistcoasts and trousers made of kerseymere were typically plain with neutral tones. However, pastel colors such as pale lavender were also used for bottom wear.

== See also ==
- Kersey (cloth)
- Twill
- Wool
- Woolen
- Textile
- Cloth
- Pelisse
- Spencer (clothing)
