= Spencer (clothing) =

Very short jacket, popular around 1800

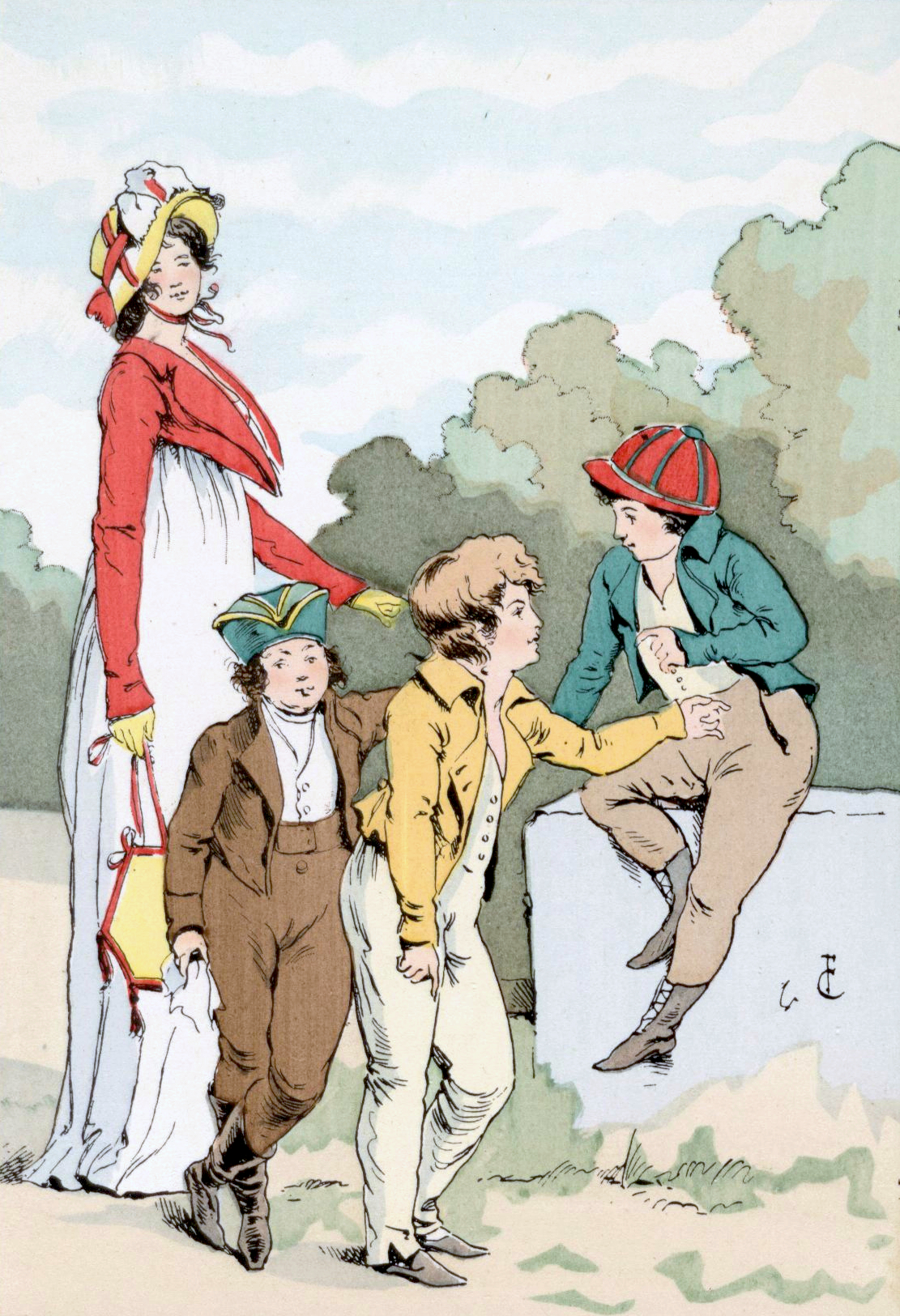
Clothing, c. 1800. The woman and the boy in brown are wearing spencers

The spencer, dating from the 1790s, was originally a woollen outer tail-coat with the tails omitted. It was worn as a short waist-length, double-breasted, man's jacket. It was originally named after George Spencer, 2nd Earl Spencer (1758–1834), who is reported to have had a tail-coat adapted after its tails were burned by coals from a fire. It was adopted as mess dress by British military officers, leading to the name mess jacket.

It was also soon adopted as a popular women's fashion on both sides of the Atlantic during the 1790–1820 Regency style period The spencer was worn as a cardigan, or as a short, fitted jacket cut to just above waist level, or, in Empire style, to the bust line, and tailored on identical lines to the dress.

The use of the term spencer continued well into the 19th century to mean more generally any type of short jacket or coat. In Australia, New Zealand and South Africa the term is sometimes used to refer to thermal underwear.

In current menswear, the term "spencer" is often synonymous with a slipover also referred to as a knitted vest.

== Gallery ==
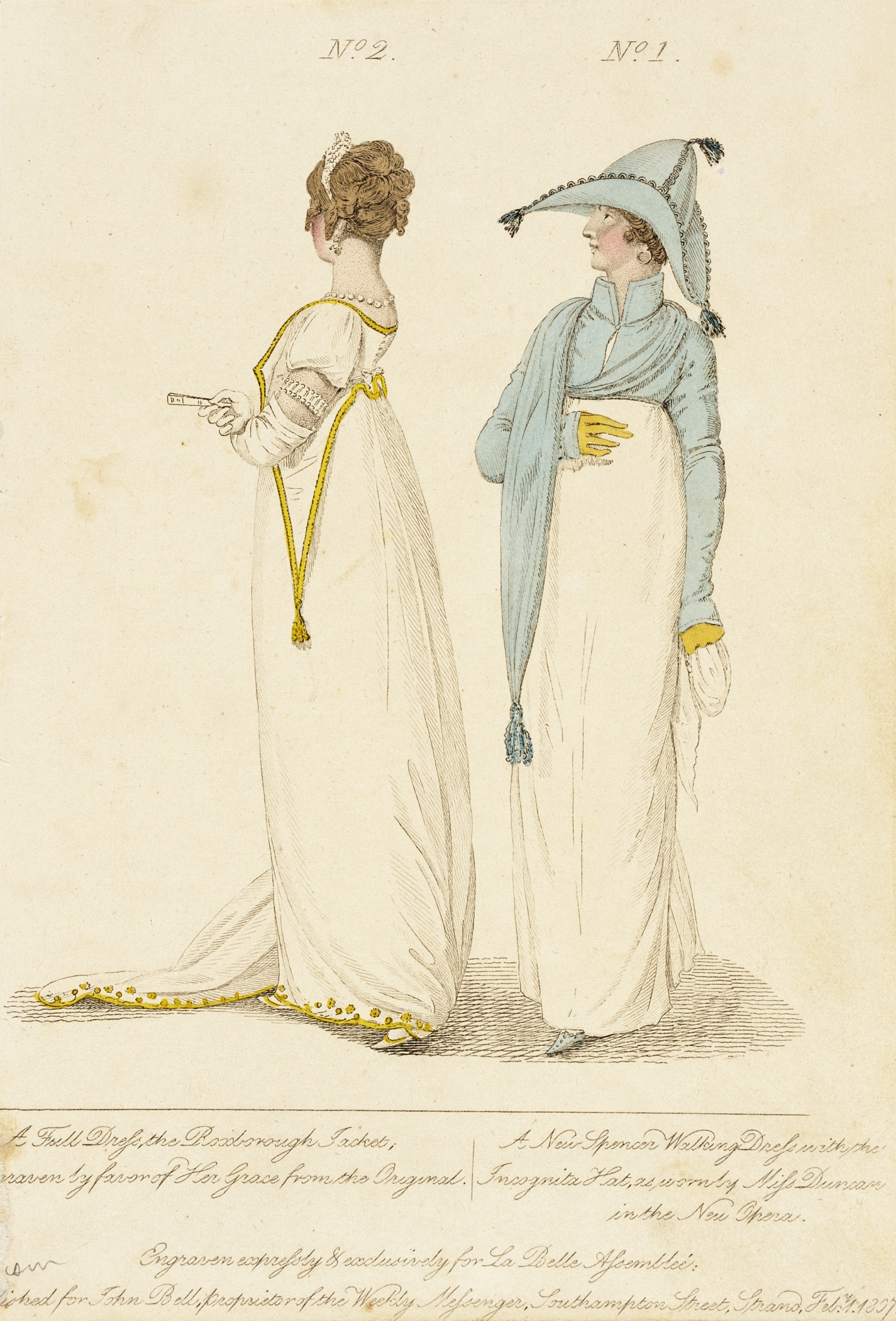
"A New Spencer Walking Dress with the Incognita Hat" from the January 1807 La Belle Assemblée

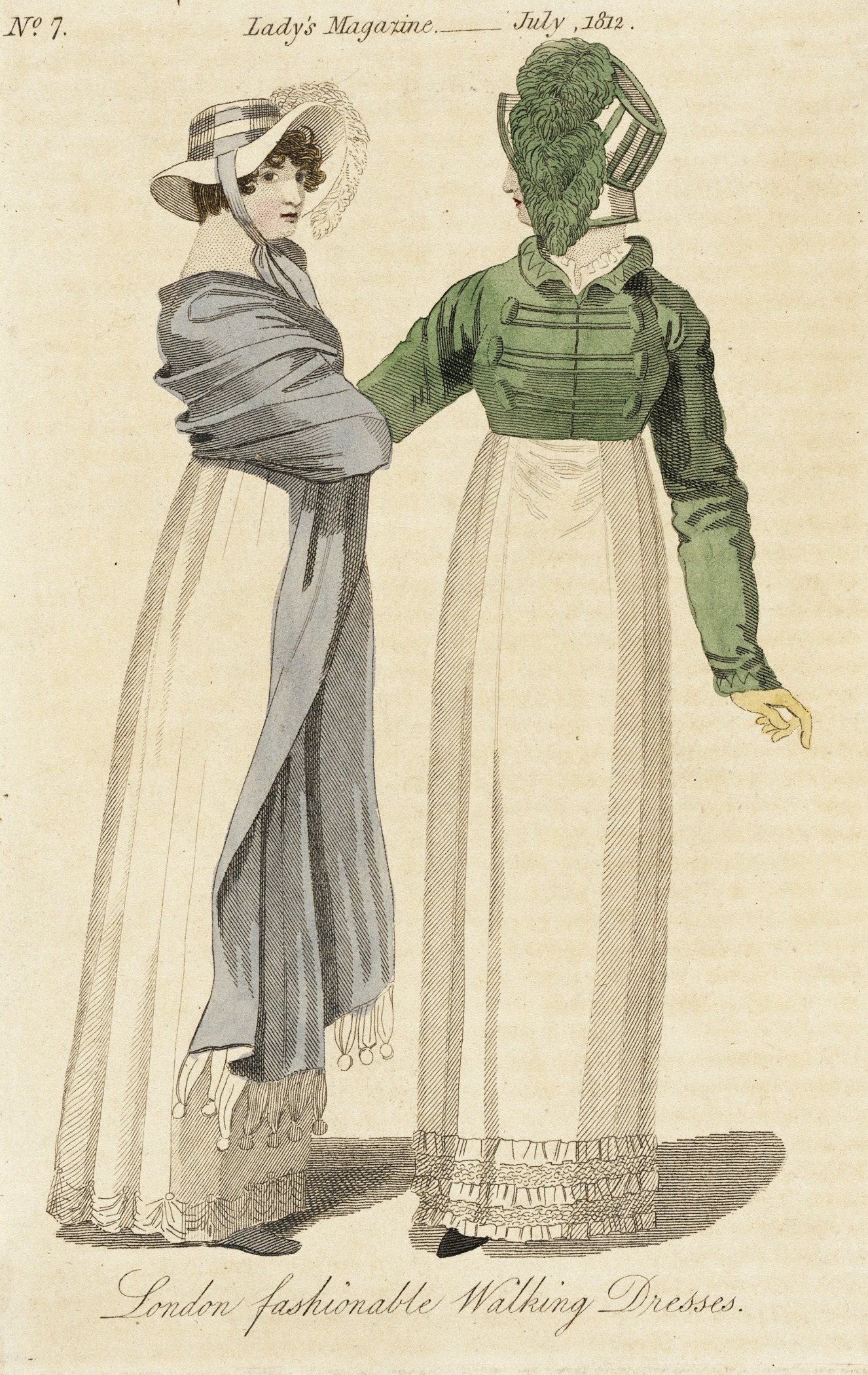
"London Fashionable Walking Dresses" from the July 1812 Lady's Magazine

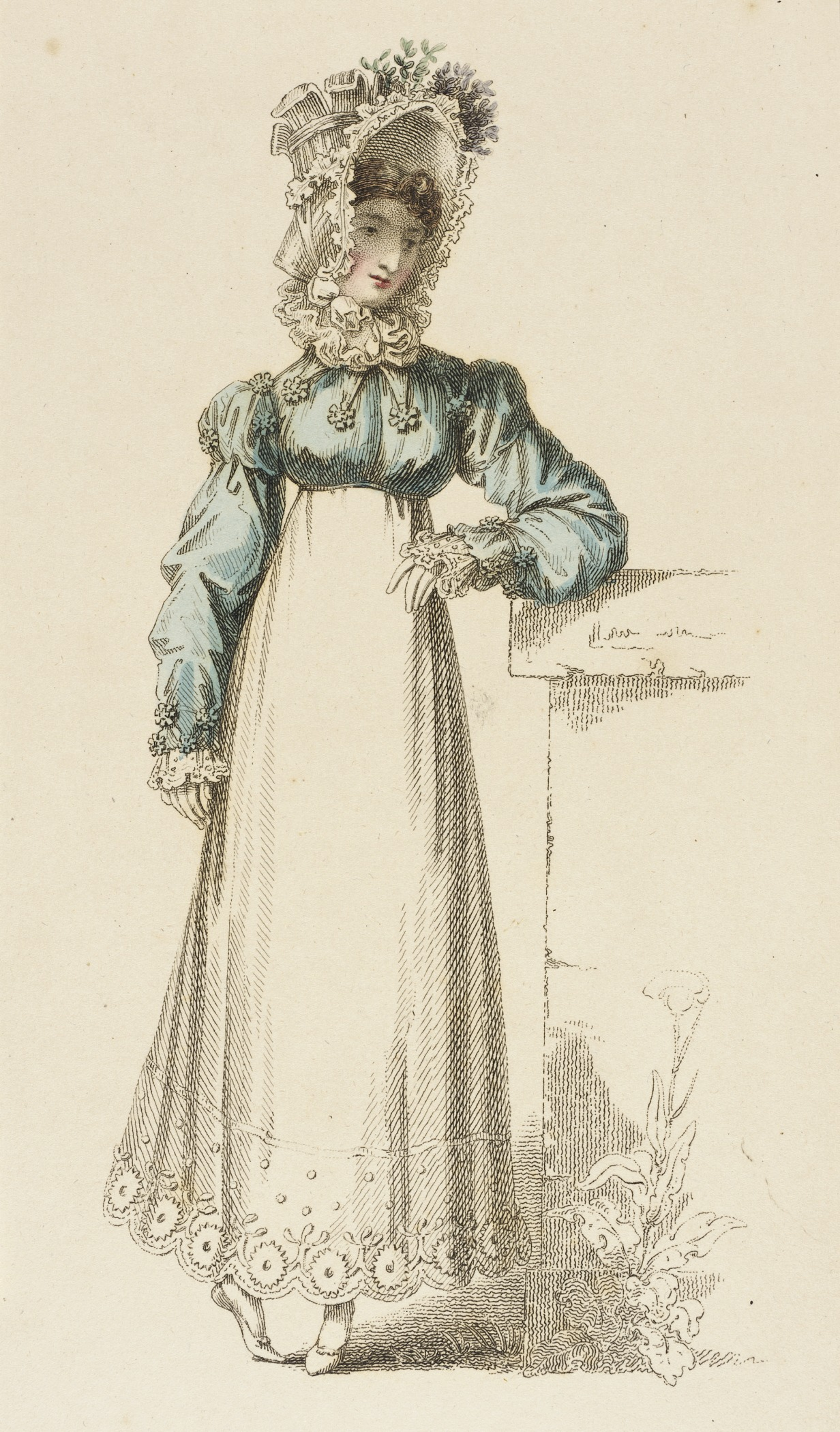
"Promenade Dress" from the October 1817 Ackermann's Repository of Arts

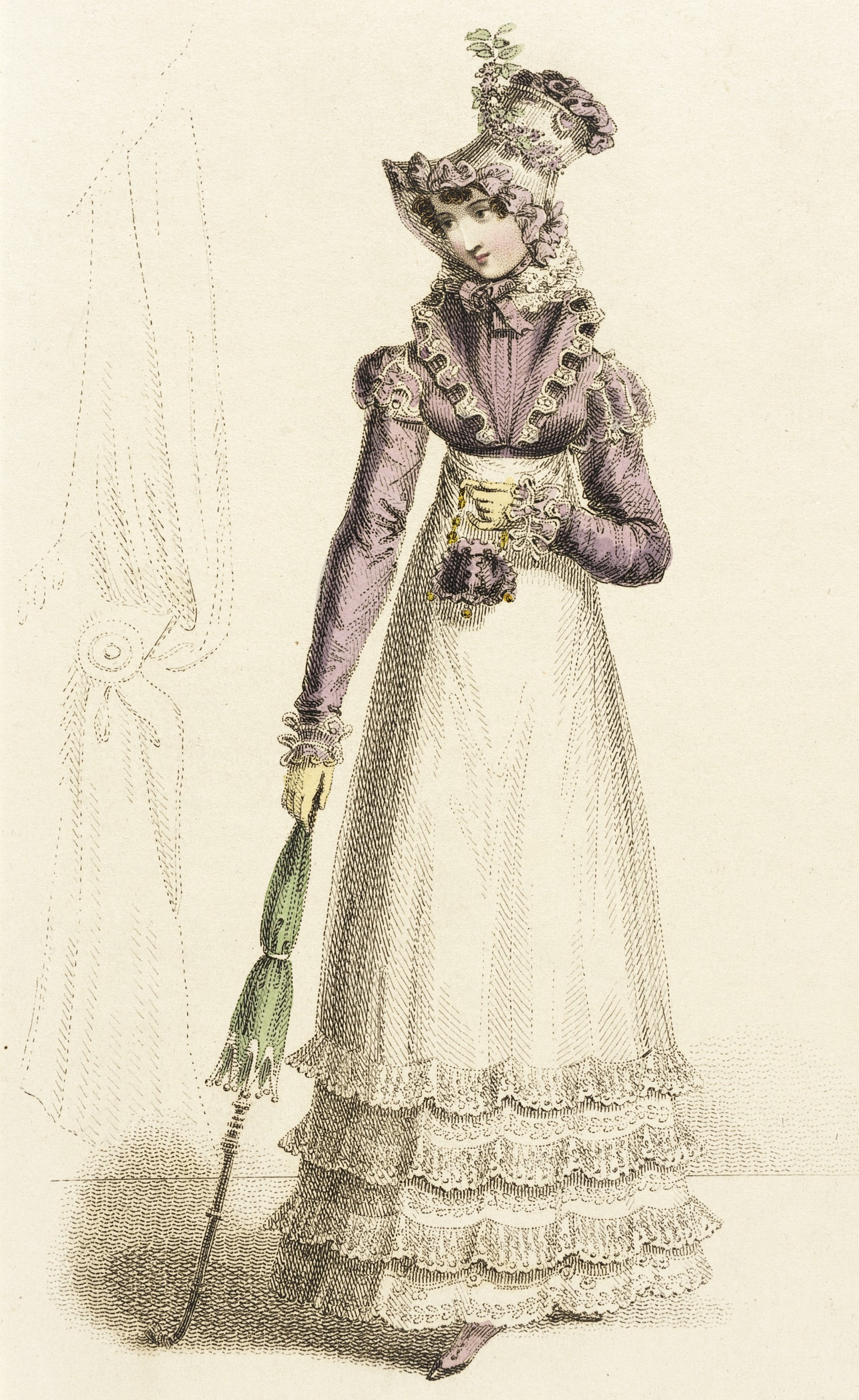
"Walking Dress" from the April 1820 La Belle Assemblée
