= 1500–1550 in European fashion =

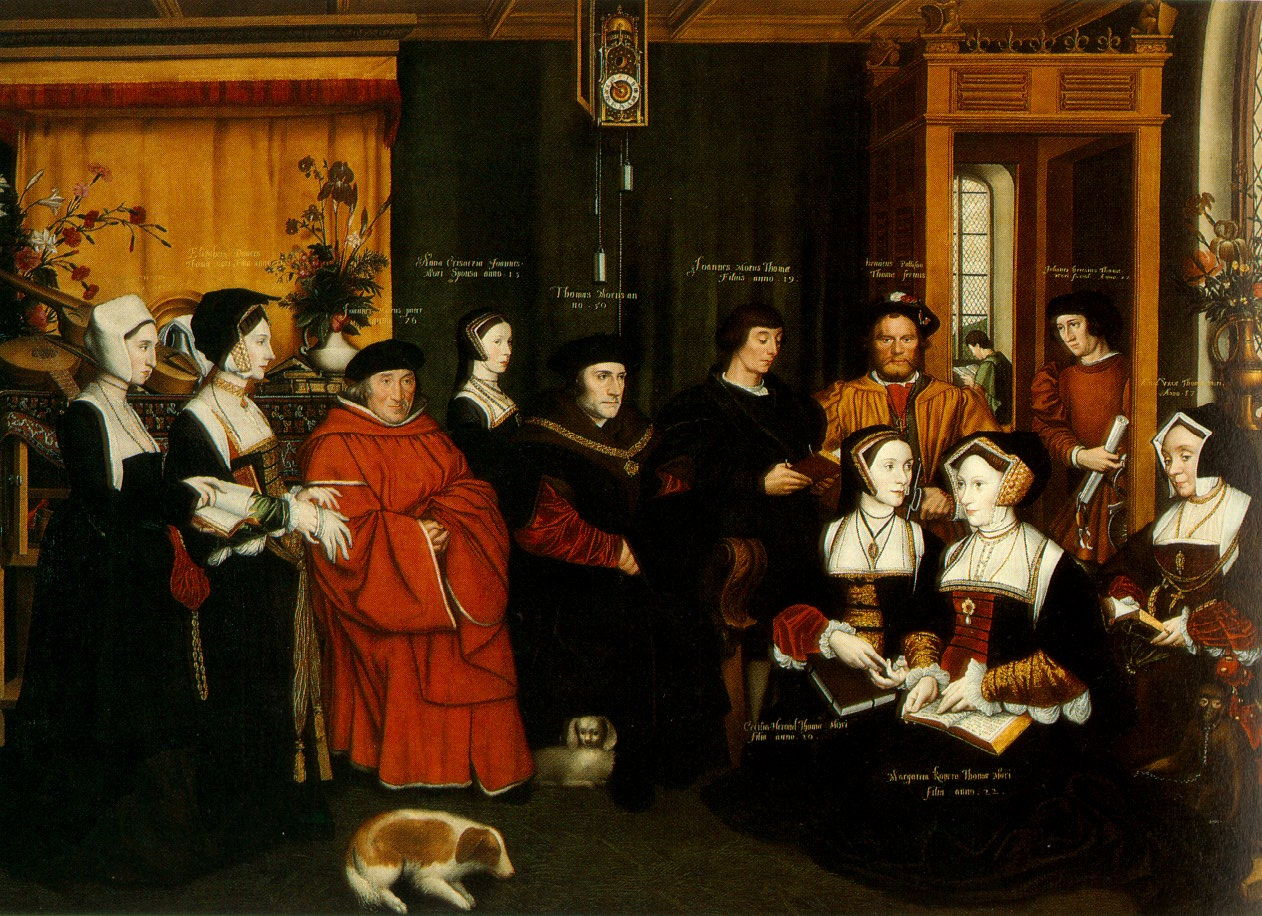
Portrait of the family of Sir Thomas More shows English fashions around 1528.

Fashion in the period 1500–1550 in Europe is marked by very thick, big and voluminous clothing worn in an abundance of layers (one reaction to the cooling temperatures of the Little Ice Age, especially in Northern Europe and the British Isles). Contrasting fabrics, slashes, embroidery, applied trims, and other forms of surface ornamentation became prominent. The tall, narrow lines of the Late Middle Ages were replaced with a wide silhouette, conical for women with breadth at the hips and broadly square for men with width at the shoulders. Sleeves were a center of attention, and were puffed, slashed, cuffed, and turned back to reveal contrasting linings.

Henry VIII of England (ruled 1509–1547) and Francis I of France (ruled 1515–1547) strove to host the most glittering Renaissance court, culminating in the festivities around the Field of Cloth of Gold (1520). But the rising power was Charles V, king of Spain, Naples, and Sicily from 1516, heir to the style as well as the riches of Burgundy, and Holy Roman Emperor from 1520. The inflow of gold and silver from the New World into recently united Spain changed the dynamics of trade throughout Western Europe, ushering in a period of increased opulence in clothing that was tempered by the Spanish taste for sombre richness of dress that would dominate the second half of the century. This widespread adoption of Hispanic court attire in Europe was seen as a sign of allegiance to the empire of Charles V.

Regional variations in fashionable clothing that arose in the 15th century became more pronounced in the sixteenth. In particular, the clothing of the Low Countries, German states, and Scandinavia developed in a different direction than that of England, France, and Italy, although all acknowledged the sobering and formal influence of Spanish dress after the mid-1520s.

Linen shirts and chemises or smocks had full sleeves and often full bodies, pleated or gathered closely at neck and wrist. The resulting small frill gradually became a wide ruffle, presaging the ruff of the latter half of the century. These garments were often decorated with embroidery in black or red silk, and occasionally with gold metal threads if the garment was meant to be flashier of ones wealth. The bodice was boned and stiffened to create a more structured form, and often a busk was inserted to emphasise the flattening and elongation of the torso. Small geometric patterns appeared early in the period and, in England, evolved into the elaborate patterns associated with the flowering of blackwork embroidery. German shirts and chemises were decorated with wide bands of gold trim at the neckline, which was uniformly low early in the period and grew higher by midcentury. Silk brocades and velvets in bold floral patterns based on pomegranate and thistle or artichoke motifs remained fashionable for those who could afford them, although they were often restricted to kirtles, undersleeves and doublets revealed beneath gowns of solid-coloured fabrics or monochromatic figured silks. Yellow and red were fashionable colours.

Inspired by the mended uniforms of the Swiss soldiers after the country's 1477 victory over the Duke of Burgundy, elaborate slashing remained popular, especially in Germany, where a fashion arose for assembling garments in alternating bands of contrasting fabrics. Elsewhere, slashing was more restrained, but bands of contrasting fabric called guards, whether in colour or texture, were common as trim on skirts, sleeves, and necklines. These were often decorated with bands of embroidery or applied passementerie. Bobbin lace arose from passementerie in this period, probably in Flanders, and was used both as an edging and as applied trim; it is called passamayne in English inventories.

The most fashionable furs were the silvery winter coat of the lynx and dark brown (almost black) sable.

== Women's fashion ==
=== Overview ===
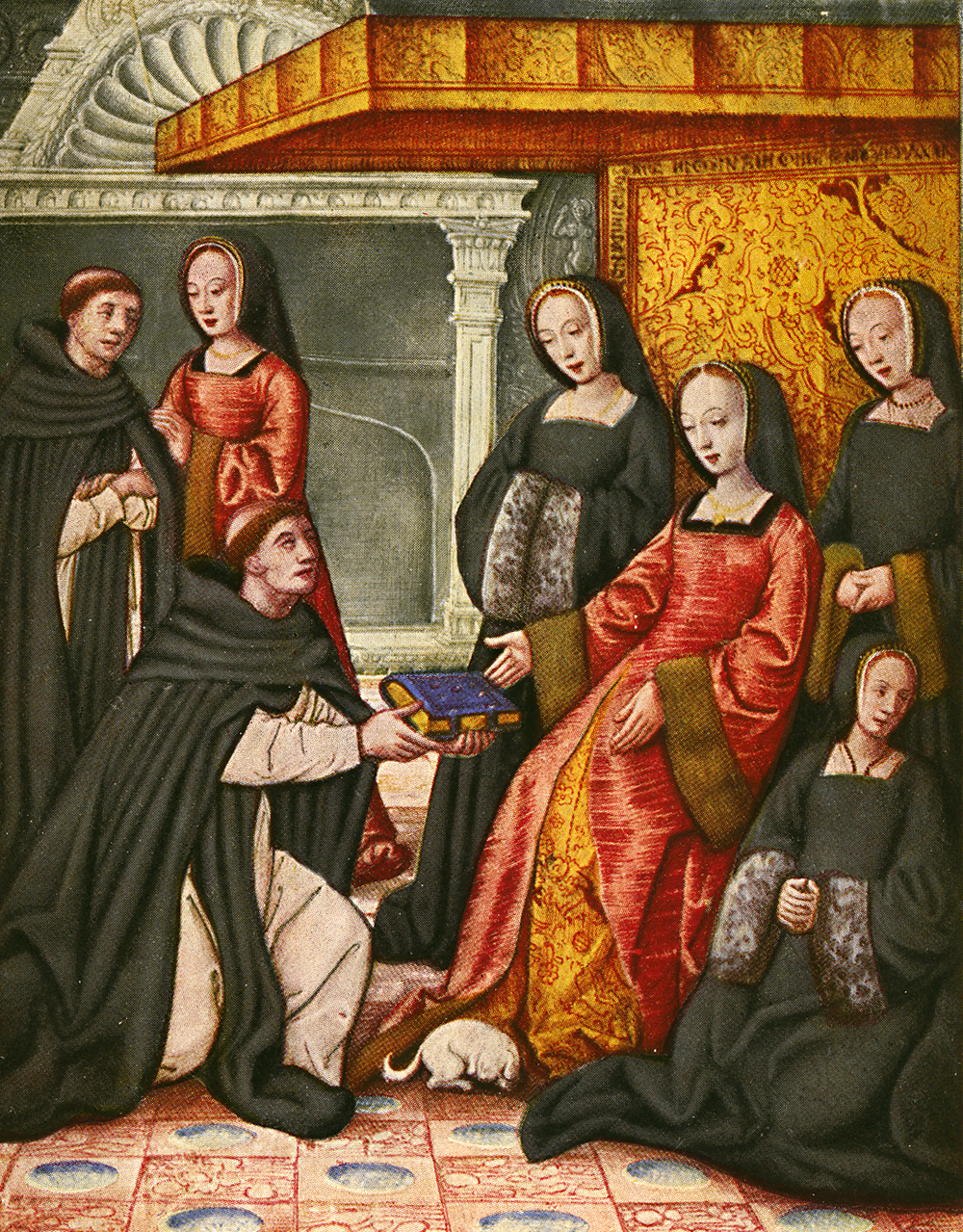
Anne of Brittany, Queen of France, and her ladies wear round hoods over linen caps. Anne's gown is open at the front to reveal a figured silk kirtle beneath. The gowns have wide sleeves with turned-back cuffs lined in fur, 1508.

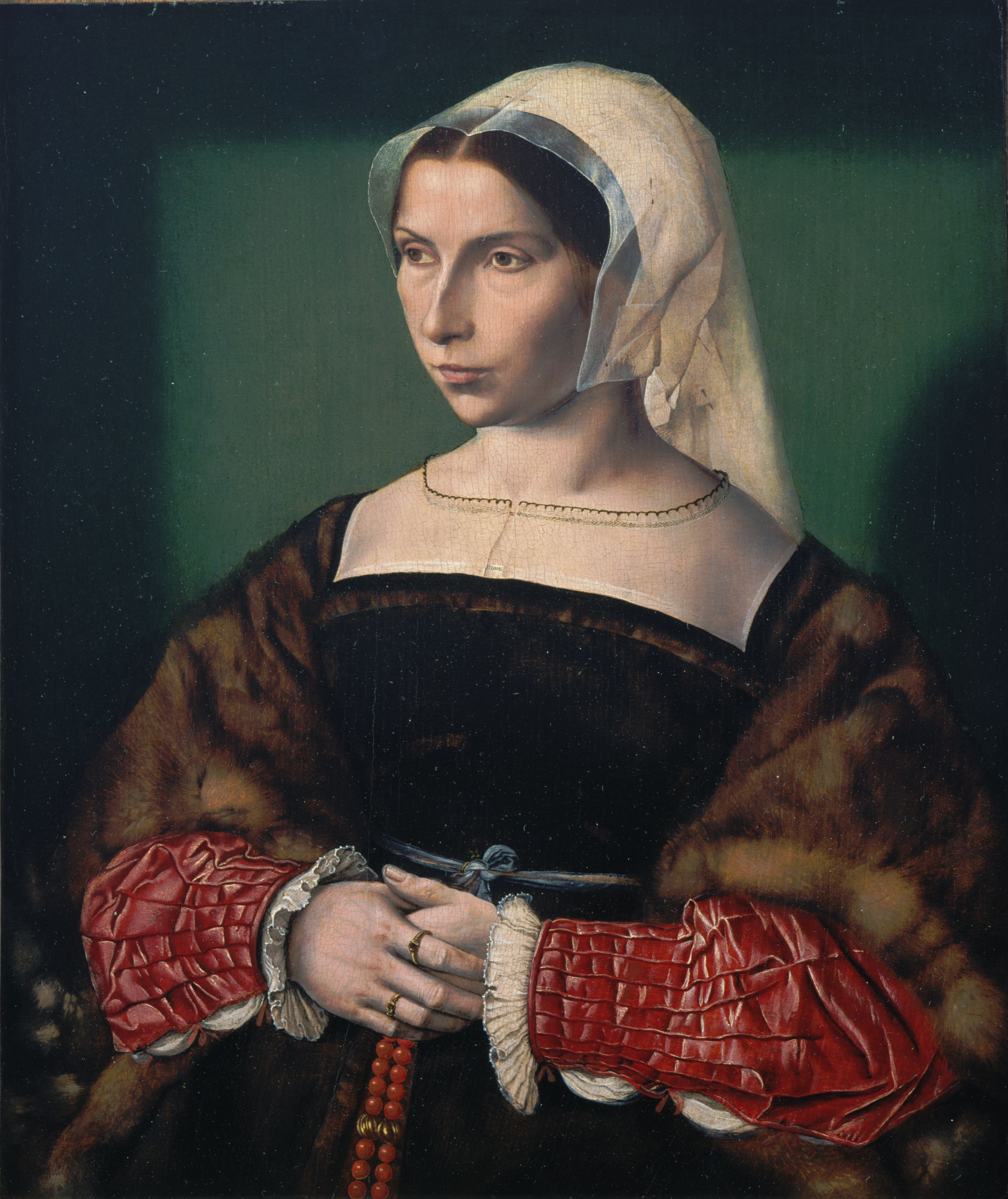
Anne Stafford wears a black fur-lined gown with turned-back sleeves over a dark kirtle She wears a soft sash at her waist and a sheer partlet over a square-necked chemise, c. 1535.

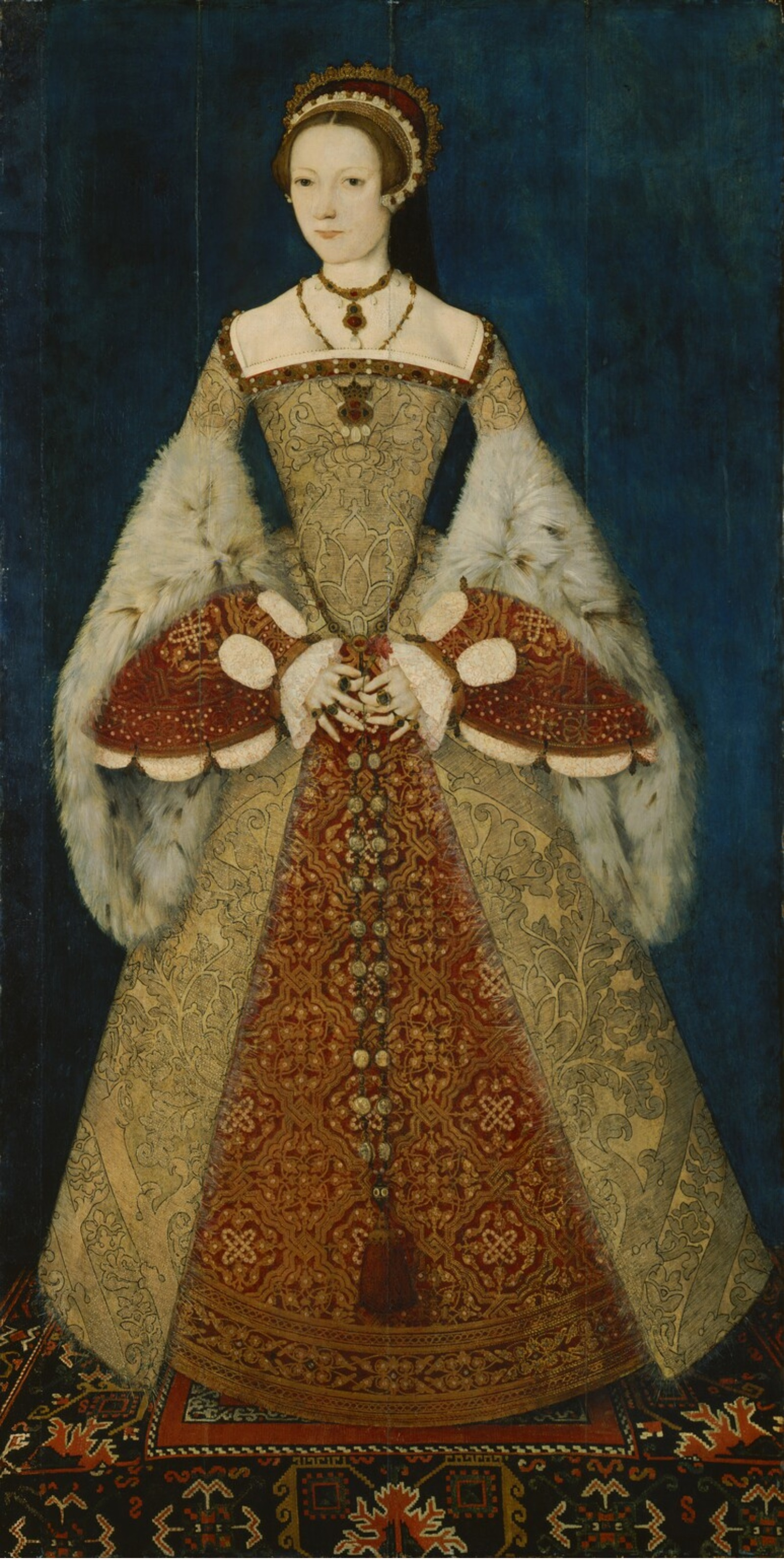
Portrait of Catherine Parr, sixth queen of Henry VIII. English or French fashion of 1545: the trumpet-sleeved "French" or "Tudor dress", worn over a farthingale and false undersleeves with a matching forepart. The turned-back cuffs are lined with fur.

Women's fashions of the early 16th century consisted of a long gown, usually with sleeves, worn over a kirtle or undergown, with a linen chemise or smock worn next to the skin.

The high-waisted gown of the late medieval period evolved in several directions in different parts of Europe. In the German states and Bohemia, gowns remained short-waisted, tight-laced but without corsets or stays. The open-fronted gown laced over the kirtle or a stomacher or plackard. Sleeves were puffed and slashed, or elaborately cuffed.

In France, England, and Flanders, the high waistline gradually descended to the natural waist in front (following Spanish fashion) and then to a V-shaped point. Cuffs grew larger and were elaborately trimmed.

Hoop skirts or farthingales had appeared in Spain at the very end of the 15th century, and spread to England and France over the next few decades. Stays also appeared during this period.

A variety of hats, caps, hoods, hair nets, and other headdresses were worn, with strong regional variations.

Shoes were flat, with broad square toes.

=== German fashion ===
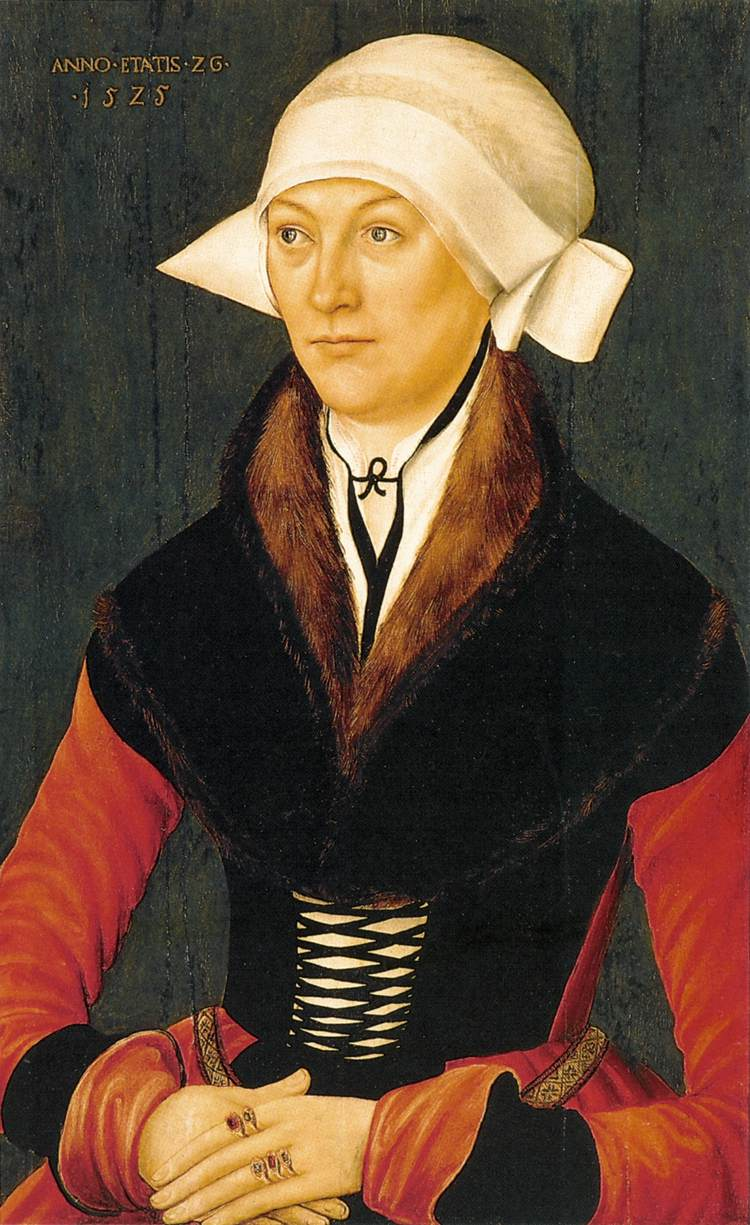
Portrait of a German woman, wears a black round shoulder-capelet Partlet, circa 1525.

In the first half of the 16th century, German dress varied widely from the costume worn in other parts of Europe. Skirts were cut separately from bodices, though often were sewn together, and the open-fronted gown laced over a kirtle with a wide band of rich fabric, often jeweled and embroidered, across the bust. Partlets (called in German gollers or collars) were worn with the low-cut bodice to cover the neck and shoulders and were made in a variety of styles. The most popular goller was a round shoulder-capelet, frequently of black velvet lined in silk or fur, with a standing neckband; this goller would remain in use in some parts of Germany into the 17th century and became part of national dress in some areas.

Narrow sleeves were worn in the earliest years of the century and were later decorated with bands of contrasting fabric and rows of small panes or strips over puffed linings. Skirts were trimmed with bands of contrasting fabric but were closed all around. They would be worn draped up to display an underskirt.

From 1530, elements of Spanish dress were rapidly adopted in fashionable Germany under the influence of the imperial court of Charles V.

=== Gowns ===
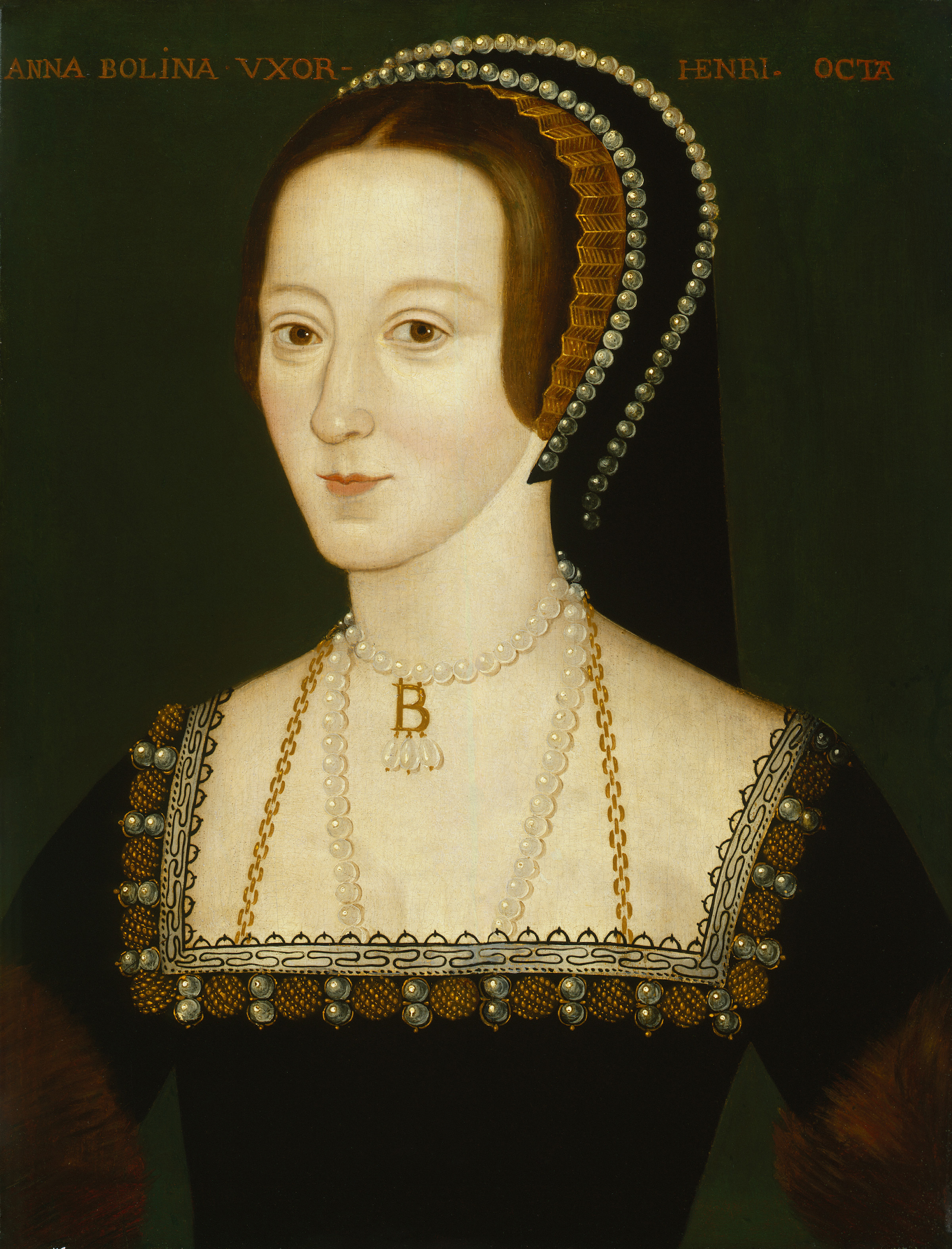
Portrait of Anne Boleyn, wife of Henry VIII of England, depicting Anne in c. 1533, wearing a French hood trimmed with pearls, and a square-necked black velvet gown decorated with the same pearls and embroidery, and furred sleeves.

Dress in Holland, Belgium, and Flanders, now part of the Empire, retained a high, belted waistline longest. Italian gowns were fitted to the waist, with full skirts below.

The French gown of the first part of the century was loosely fitted to the body and flared from the hips, with a train. The neckline was square and might reveal the kirtle and chemise beneath. Cuffed sleeves were wide at the wrist and grew wider, displaying a decorated undersleeve attached to the kirtle. The gown fastened in front early, sometimes lacing over the kirtle or a stomacher, and the skirt might be slit in front or the train tucked up in back to display the skirt of the kirtle.

As a fitted style emerged under Spanish influence, the gown was made as a separate bodice and skirt; this bodice usually fastened at the side or the side-back with hooks and eyes or lacing.

From the 1530s, French and English fashions featured an open, square-necked gown with long sleeves fitted smoothly over a tight, sometimes boned kirtle or pair of bodies, (later in the century) and a farthingale. With the smooth, conical line of the skirt, the front of the kirtle or petticoat was displayed, and a decorated panel called a forepart, heavily embroidered and sometimes jeweled, was pinned to the petticoat or directly to the farthingale.

The earlier cuffed sleeves evolved into trumpet sleeves, tight on the upper arm and flared below, with wide, turned-back cuffs (often lined with fur) worn over full undersleeves that might match the decorated forepart. At the very end of the period, full round sleeves (perhaps derived from Italian fashions) began to replace the flaring trumpet sleeves, which disappeared by the later 1550s.

Fabric or chain girdles were worn at the waist and hung down to roughly knee length; a tassel or small prayer book or purse might be suspended from the girdle.

The low neckline of the dress could be filled with a partlet. Black velvet partlets lined in white with a high, flared neckline were worn pinned over the gown. Partlets of the same rich fabric as the bodice of the gown give the appearance of a high-necked gown. Sheer or opaque linen partlets were worn over the chemise or smock, and high-necked smocks began to appear; toward 1550 these might have a small standing collar with a ruffle, which would become the pleated ruff of the next period.

=== Commoner's dress ===
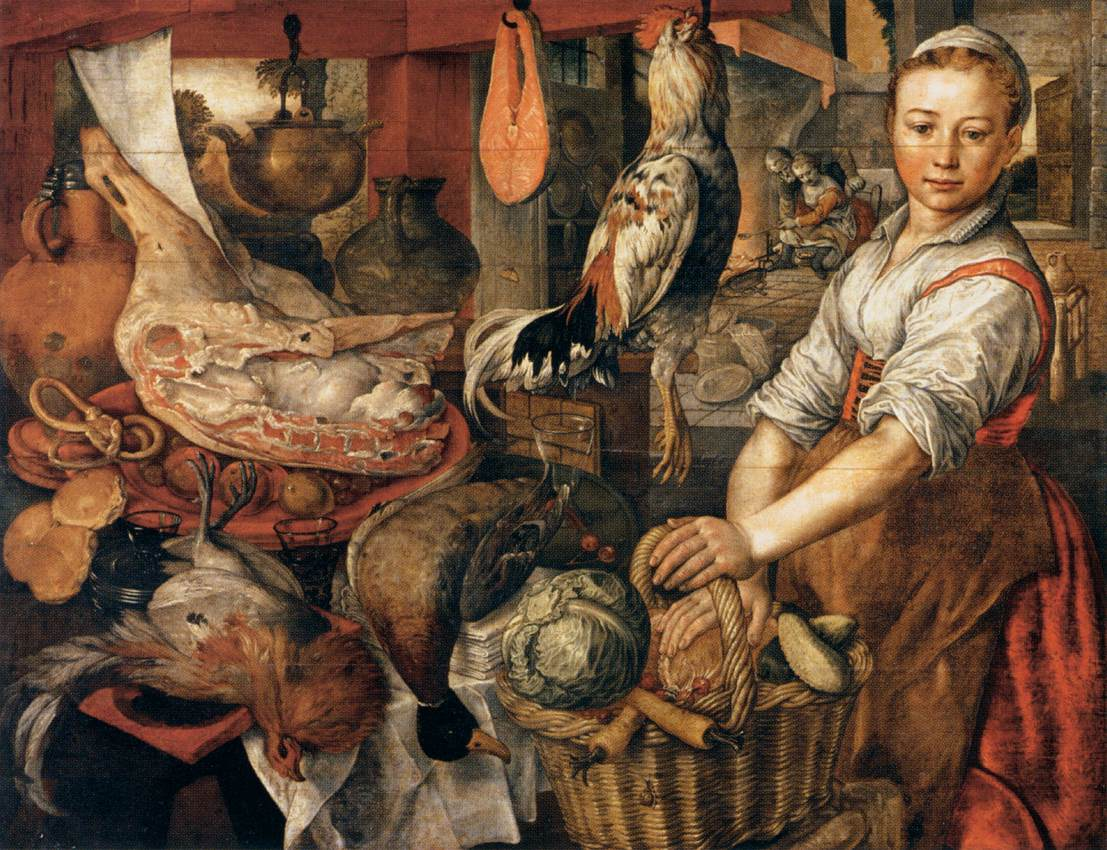
A woman wears a red kirtle over her smock by Joachim Beuckelaer, (1566).

For the middle and lower classes, clothing would have been a much more practical affair. Over the smock, the kirtle would be worn. Depending on the weather and occasion, a simple gown would have been worn over the kirtle. This gown could be laced in the front or could sometimes be closed at the side of the bodice with hooks and eyes. The kirtle would most likely be laced, stiffened with buckram or sometimes reed, and made of wool. There are not many surviving pieces of clothing attributed to the lower classes, so most information is taken from portraits.

=== Hats and headgear ===
In France, England, and the Low Countries, black hoods with veils at the back were worn over linen undercaps that allowed the front hair (parted in the middle) to show. These hoods became more complex and structured over time.

Unique to England was the gable hood, a wired headdress shaped like the gable of a house. In the 16th century, gable headdress had long embroidered lappets framing the face and a loose veil behind; later the gable hood would be worn over several layers that completely concealed the hair, and the lappets and veil would be pinned up in a variety of ways.

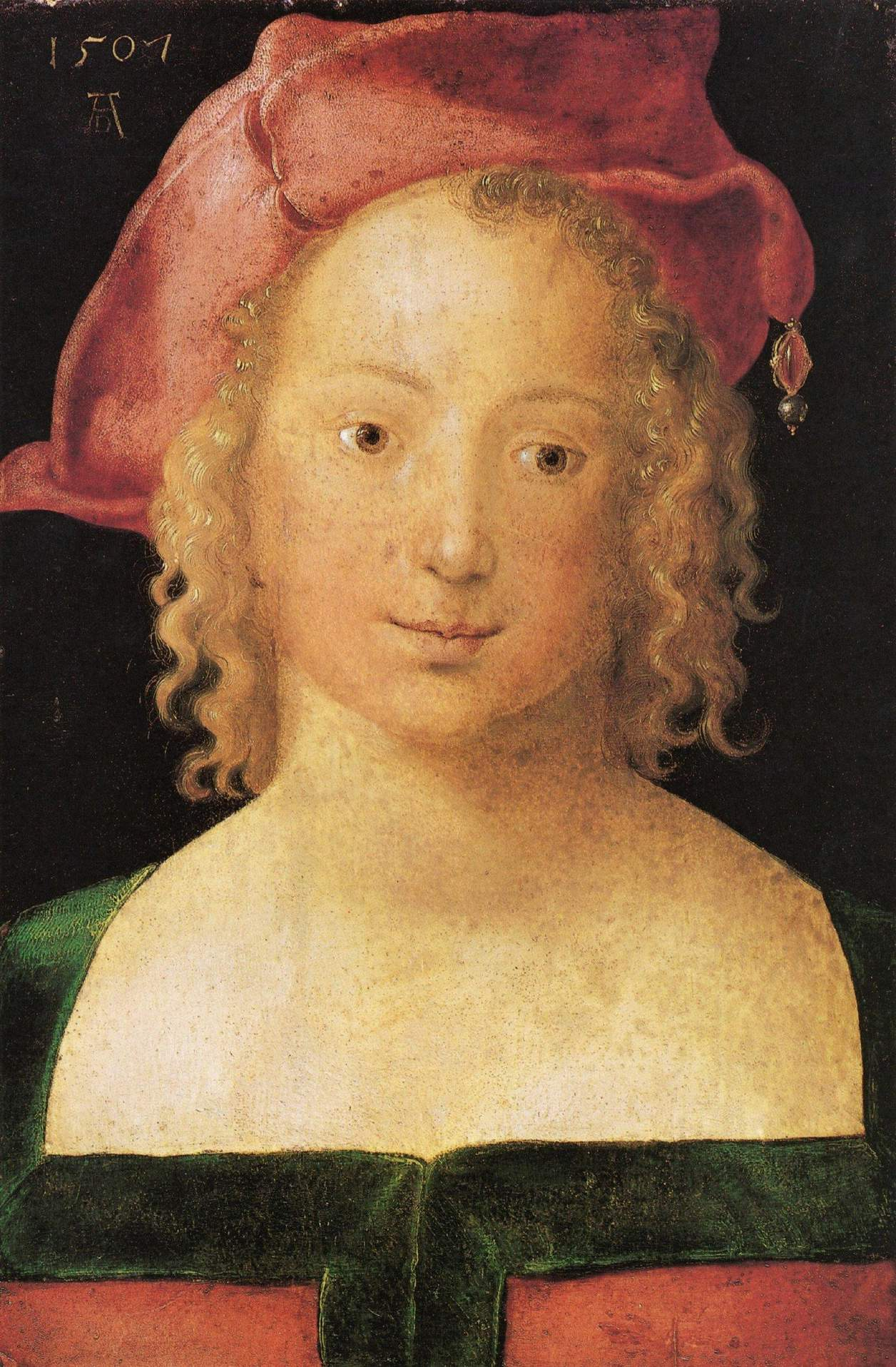
Albrecht Dürer's Young Woman of 1507 wears hat called a barett, popular in the German states.

A simple rounded hood of the early years of the century evolved into the French hood, popular in both France and England; its arched shape sat further back on the head and displayed the front hair which was parted in the center and pinned up in braids or twists under the veil.

German women adopted hats like fashionable men's baretts early in the century; these were worn over caps or cauls (colettes) made of netted cord over a silk lining. Hats became fashionable in England as an alternative to the hood toward the 1540s. Close fitting caps of fur were worn in cold climates.

Linen caps called coifs were worn under the fur cap, hood or hat.

In warmer climates including Italy and Spain, hair was more often worn uncovered, braided or twisted with ribbons and pinned up, or confined in a net. A Spanish style of the later 15th century was still worn in this period: the hair was puffed over the ears before being drawn back at chin level into a braid or wrapped twist at the nape.

First-time brides wore their hair loose, in token of virginity, and a wreath or chaplet of orange blossoms was traditional. A jeweled wreath with enameled "orange blossoms" was sometimes worn.

=== Jewellery and accessories ===
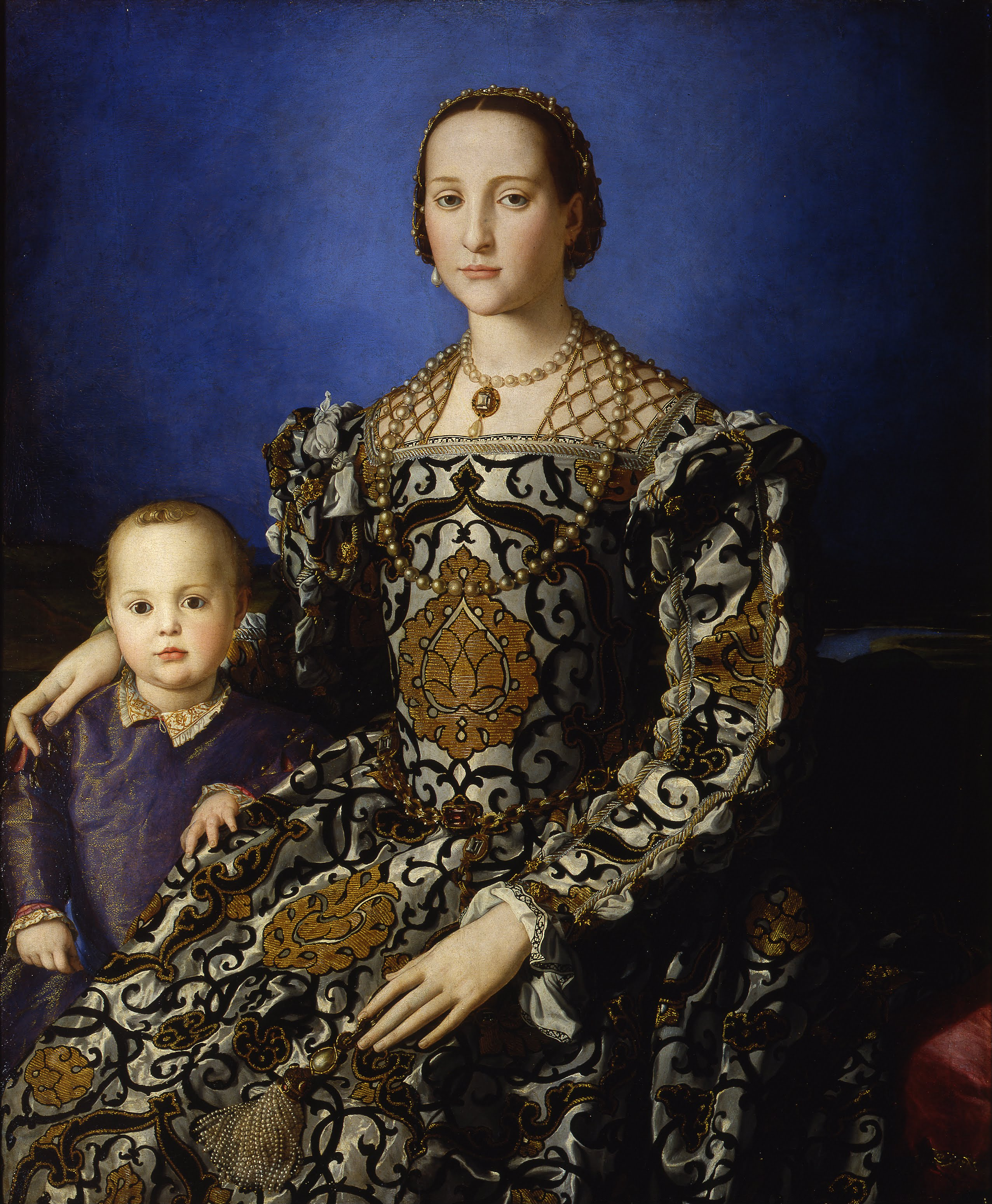
Portrait of Eleanor of Toledo, depicted here wearing a pair of pearl earrings, pearl necklaces, golden belt, decorated with jewels and beads with a tassel, may have been made by the goldsmith Benvenuto Cellini.

Women of wealth wore gold chains and other precious jewelry: collar-like necklaces called carcanets, earrings, bracelets, rings, and jewelled pins. Bands of jeweler's work were worn as trim by the nobility, and would be moved from dress to dress and reused. Large brooches were worn to pin overpartlets to the dress beneath.

Dress hooks, of silver gilt for the wealthy and of base metal for the lower classes, were worn to loop up skirts. Chatelaine was a common accessory for women, as it was often hung from below the belt as an extension, either decorated with charms or used as tools by working women. This can be seen in many paintings at the time and on gravestones. The accessory was a staple until it was replaced by the purse in the late 1800s.

A fashionable accessory was the zibellino, the pelt of a sable or marten worn draped at the neck or hanging at the waist; some costume historians call these "flea furs". The most expensive zibellini had faces and paws of goldsmith's work with jewelled eyes.

=== Beauty standards ===
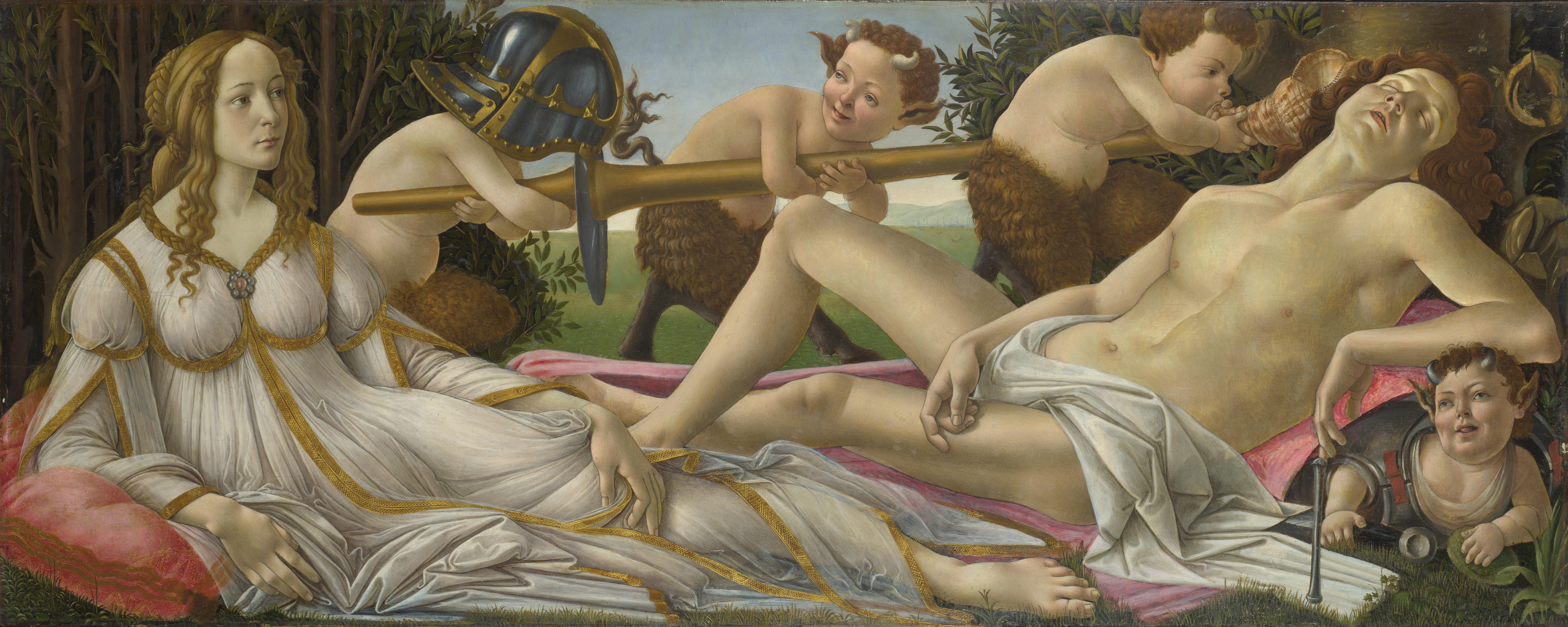
Venus and Mars, c. 1483. Tempera on panel, 69 cm x 173 cm

Portraits produced during the Renaissance provide an invaluable resource for visualizing and understanding the beauty ideals of the period. Sandro Botticelli's Venus and Mars, painted between 1480 and 1490 depicts Venus as the ultimate amalgamation of female physical beauty. Her face is perfectly symmetrical, her skin is unblemished and pure white, her hair is light in colour and slightly waved, her forehead is high, her eyebrows are severely arched, her lips are red and full and her abdomen and hips protrude slightly under her thin garment.

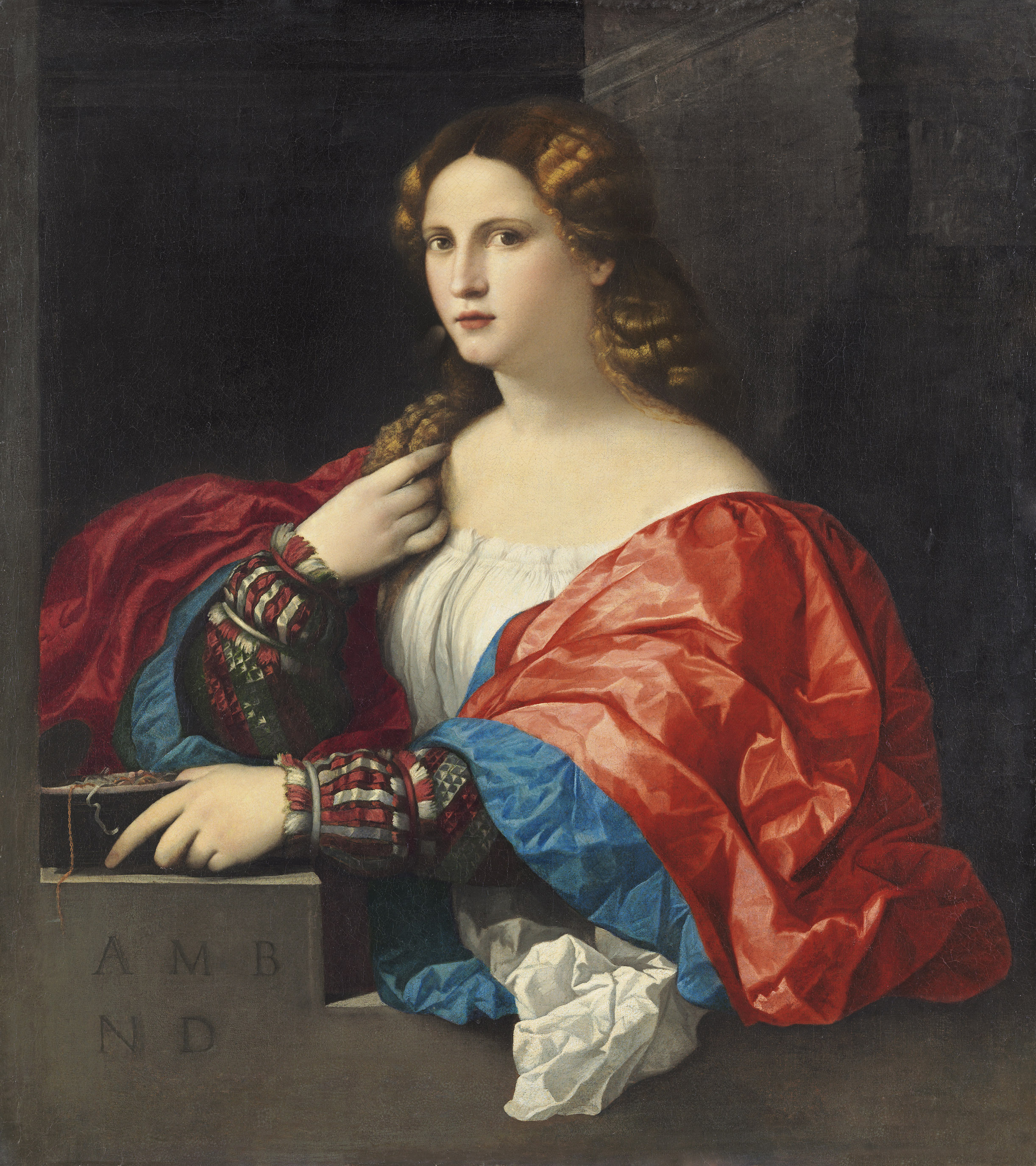
Palma, Jacopo (il Vecchio) - La Bella - c. 1525

Women sometimes applied toxic substances to their faces and chests such as mercury, alum, and ceruse to lighten the skin and remove freckles, as the ideal was loosely 'natural'. However, these products, such as ceruse, a lead derivative, severely irritated the skin, leaving women's faces blemished and burned. Although safer alternatives existed, women preferred the consistency and coverage offered by ceruse. Not all cosmetics were dangerous, many women relied on lotions and balms containing almonds, olive oil, lemon juice, bread crumbs, eggs, honey, rosewater and snake fat to clarify and cleanse the skin. Red lips and rosy cheeks were achieved primarily through the application of vermilion; ceruse mixed with organic dyes such as henna and cochineal (a powder made from the ground exoskeleton of insects). In Italy especially, women sought to achieve the light tresses that were viewed as the ideal. Women applied mixtures of lemon juice, alum and white wine and sat in the sun to lighten their hair. In order to produce loose curls, women wrapped hair saturated in gum arabic or beer around clay curlers. Finally, the appearance of a high forehead was achieved by plucking hairs along the hairline, and severely arching or removing the eyebrows altogether. Although at this time, women could not cosmetologically alter the symmetry of their face, or the structure of their nose in order to obtain the ideal, the products available allowed them to come close.

=== Style gallery – German States and the Low Countries 1500s–1520s ===
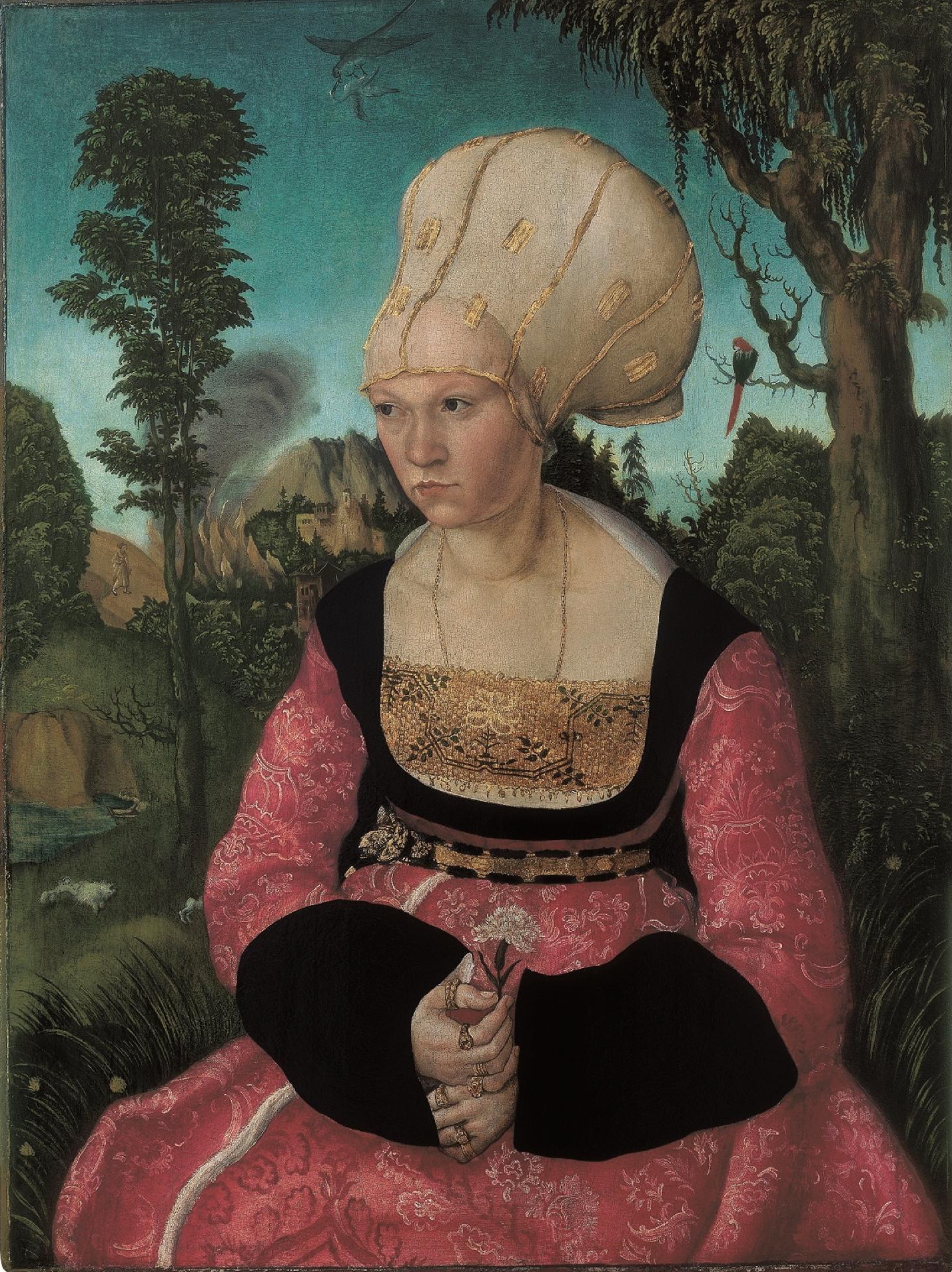
1 – 1502–03

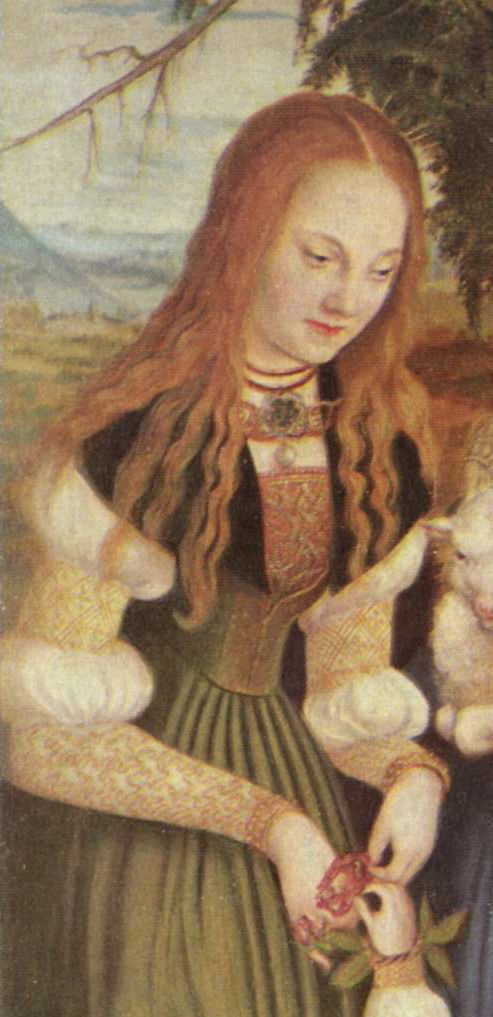
2 – c. 1506

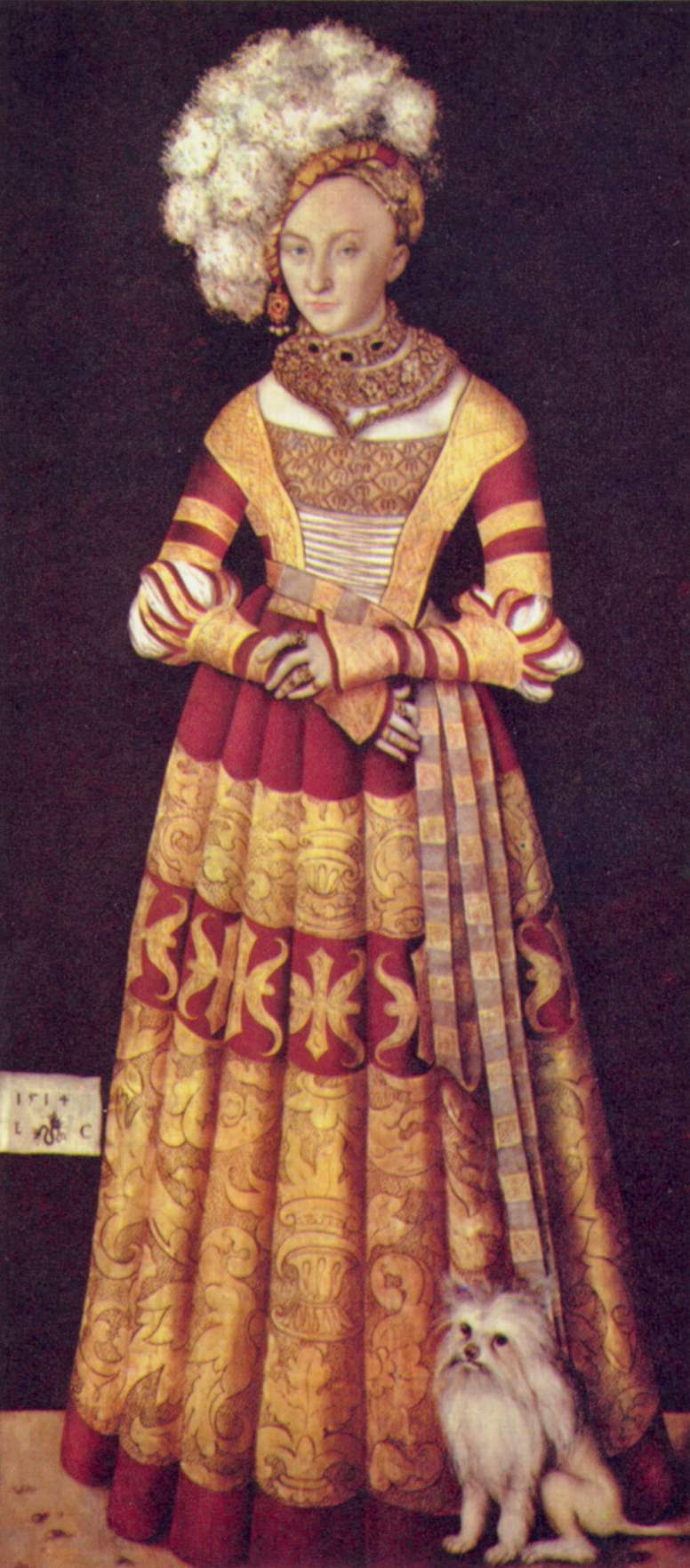
3 – 1514

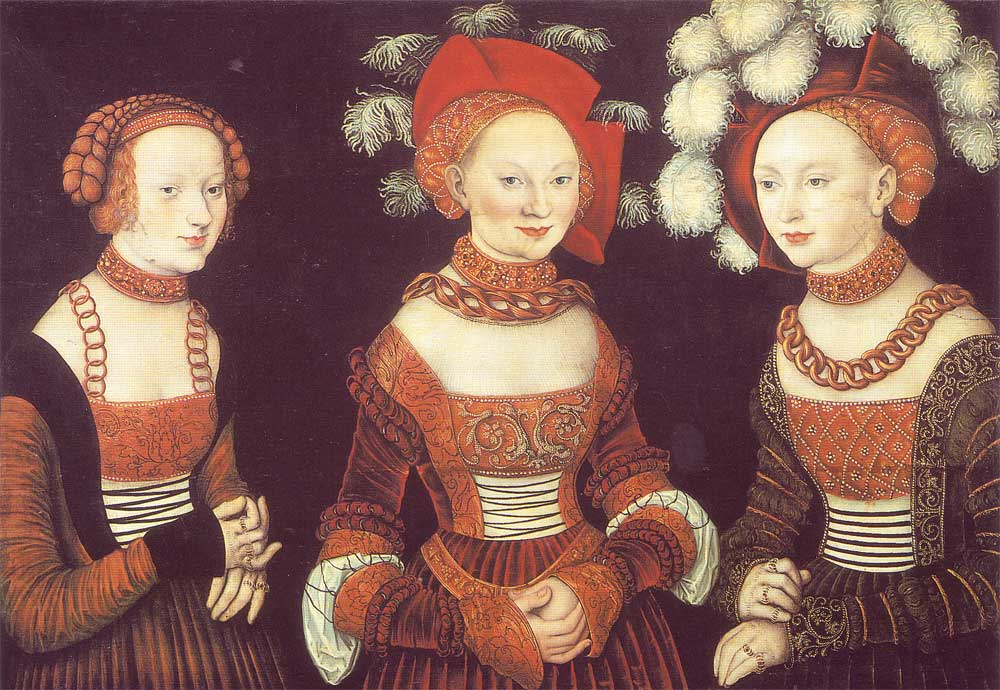
4 – 1525–30

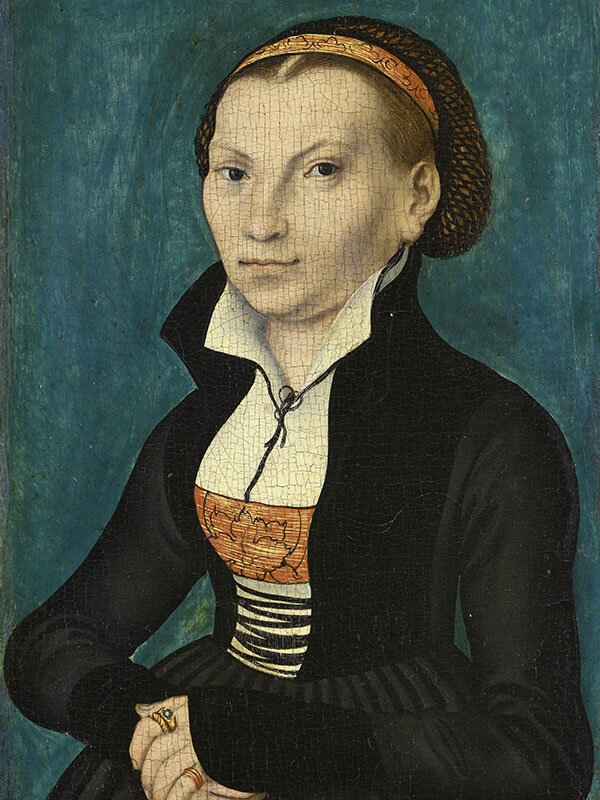
5 – 1526

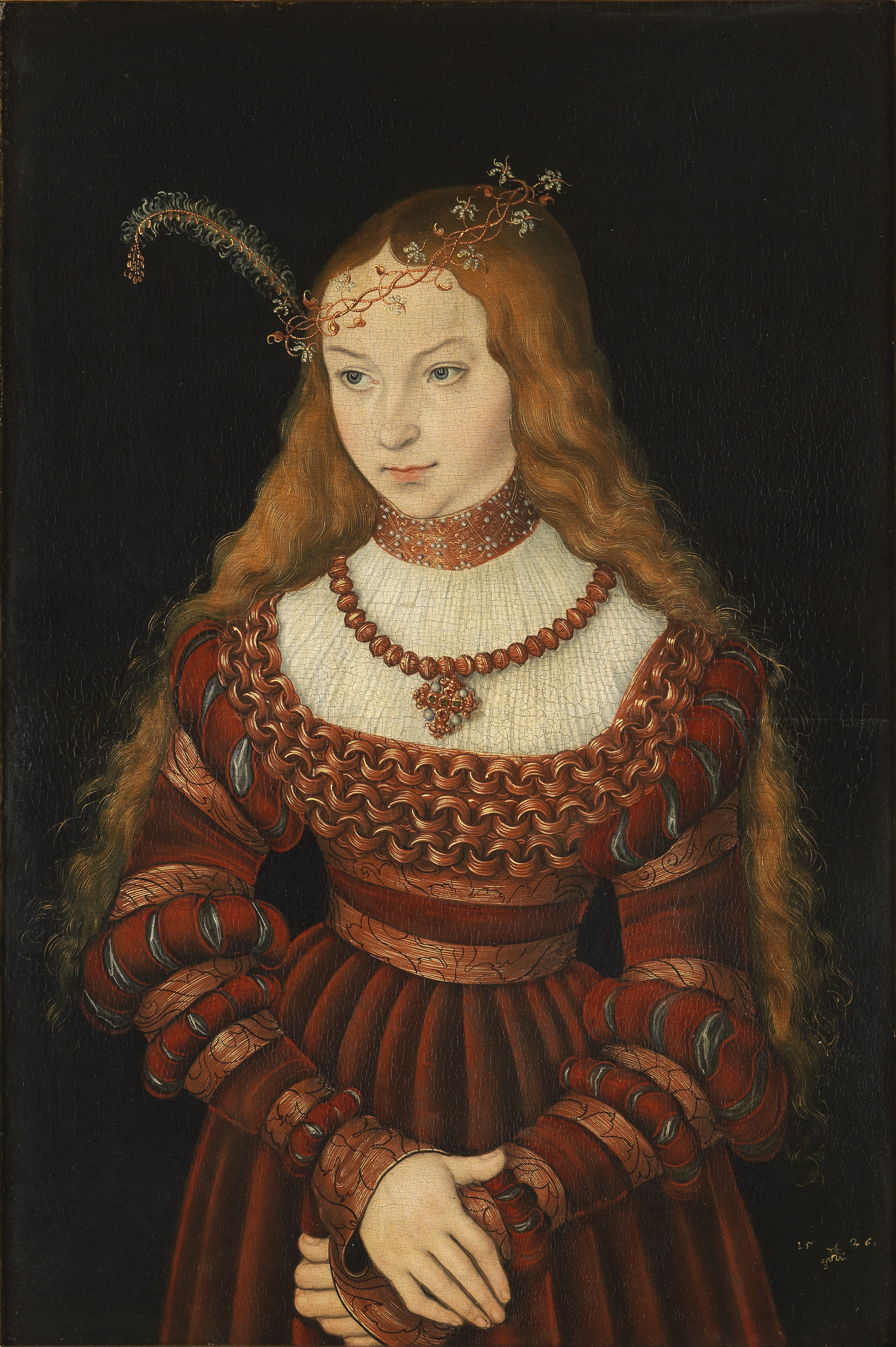
6 – 1526 Bride

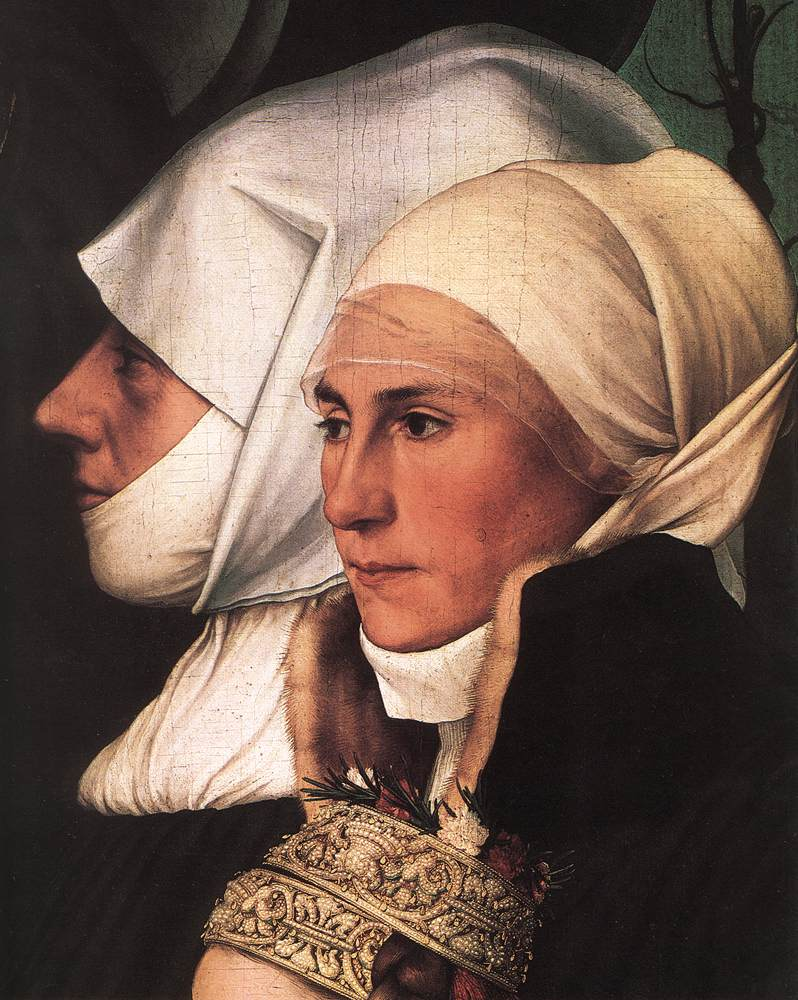
7 – 1526–30

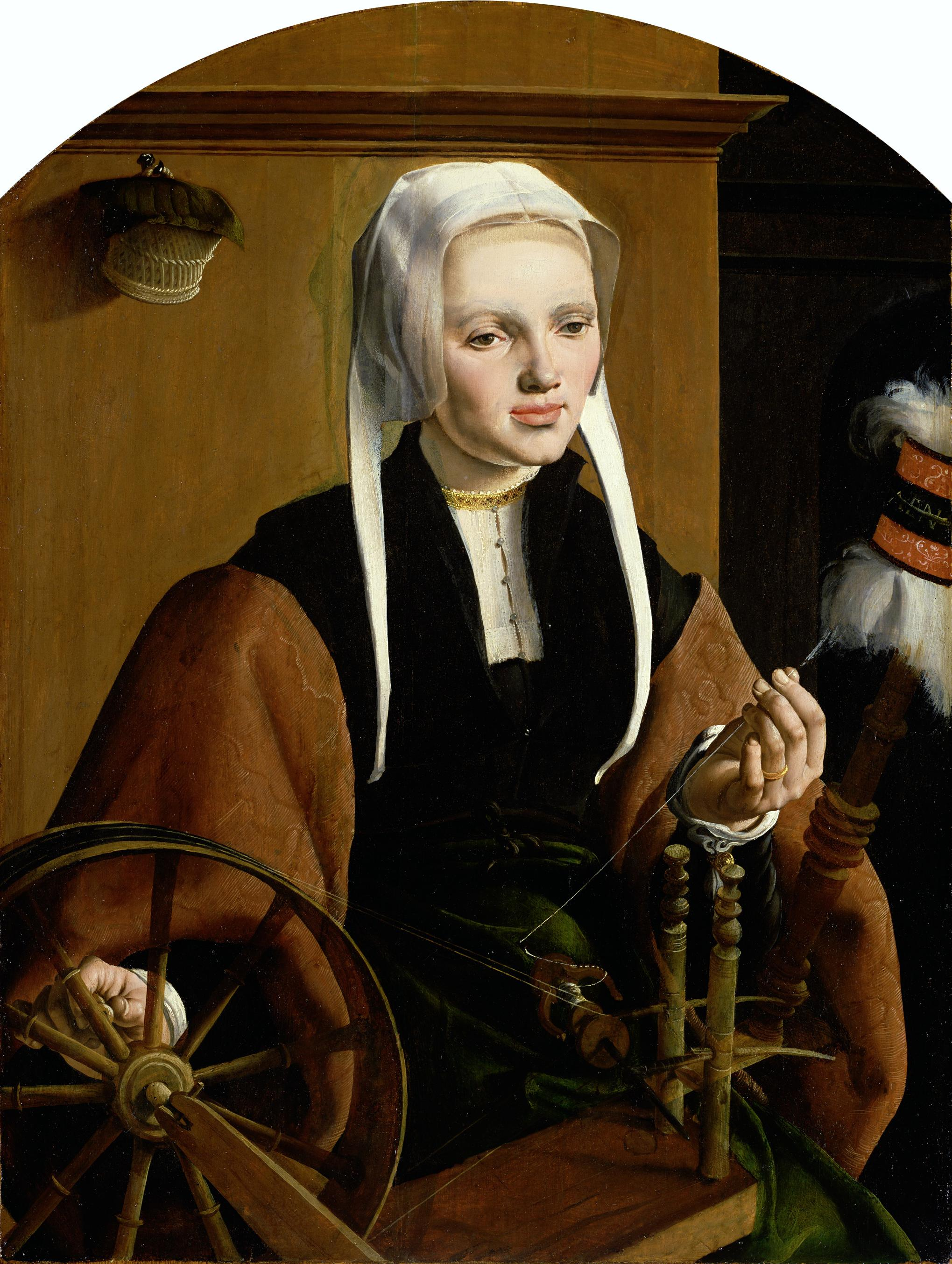
8 – 1529
1. Anna Cuspinian wears a rose-pink brocade gown with a high belt and black collar and cuffs with a large headdress 1502–03.
2. St Dorothea wears a black goller or round partlet over a gown with an organ-pleated skirt and a snug bodice trimmed with embroidery. She wears pieced sleeves derived from Italian styles with puffs at the elbows and shoulders, a heavy gold chain, and a gold filigree carcanet or necklace, 1506.
3. Duchess Katharina von Mecklenburg wears a front-laced gown in the German fashion, with broad bands of contrasting materials, tight sleeves, and slashes at the elbow, 1514.
4. Three ladies in German fashion of 1525–30. Baretts with upturned slashed brims are worn over cauls, and sleeves are variously puffed, pieced, and slashed, with short wide cuffs extending over the hands.
5. Katharina von Bora wears a front-laced grayish gown with black trim. She wears a white partlet edged in black, and her hair is confined in a net or snood, 1526.
6. Princess Sibylle von Cleves as a bride wears a tight-waisted gown with slashed and puffed sleeves over a high-necked chemise with a wide band at the neck. Her loose hair and the jeweled wreath of orange blossoms indicate that this is a bridal painting, 1526.
7. Widows in the Netherlands wear 'barbes' or wimples with linen headdresses, 1526–30.
8. Woman spinning of 1529 wears the linen cap and hood and black partlet characteristic of middle-class costume in the Netherlands in the 1520s.

=== Style gallery – German States and the Low Countries 1530s–1540s ===
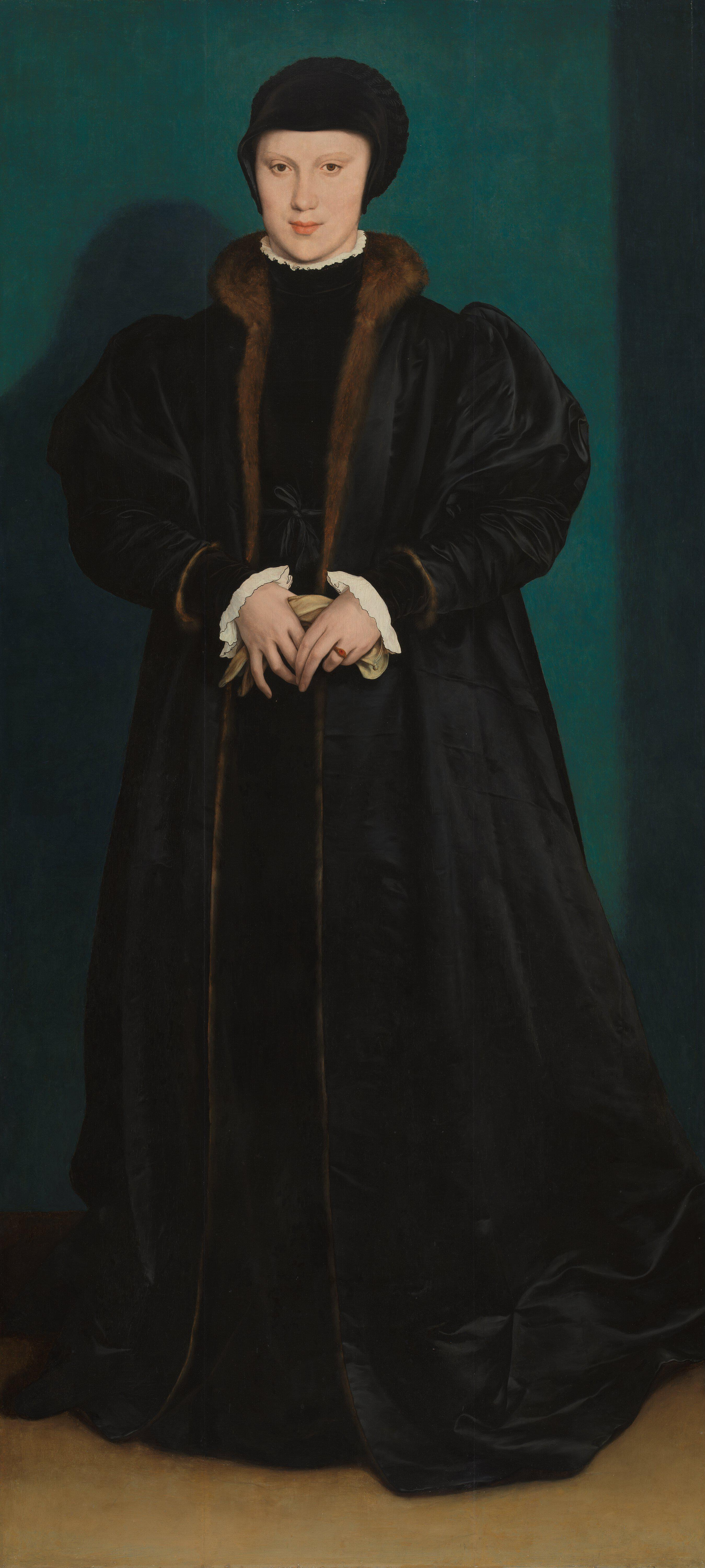
1 – 1538 Mourning

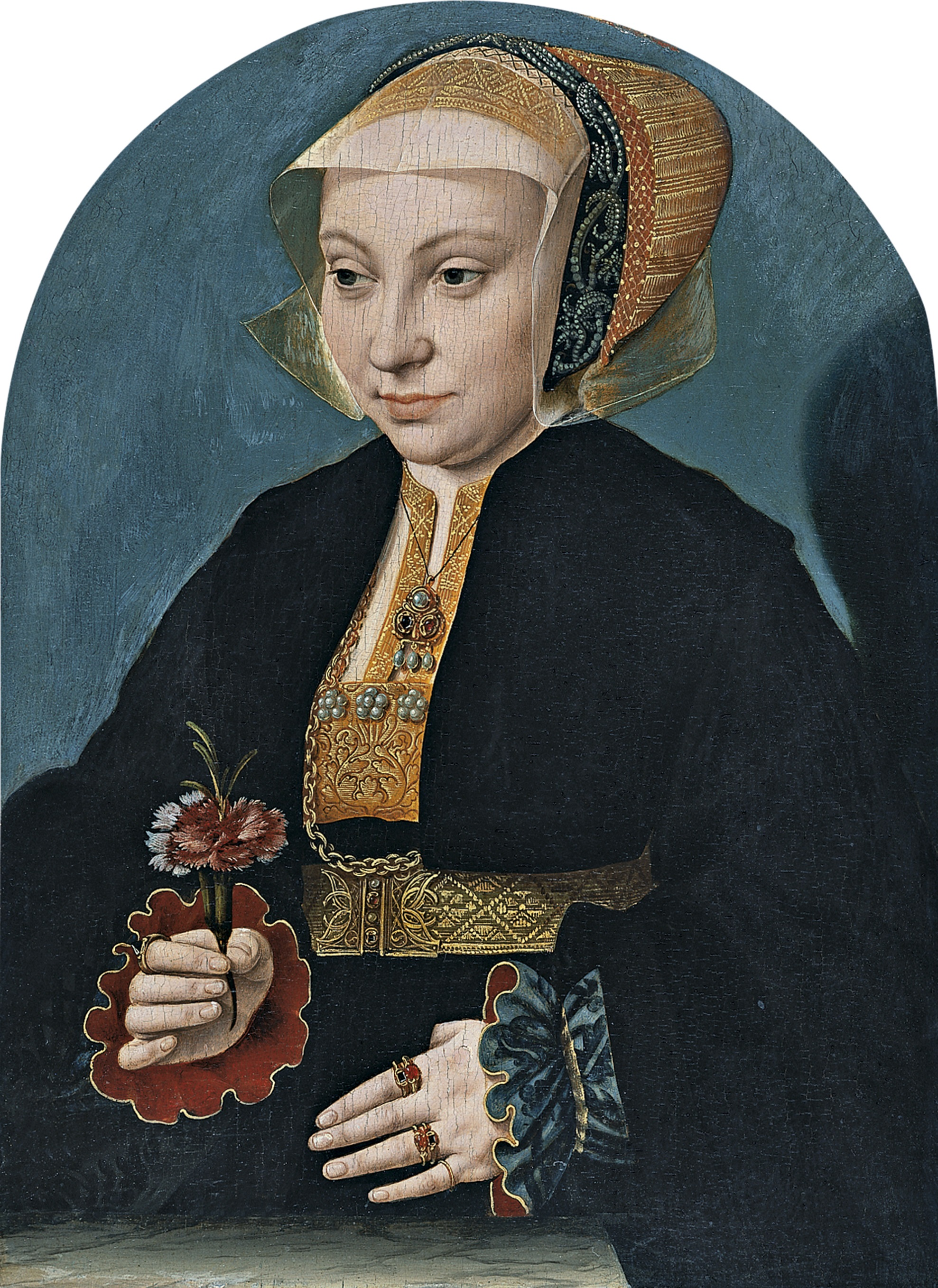
2 – 1538–39

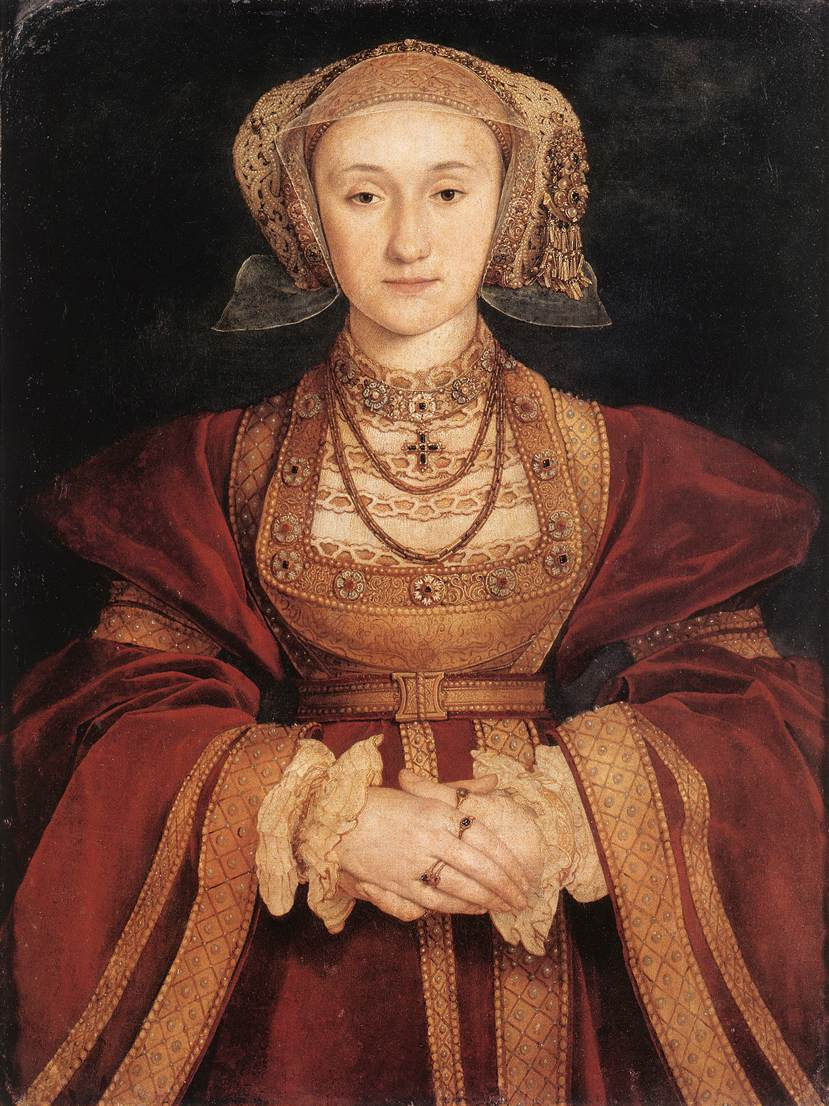
3 – 1539

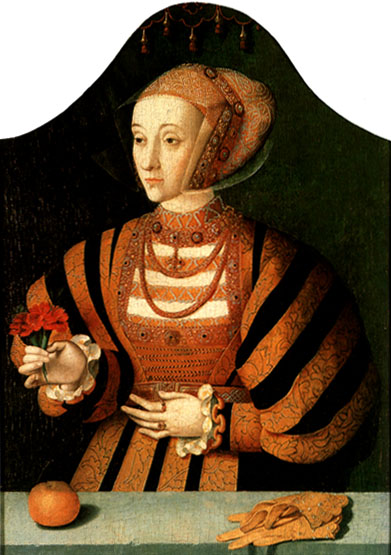
4 – c. 1540s

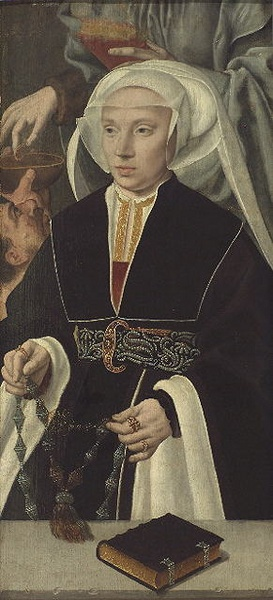
5 – 1542

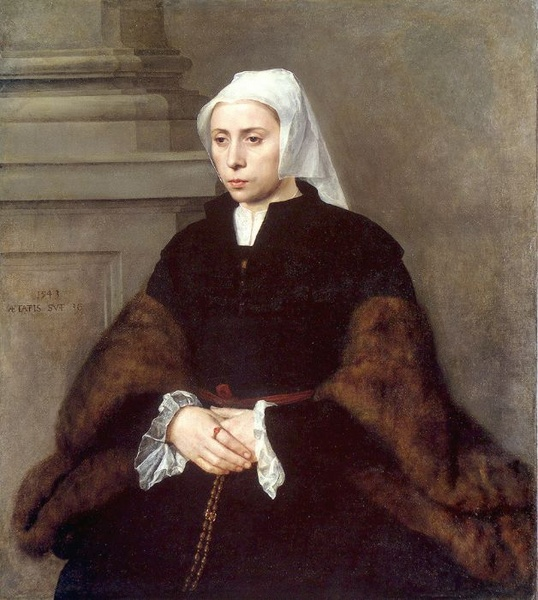
6 – 1542

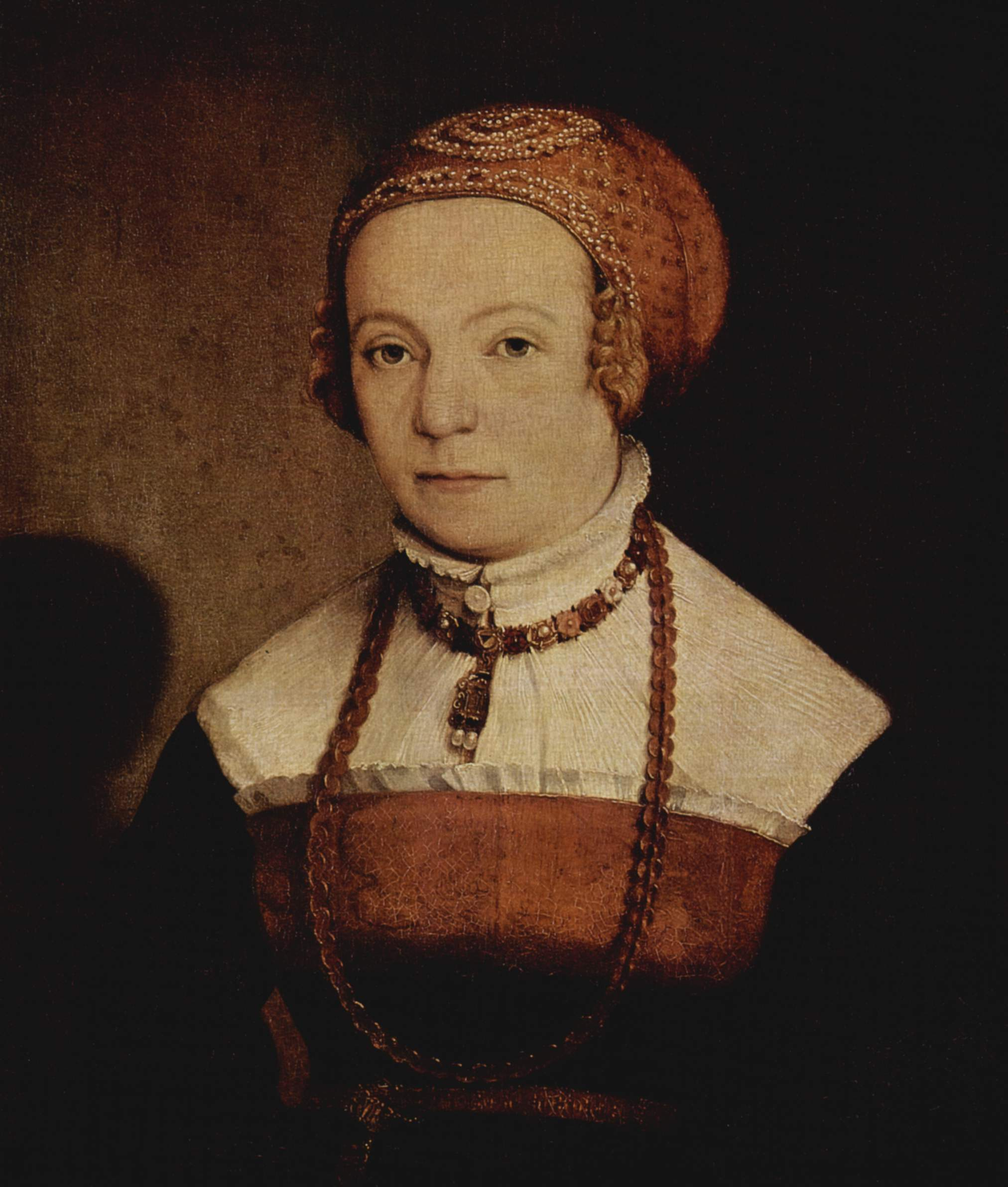
7 – 1545

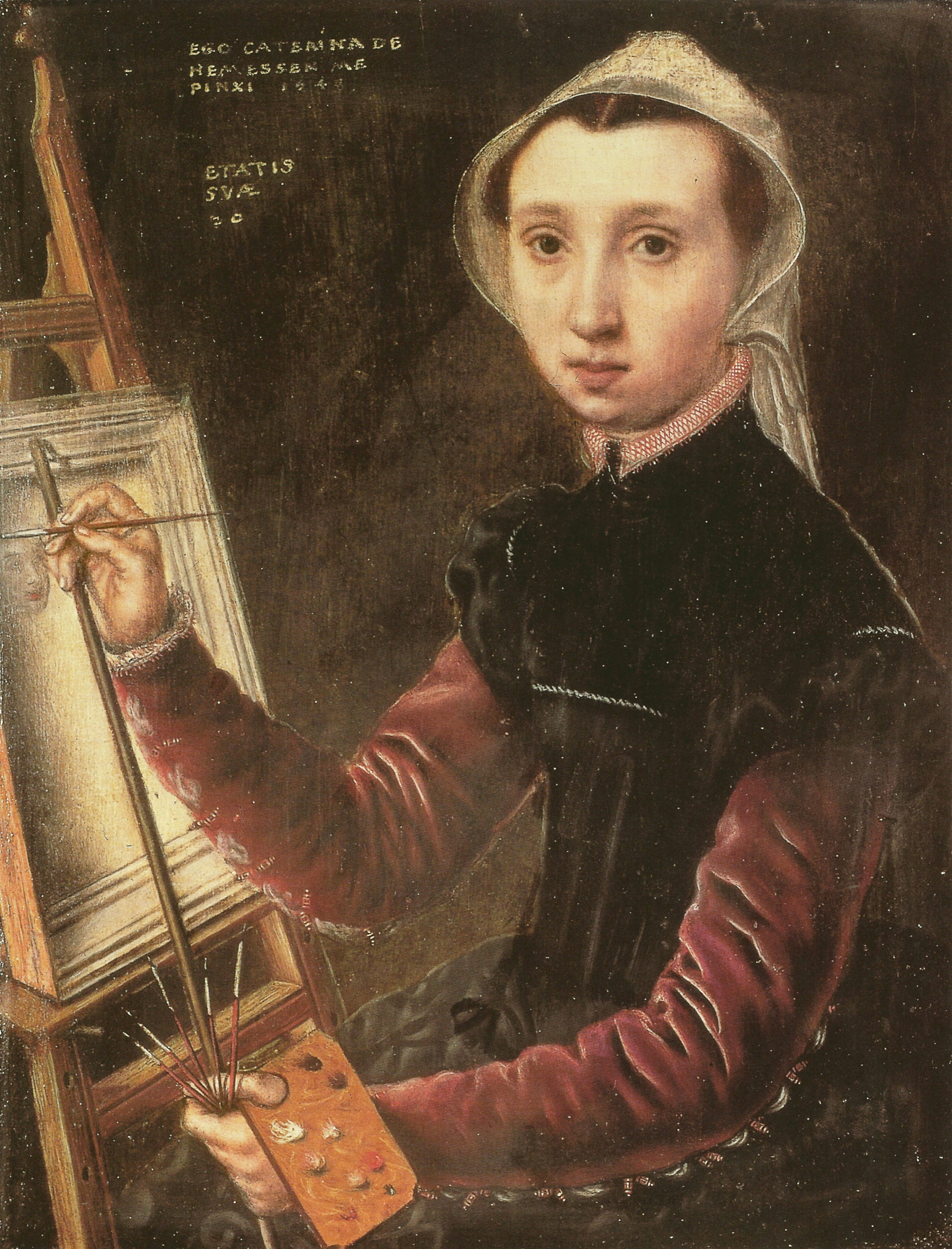
8 – 1548
1. Christina of Denmark, Duchess of Milan in mourning wears a black robe with a fur lining over a black gown. She wears a close-fitting black cap, 1538.
2. German fashion includes a high-waisted gown with wide sleeves trimmed with bands of contrasting fabric worn with a wide belt. Undersleeves (probably attached the kirtle) have ruffled cuffs lined in red. A black parlet is worn. The headdress consists of a decorated cap and a short, sheer veil turned up in "wings" at either cheek, 1538–39
3. Anne of Cleves wears a red gown with a high waist confined with a belt. Her sleeves have broad puffs on the upper arm and wide, open lower sleeves. Her cap or hood has a sheer veil draped over it, 1539.
4. Anne of Cleves wears a front-laced full-sleeved gown of bands of red-gold brocade and black with ruffled cuffs that display the chemise cuffs beneath. Her headdress consists of a short sheer veil and embroidered hood; a red undercap or forehead band is visible at the temples, 1540s.
5. Woman holding a silver rosary wears a linen headdress and veil. Her gown is confined with a wide belt at the high waist, and she wears a black partlet that reveals a red kirtle over her high-necked chemise trimmed with gold embroidery, 1542.
6. Flemish costume of 1542 features turned-back trumpet sleeves lined in fur and a black partlet. The high-necked chemise of fine linen has ruffles at the wrist, and a linen hood with a veil is worn.
7. Christoph Amberger's Unknown Woman wears a finely pleated partlet or high-necked chemise with a high collar and small ruff beneath her gown. Her close-fitting cap may be similar to that worn by Anne of Cleves under her veil, c. 1545.
8. Self-portrait of Caterina van Hemessen show the painter in a black overpartlet and red velvet undersleeves, 1548.

=== Style gallery – Italy and Spain 1500s–1520s ===
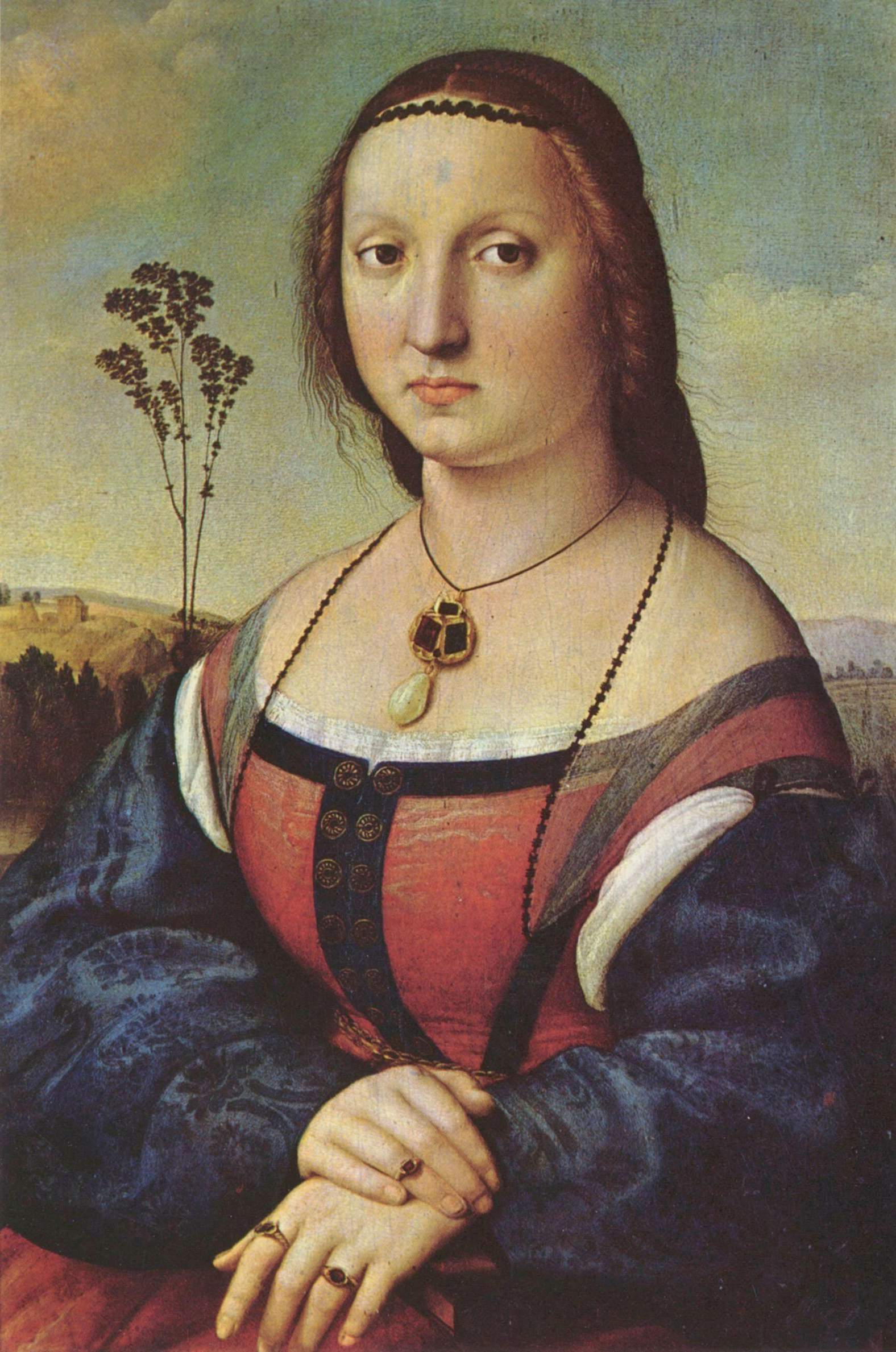
1 – 1505

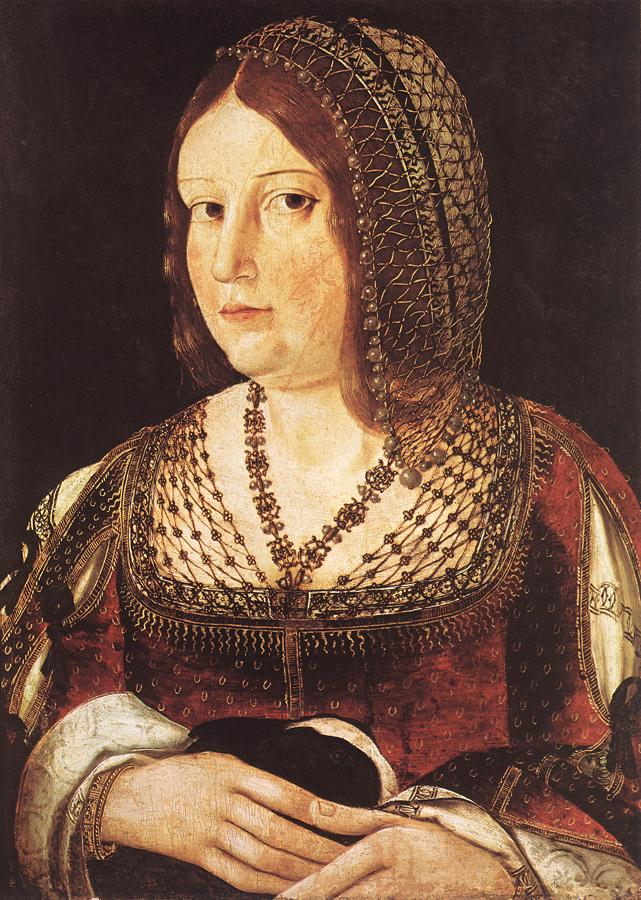
2 – c. 1505

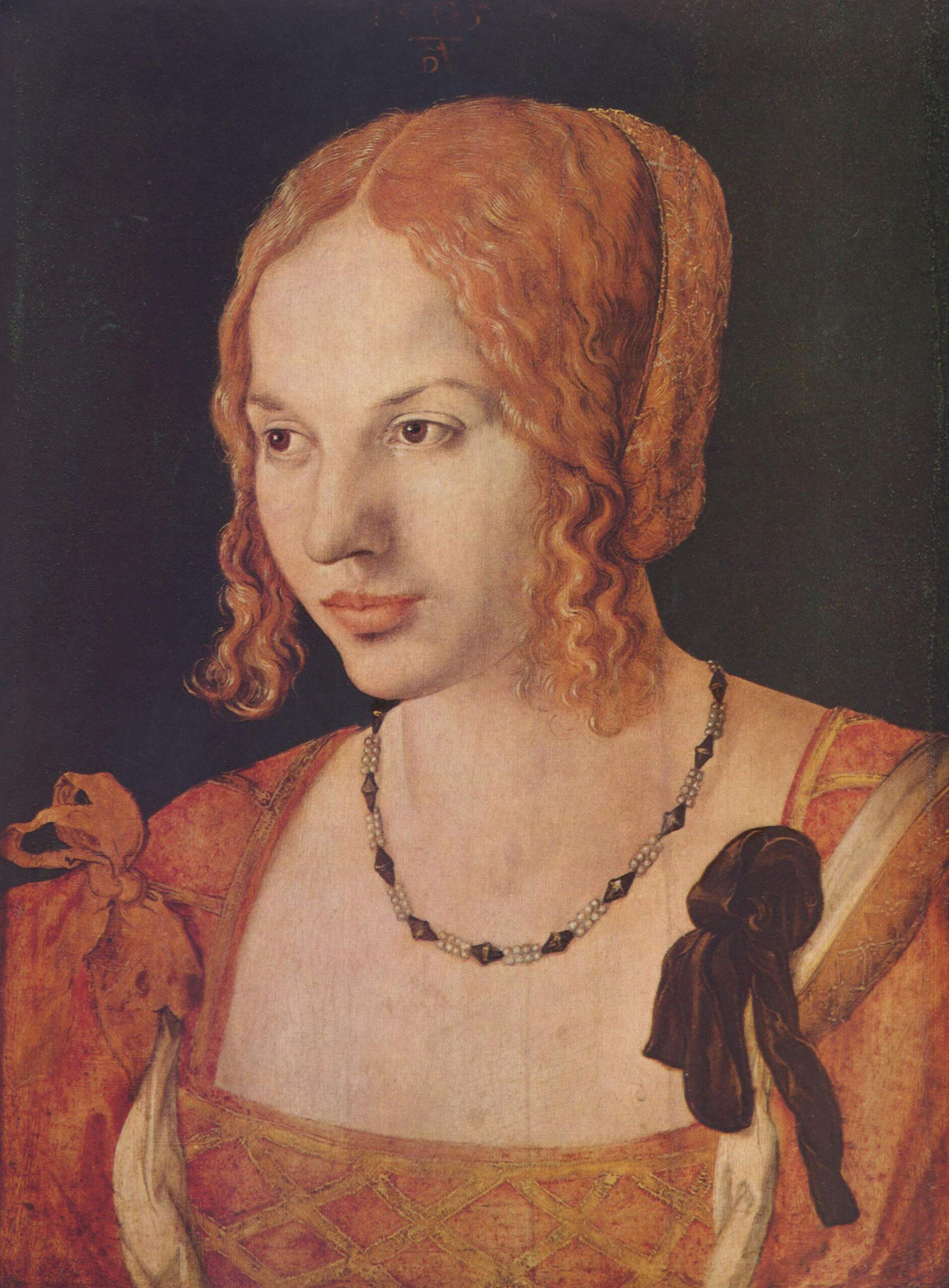
3 – c. 1505

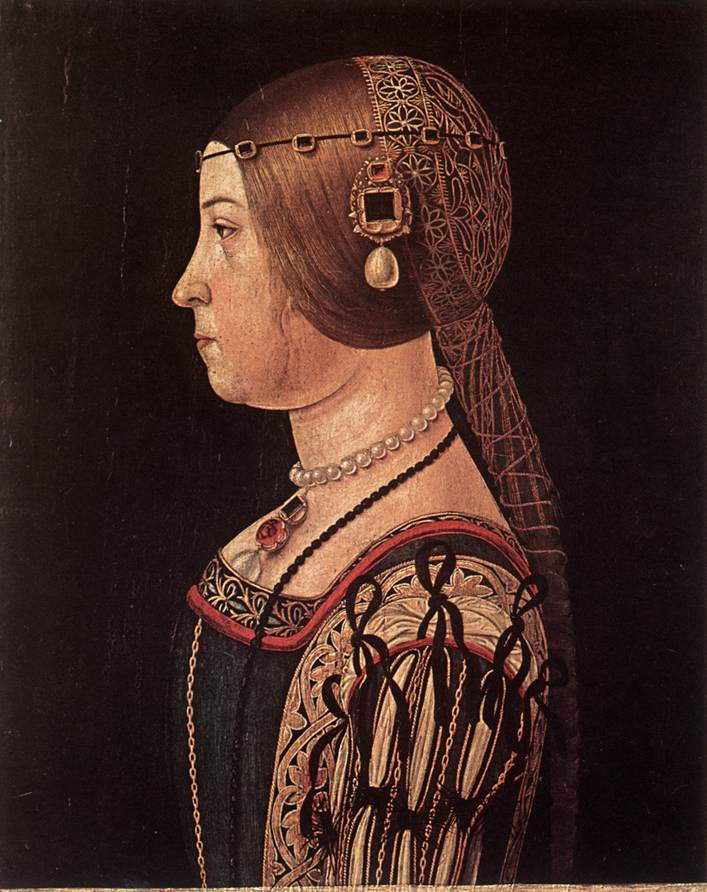
4 – 1510

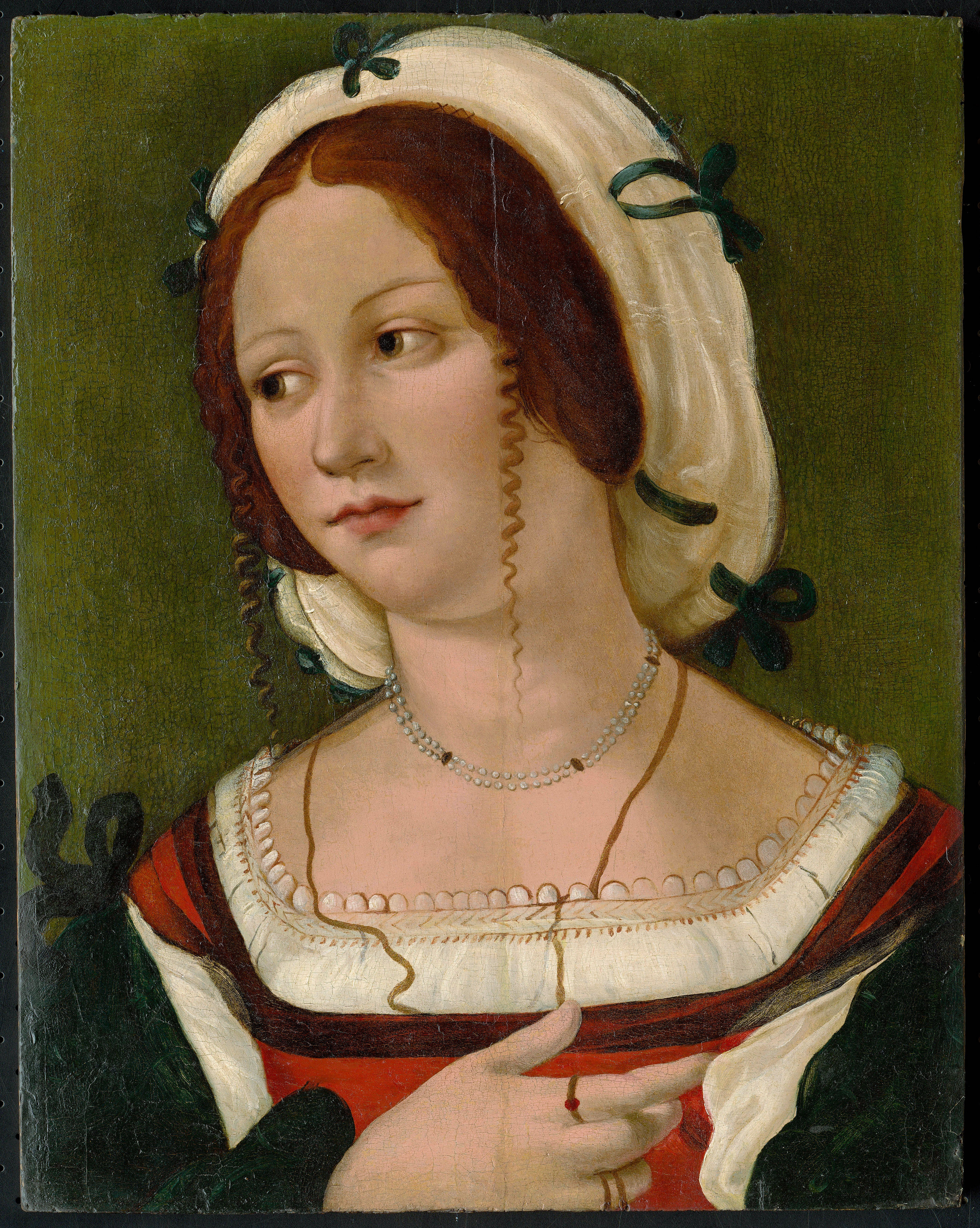
5 – 1511

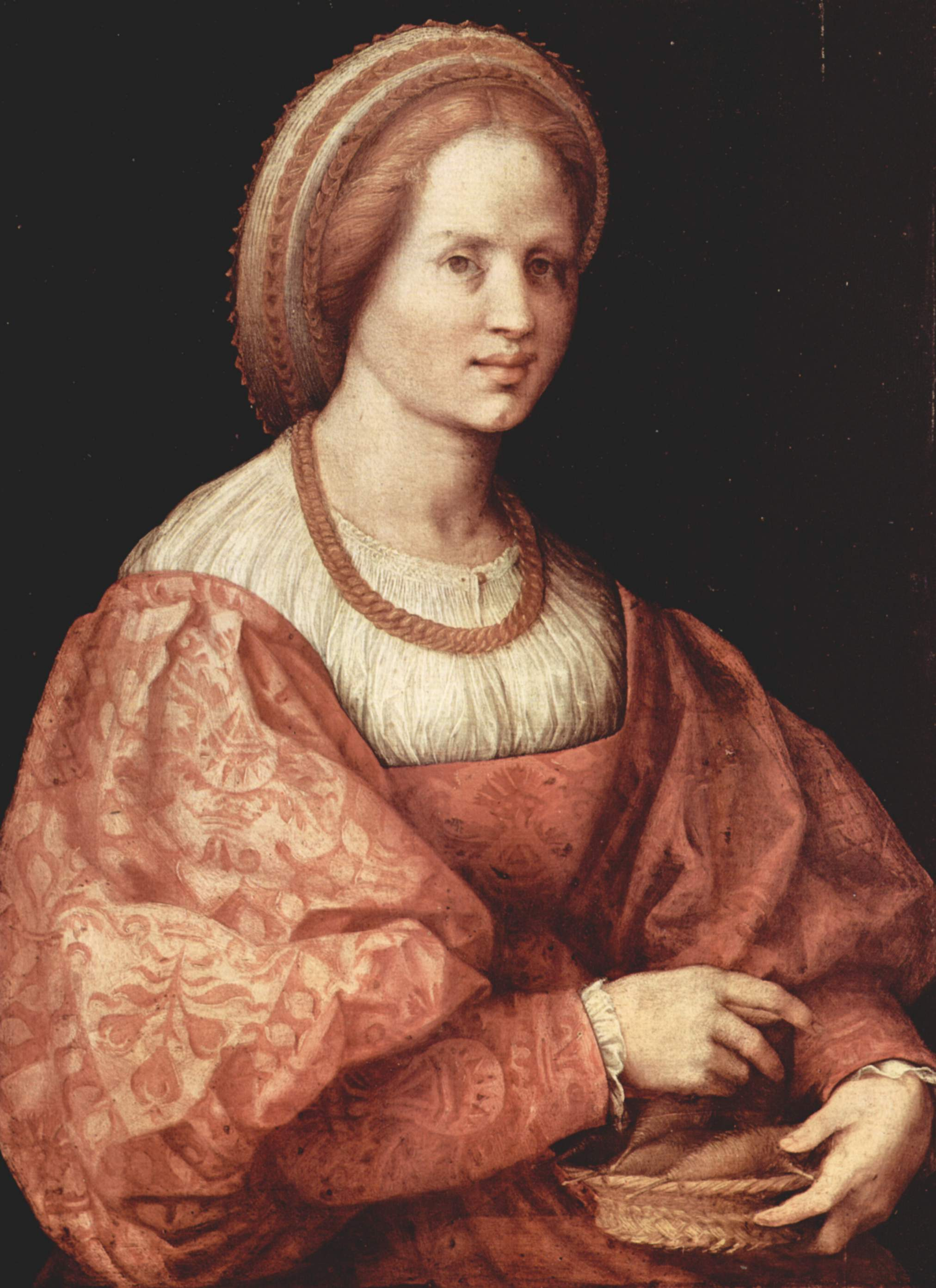
6 – 1516

7 – 1518

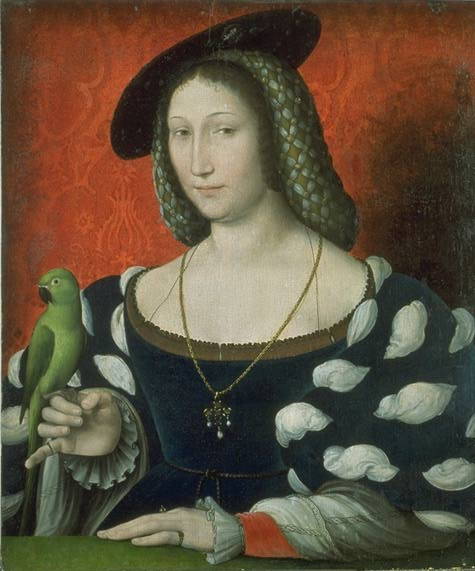
8 – ?1527
1. Maddalena Doni wears a rose-colored gown with contrasting blue sleeves. She wears a sheer shoulder cape or open partlet with a dark edging, 1505.
2. Spanish fashion: A velvet gown with slashed sleeves is worn over a chemise embroidered in black silk at the neckline (visible beneath the net partlet) and in bands down the wide sleeves, Toledo, c. 1505.
3. Venetian woman wears a patterned gown with tied-on sleeves that show the chemise beneath. Her hair frames her face in soft waves, and back hair is confined in a small draped cap, c. 1505.
4. Barbara Palavicino wears slashed sleeves tied in bows at the shoulders. Her long hair is confined in a small embroidered cap and then wrapped in a long tail down her back. She wears a fillet or ferroniere around her forehead.
5. Isabella d'Este is considered an Italian fashion icon and inventor of balzo and flea fur. The presumed portrait from 1511 shows her temple curls, gown with tied-on sleeves and already an early form of the balzo, which is copied in many portraits in the 1520/30s.
6. Italian gown of floral silk has wide, puffed upper sleeves and fitted lower sleeves. Her chemise is high-necked and small frills are visible at the wrists. She wears a heavy gold chain.
7. Dona Isabel de Requesens wears a gown with wide, open sleeves lined in light pink. Her high waist is accentuated with a knotted sash. The full sleeves of her chemise are gathered into ornamented bands, and she wears a broad hat that matches her gown, 1518.
8. Marguerite d'Angoulême wears the Italian style common in Savoy. Her black gown has very large puffed upper sleeves with a white lining pulled through numerous cuts or slashes. Her hair is confined in a bag-like fabric snood under a broad black hat, c. 1527.

=== Style gallery – Italy and Iberia 1530s–1540s ===
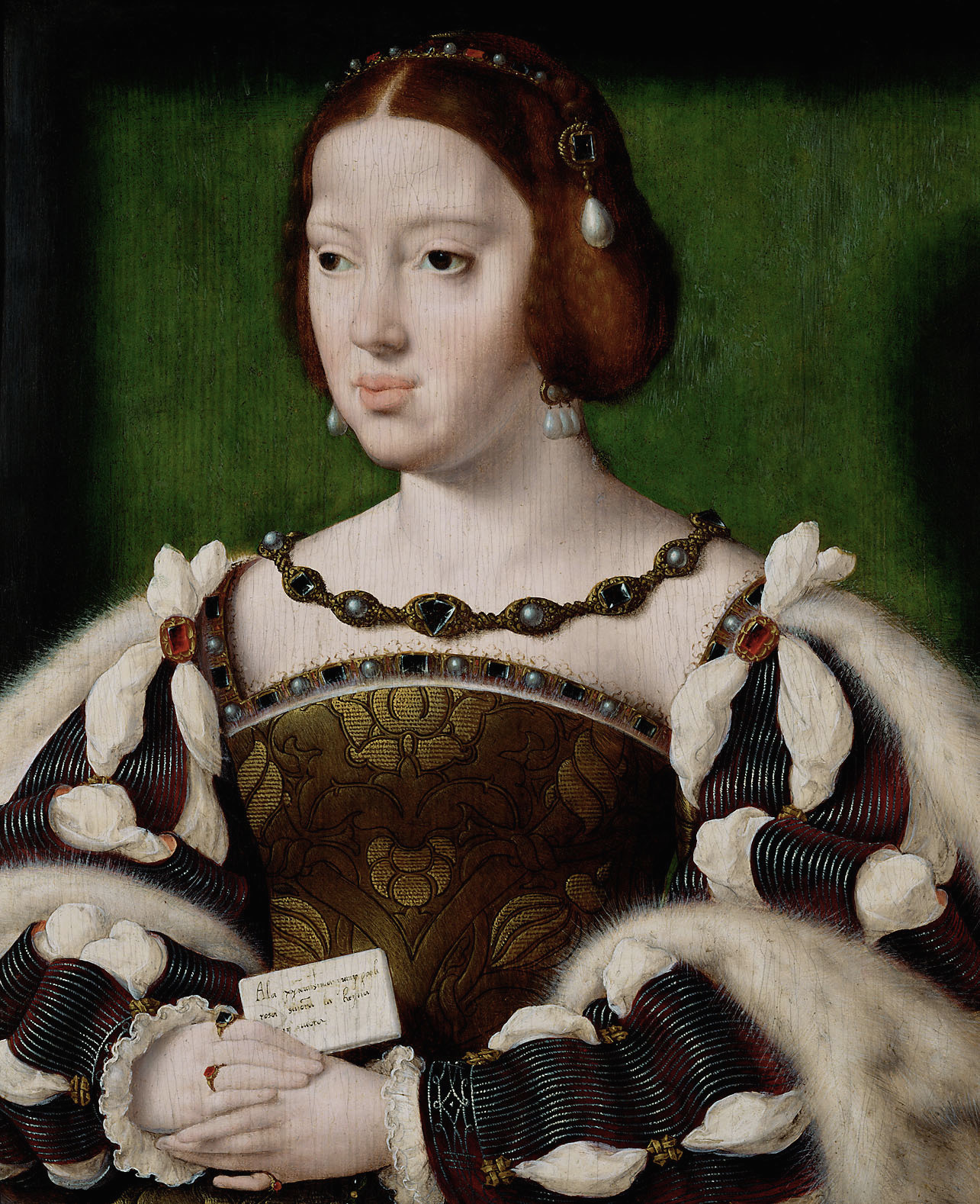
1 – 1530

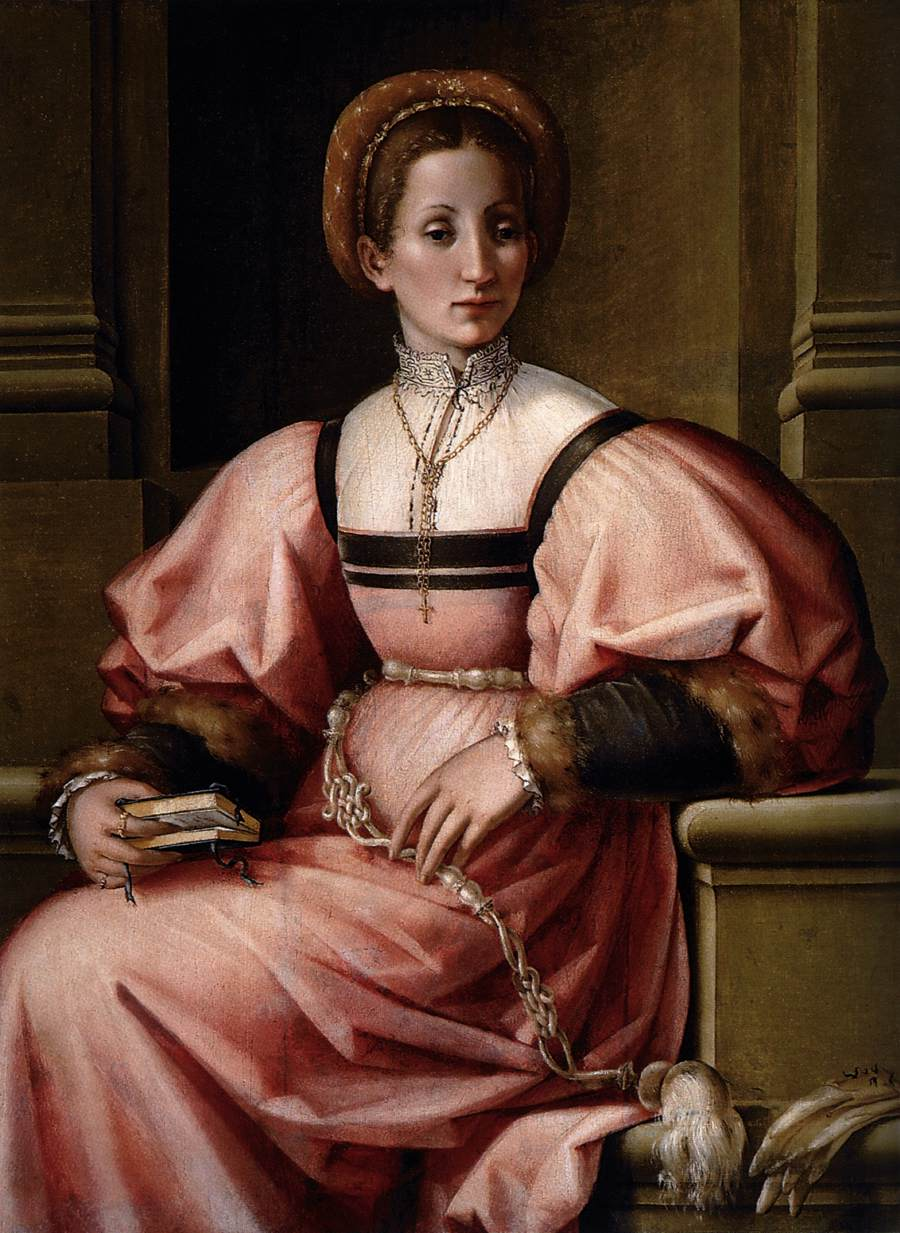
2 – 1530–35

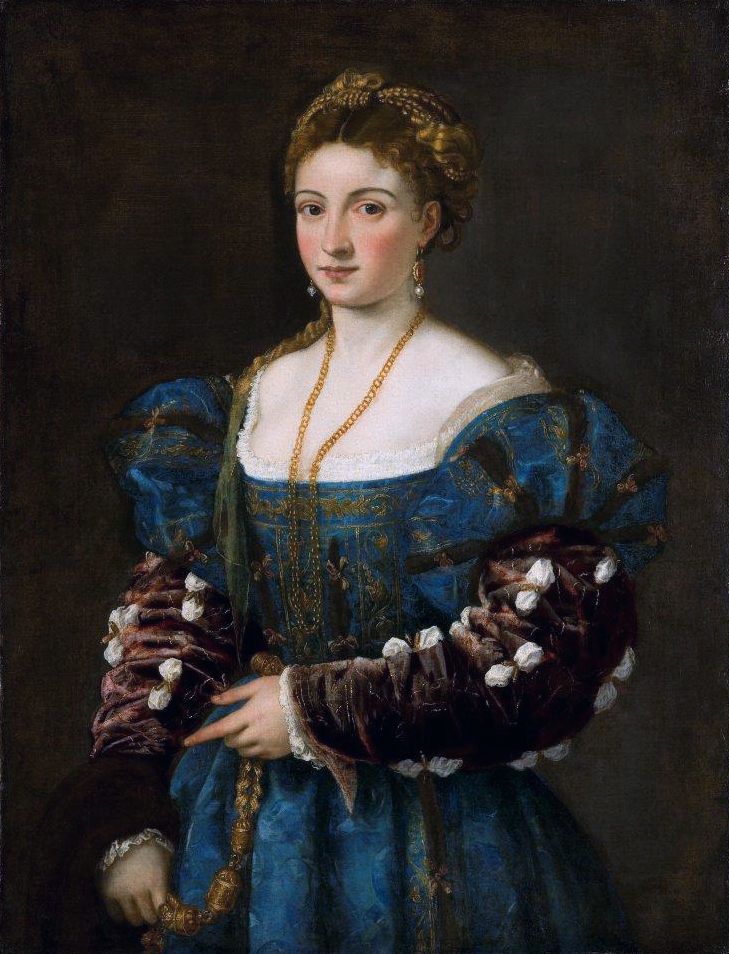
3 – 1536

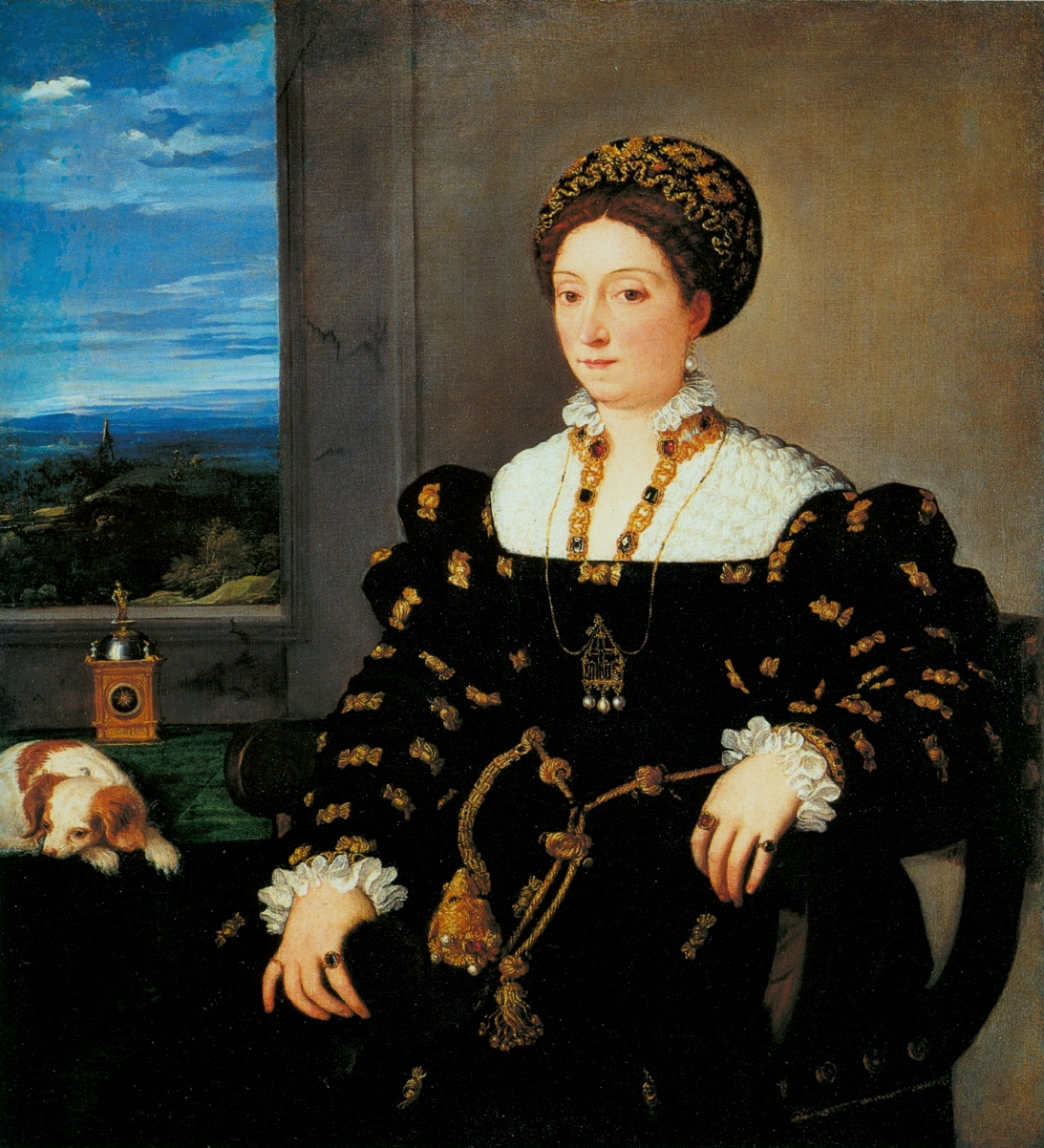
4 – 1538

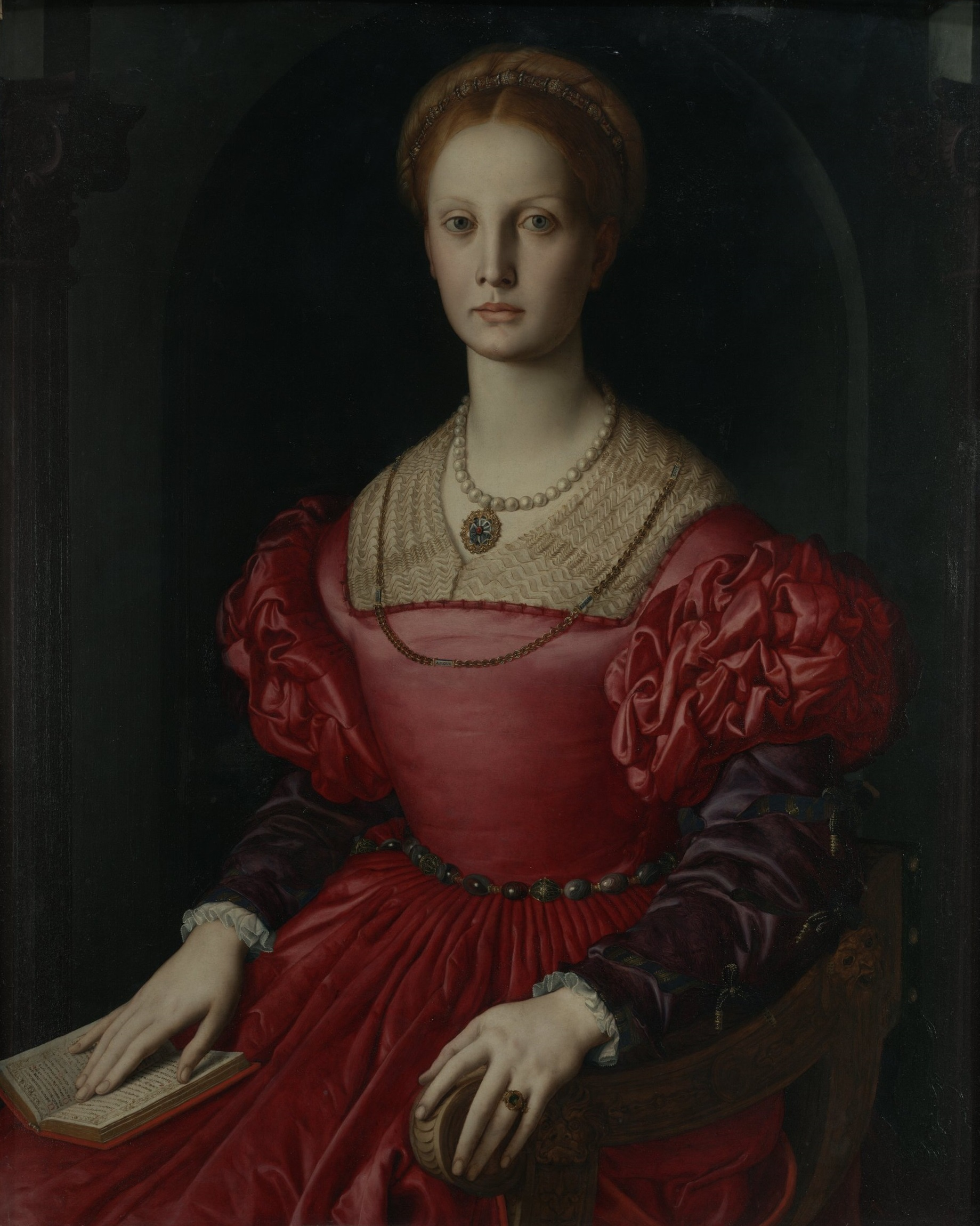
5 – 1540

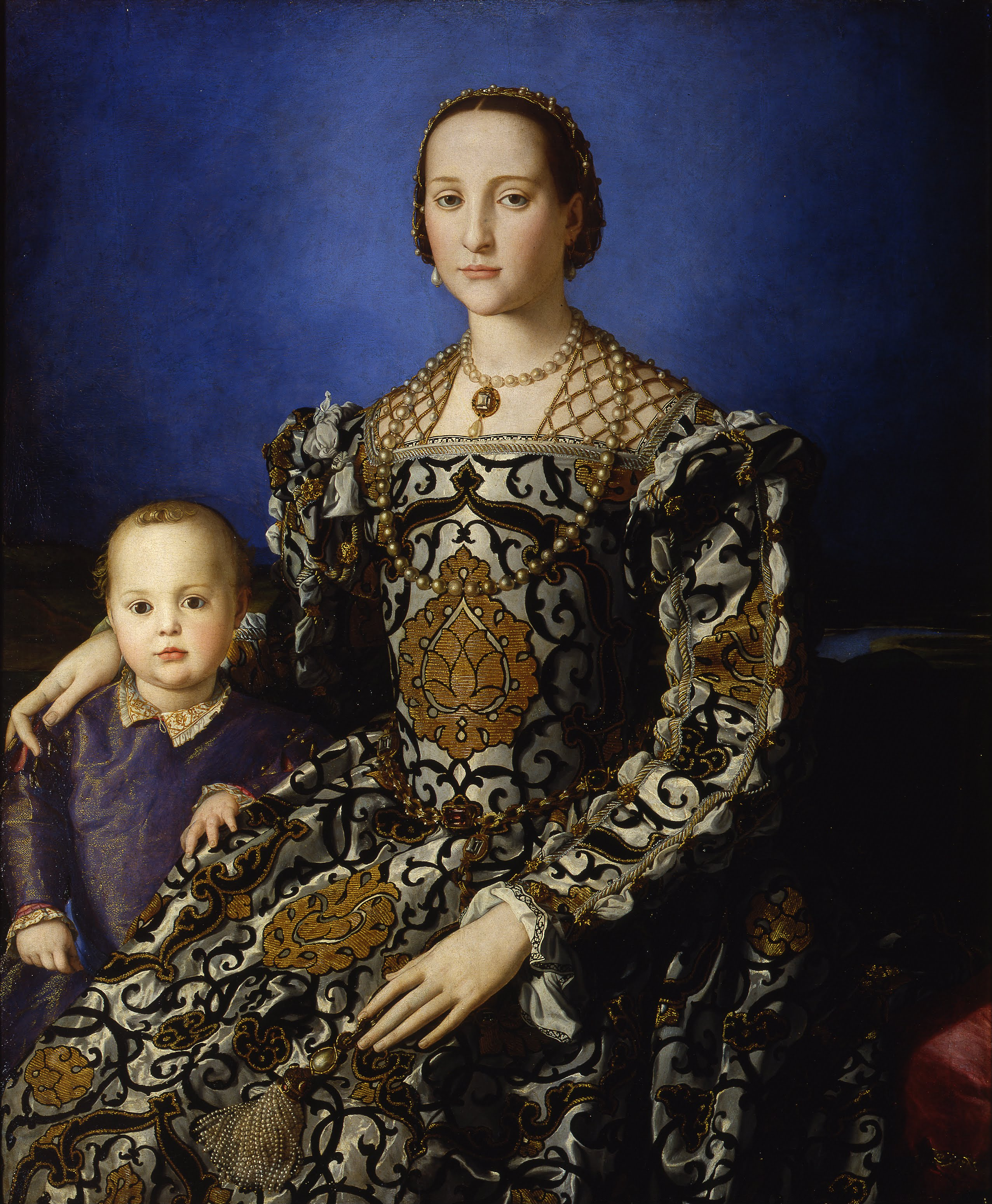
6 – 1545

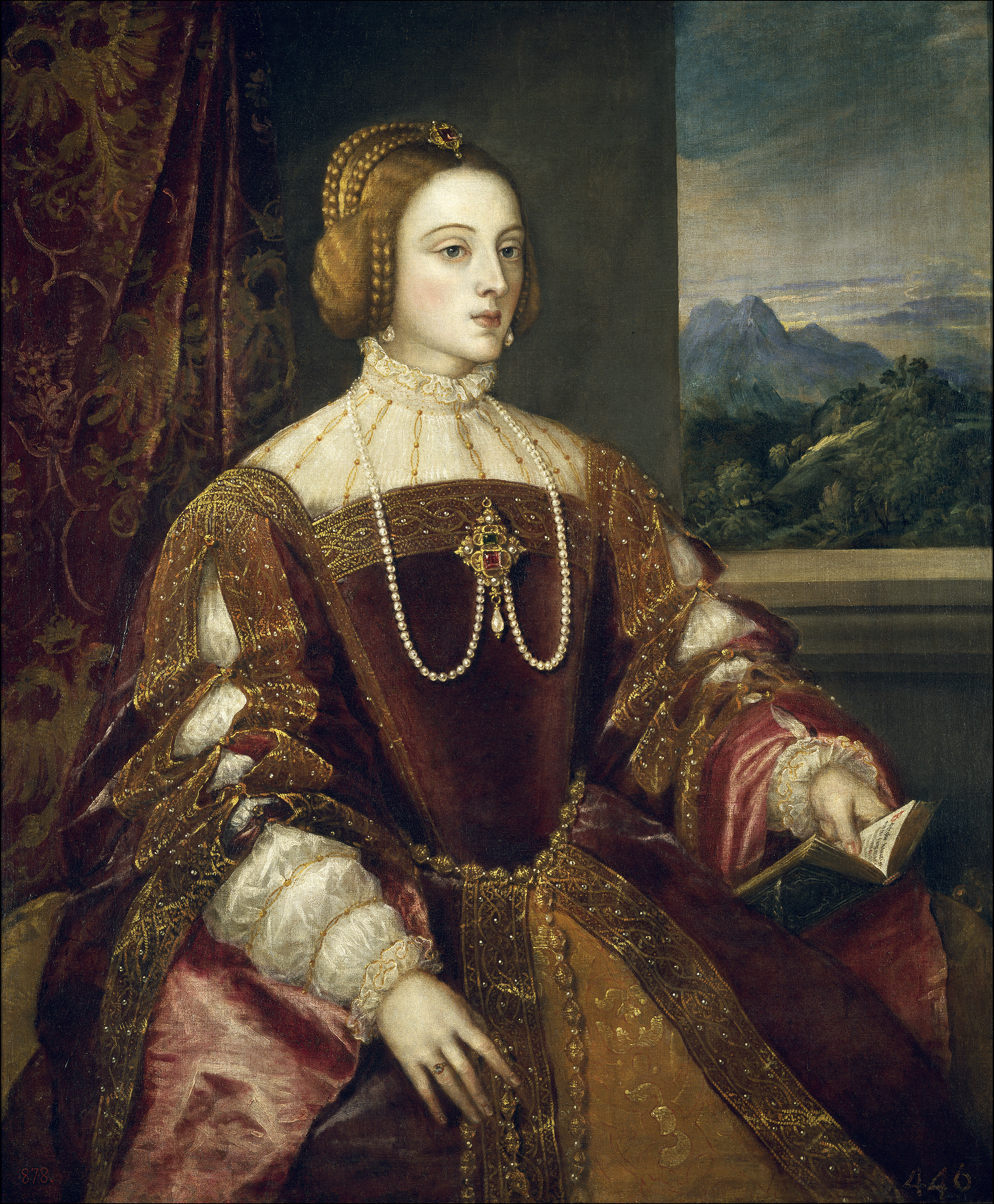
7 – 1548
1. Eleanor of Austria, Queen of Portugal and France, wears a floral cut velvet gown with fur-lined oversleeves over full, striped slashed undersleeves caught up with jewels, 1530.
2. Foschi's Italian Lady wears a pink gown with puffed upper sleeves and contrasting velvet lower sleeves, both trimmed with fur. She wears a high-necked chemise (or possibly partlet) trimmed with blackwork embroidery at the neck and front opening. Her girdle of knotted cord has a tassel at the end, 1530–35.
3. Titian's Italian Lady wears a gown with puffed upper sleeves over contrasting slashed lower or undersleeves. She wears a jeweled girdle at her natural waist. Her hair is done up in intricately knotted braids, 1536.
4. Eleonora Gonzaga wears a black gown with puffed upper sleeves. A "flea fur" with jeweled gold face is suspended from her knotted and tasselled girdle. She wears a partlet with a high collar and small ruff, and her hair is confined in a black cap, 1538.
5. Lucrezia Panciatichi wears a rose gown with intricately ruched or gathered puffed upper sleeves. The tight gathers of her skirt can be seen at the front waist, 1540.
6. Eleanora of Toledo, wife of Cosimo de' Medici, wears a gown of a boldly patterned silk with matching sleeves. She wears a gold lattice-work partlet studded with pearls and a matching snood or caul. The blackwork embroidery at the edges of her square-necked chemise can be seen beneath the parlet, 1545.
7. Empress and Queen of Spain Isabella of Portugal wears a gown with wide bands of trim. Her bodice is slightly arched over the breast and slightly pointed at the waist, and her long, wide sleeves are open down the front and caught together with jeweled clasps or pins. She wears a high-neck partlet with a small ruff, 1548.

=== Style gallery – England and France 1500s–1520s ===
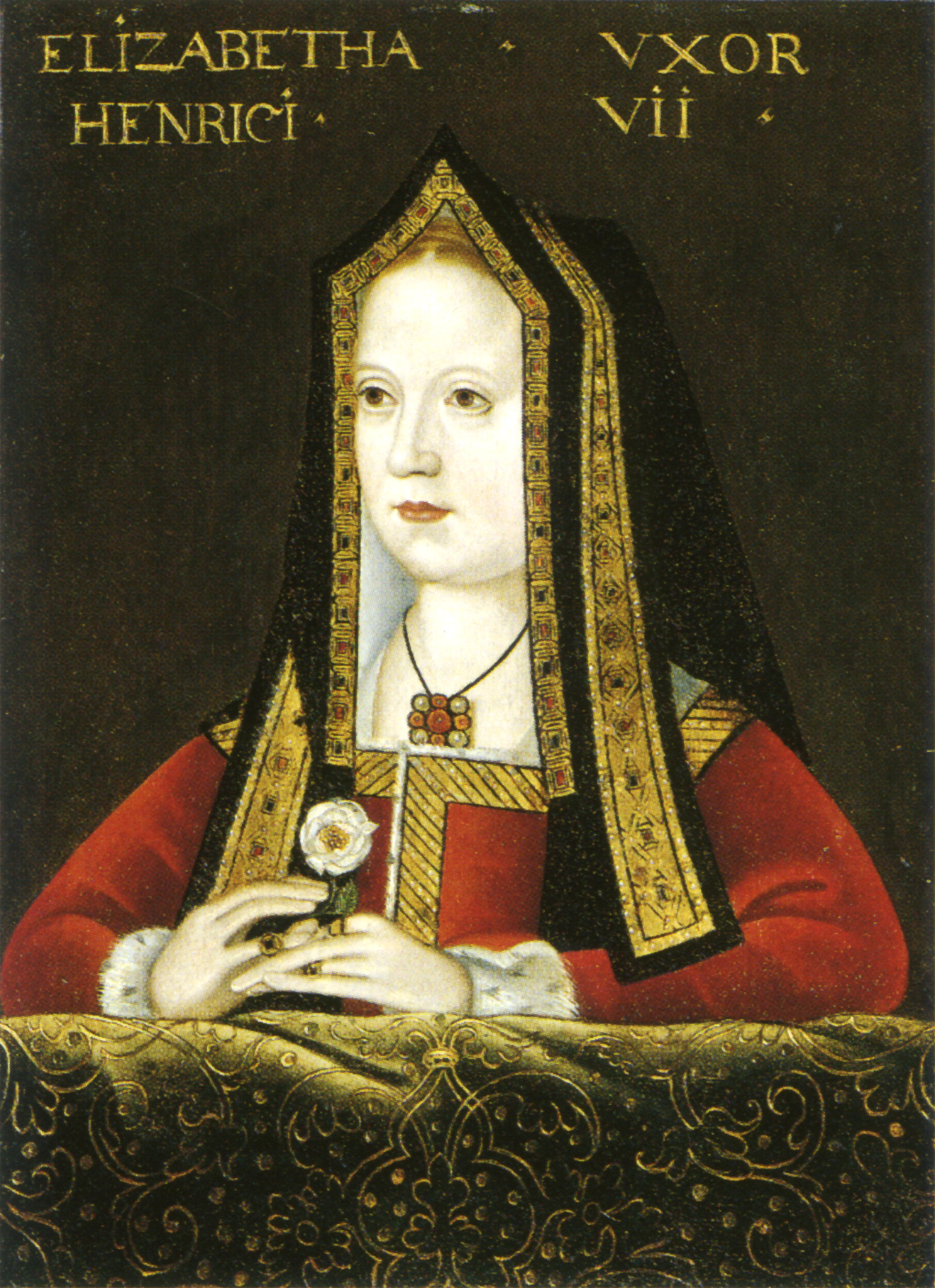
1 – c. 1500

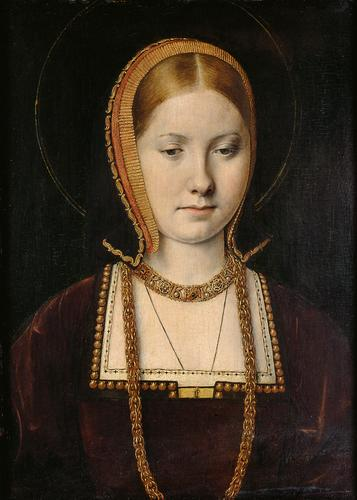
2 – early C. 16

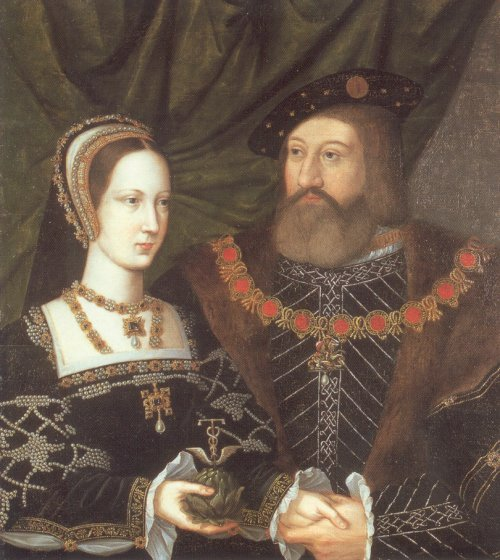
3 – c. 1516

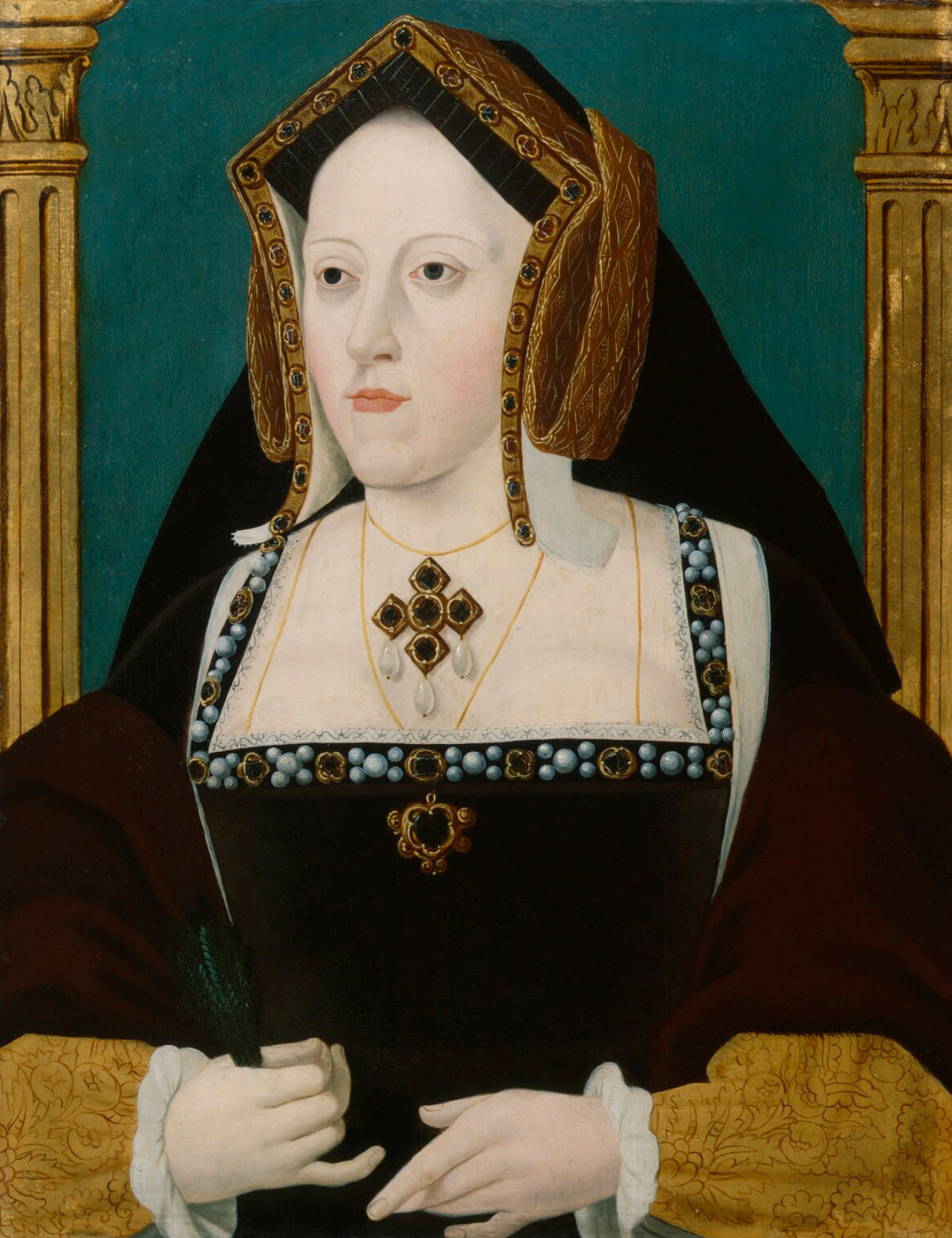
4 – painted in 18th century depicting c. 1525

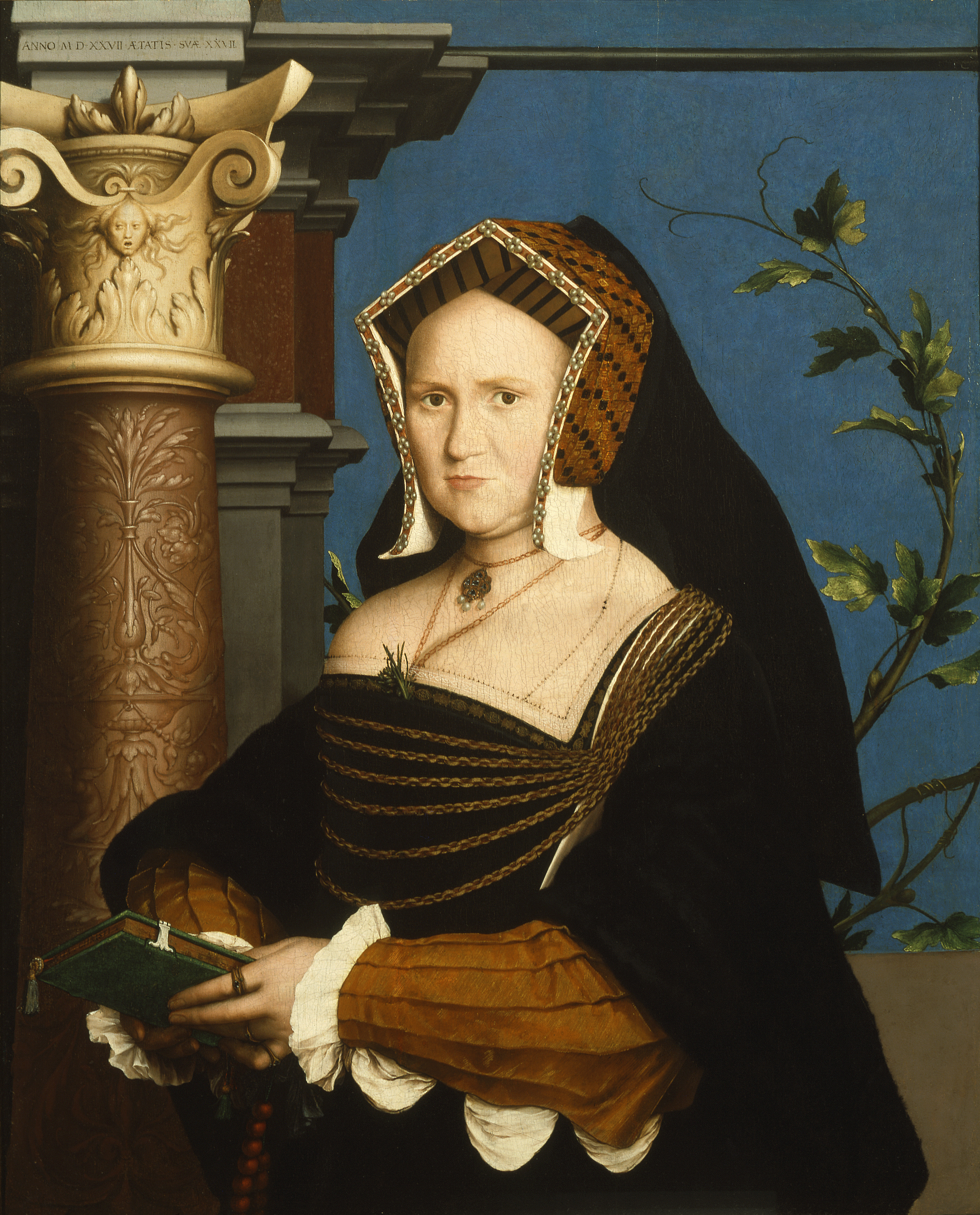
5 – 1527

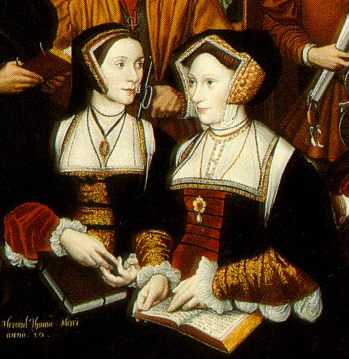
6 – 1527–28

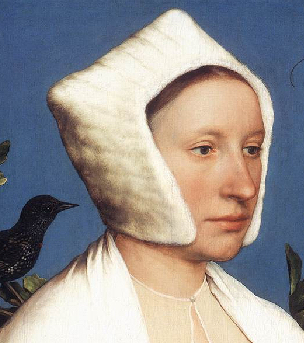
7 – 1527–28

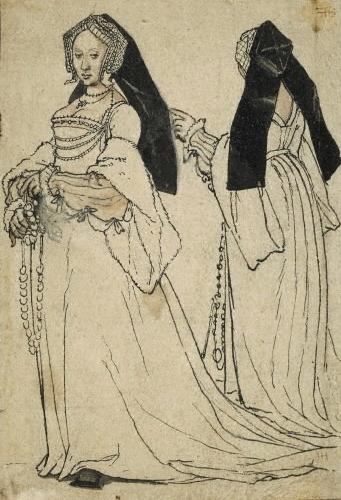
8 – 1528–30
1. Elizabeth of York wears an early gable hood and a front-closing red gown with a fur lining or trim and fur cuffs, c. 1500.
2. An unidentified princess believed to be Mary Tudor or Catherine of Aragon wears a round hood over a linen cap and a dark gown over a kirtle. Her square-necked smock has a narrow row of embroidery at the neck, and she wears a jewelled collar or carcanet and a long, heavy gold chain. If it is Catherine, the portrait was probably painted in 1502-1504.
3. Henry VIII's sister Mary Tudor's marriage portrait (with Charles Brandon) in a French gown shows the cuffs of her sleeves turned back to display a lining decorated with pearls. She wears a French hood. Her undersleeves have an open seam caught with jewelled clasps or pins and her chemise sleeves are pulled through the openings in small puffs, 1516.
4. Catherine of Aragon, c. 1525, wears a gable hood with the lappets folded up and pinned in place, and the veil hanging loosely in back. Her gown has a pattern of jewels at the neckline, and her wide sleeves are turned up to show the lining.
5. Mary Wotton, Lady Guildenford wears a gable hood with a loose veil. The bodice of her gown (presumably laced at the side-back or back) is decorated with draped chains, and her smock sleeves are pulled through the open outer seam of her undersleeves in neat puffs, 1527.
6. Two ladies of Thomas More's family wear dark gowns laced over colored kirtles with contrasting undersleeves. 1527–28.
7. Holbein's Anne Lovell wears a fur cap shaped like a gable hood. She wears a linen kerchief or capelet draped over her shoulders, and a sheer parlet, 1527–28.
8. Drawing by Holbein shows front and back views of English dresses and gable hood of 1528–30.

=== Style gallery – England 1530s–1540s ===
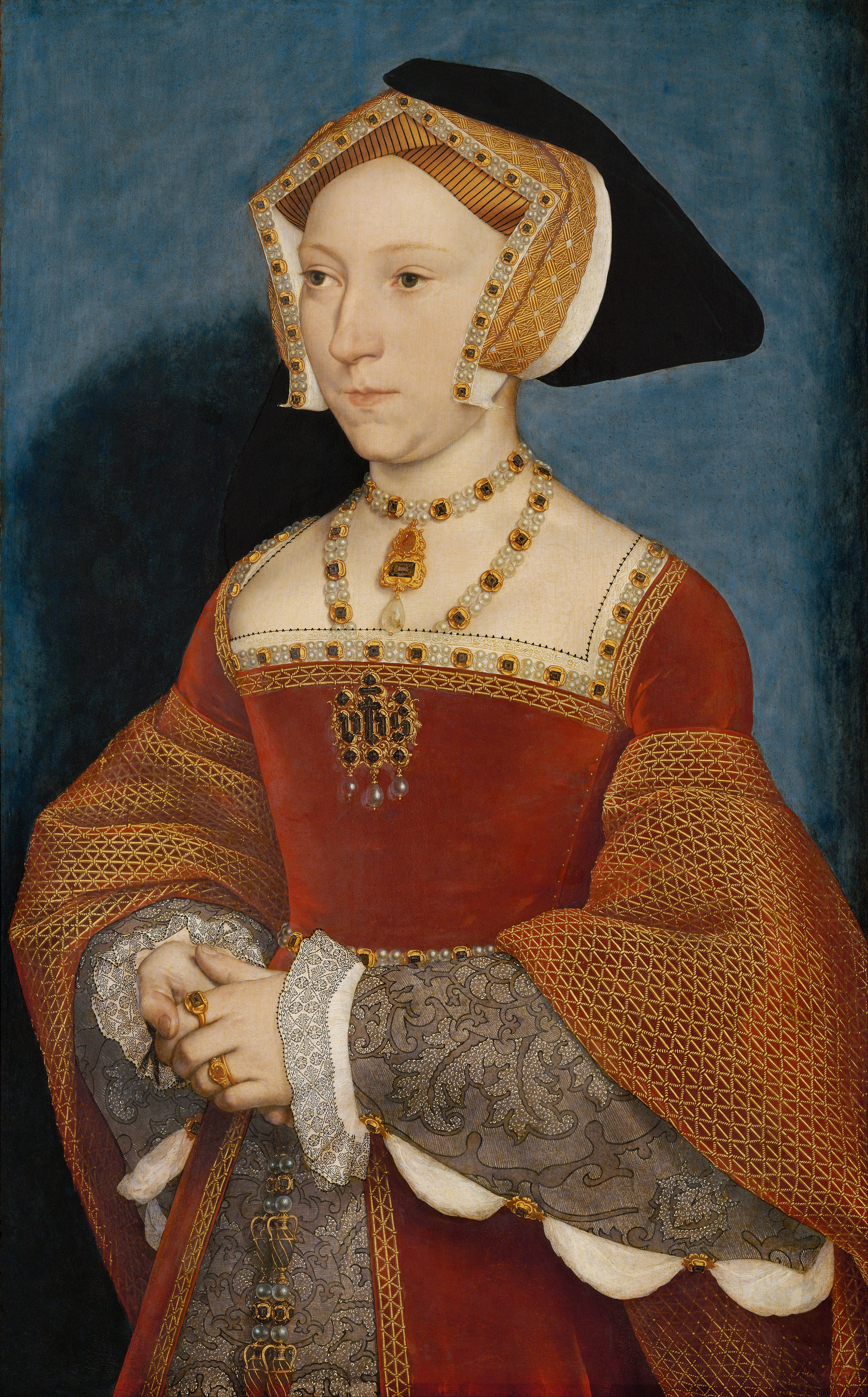
1 – 1536–37

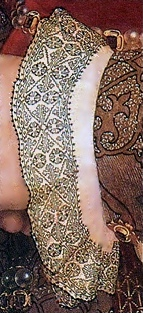
2 – 1536–37

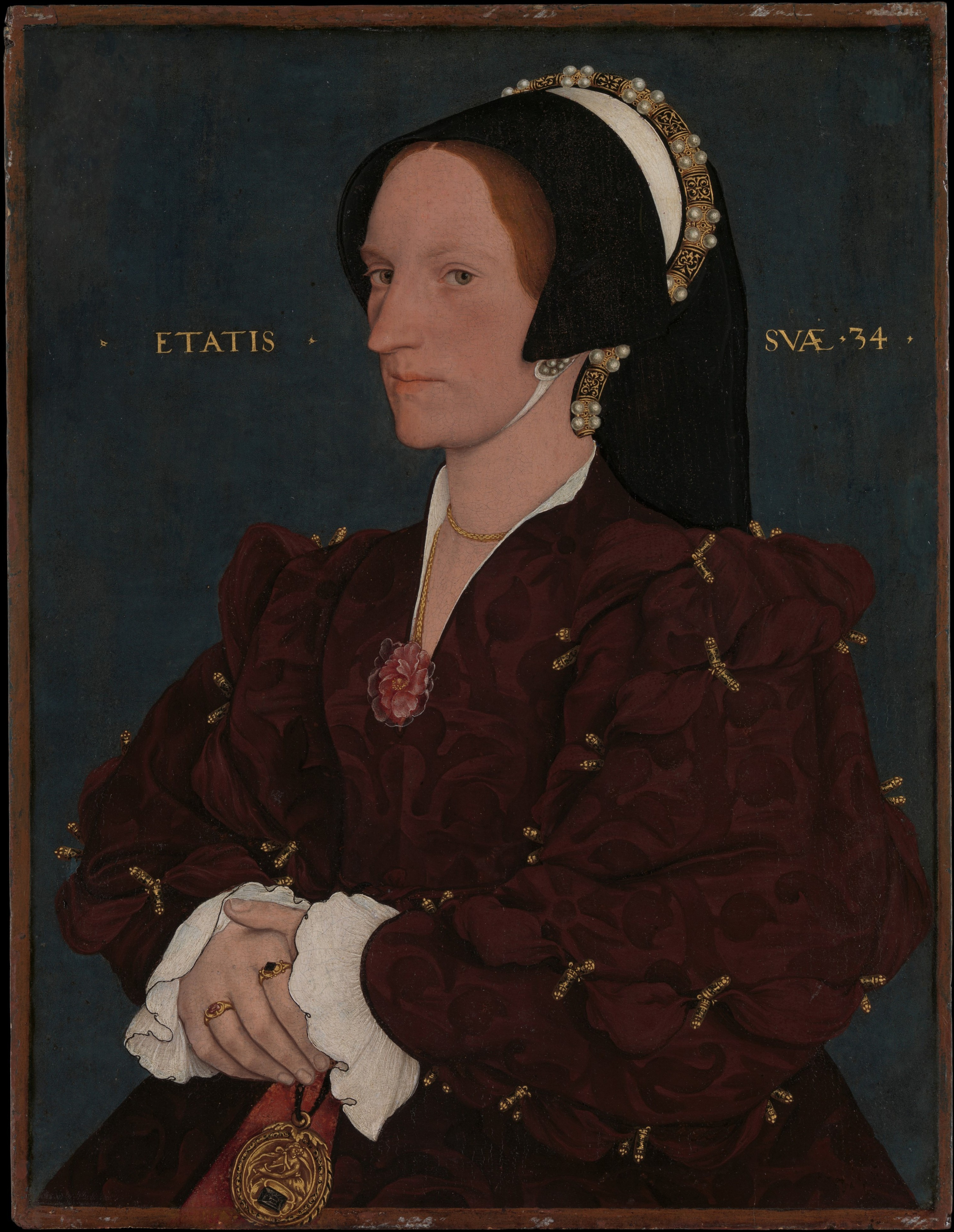
3 – 1535–40

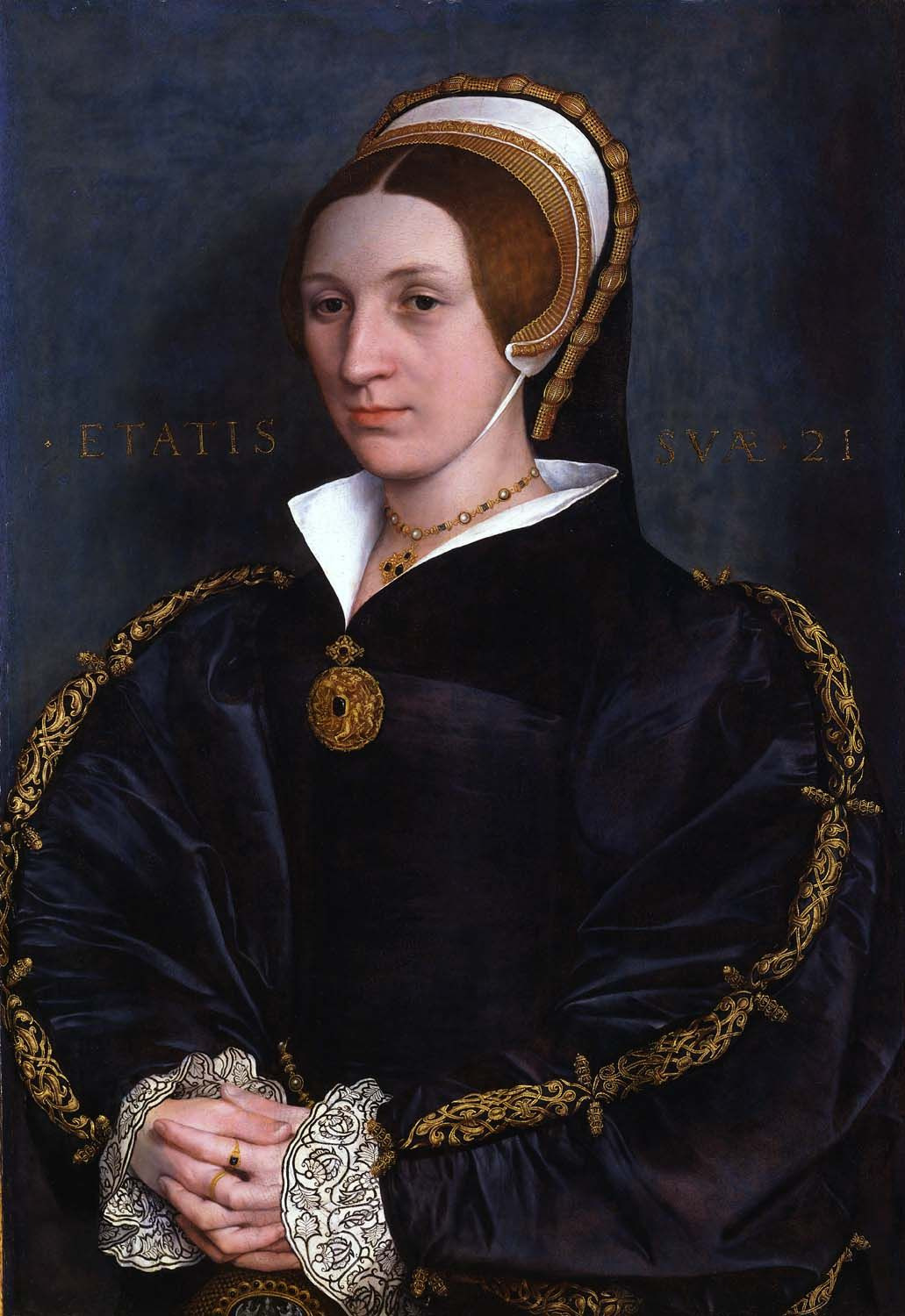
4 – 1540–41

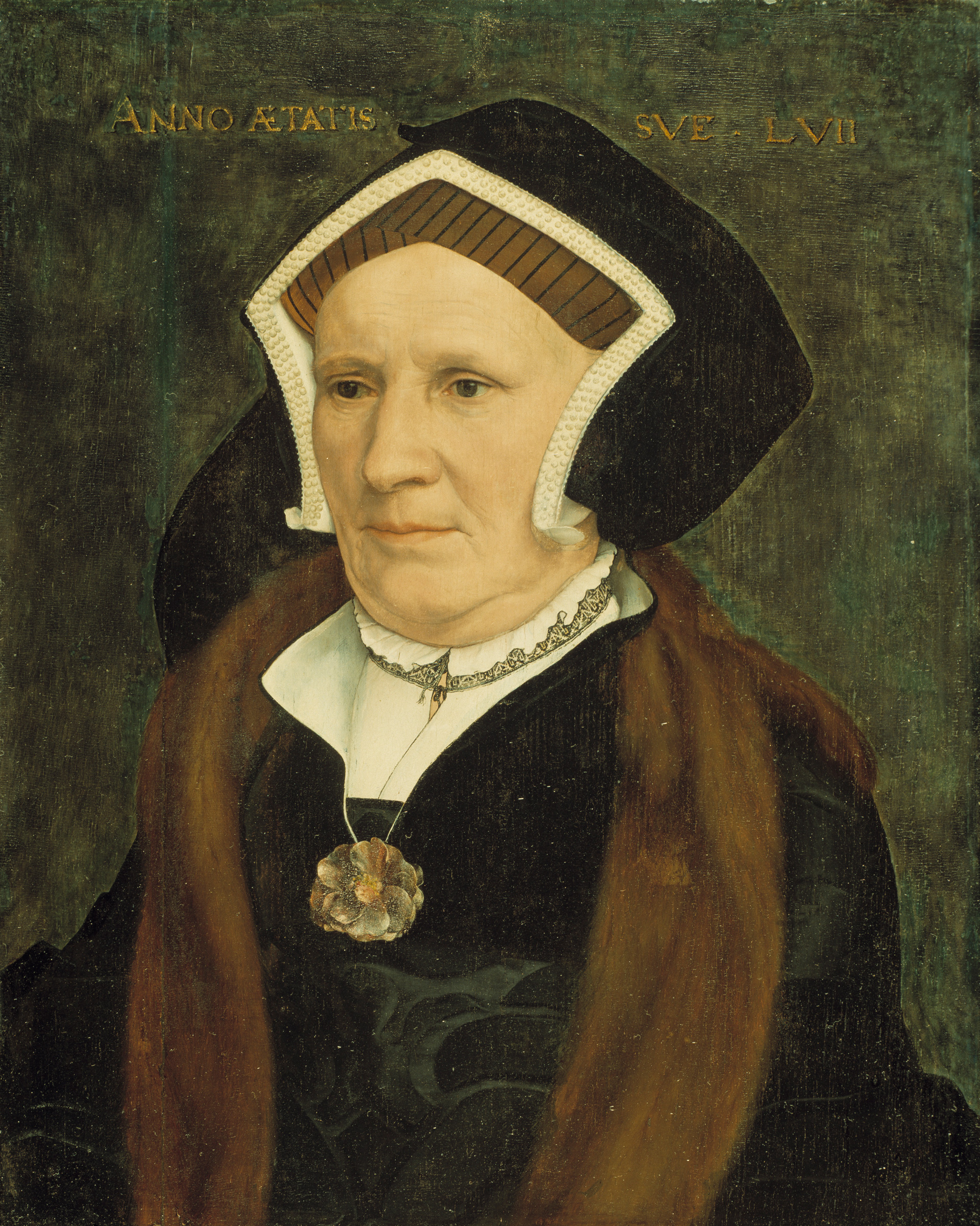
5 – 1543

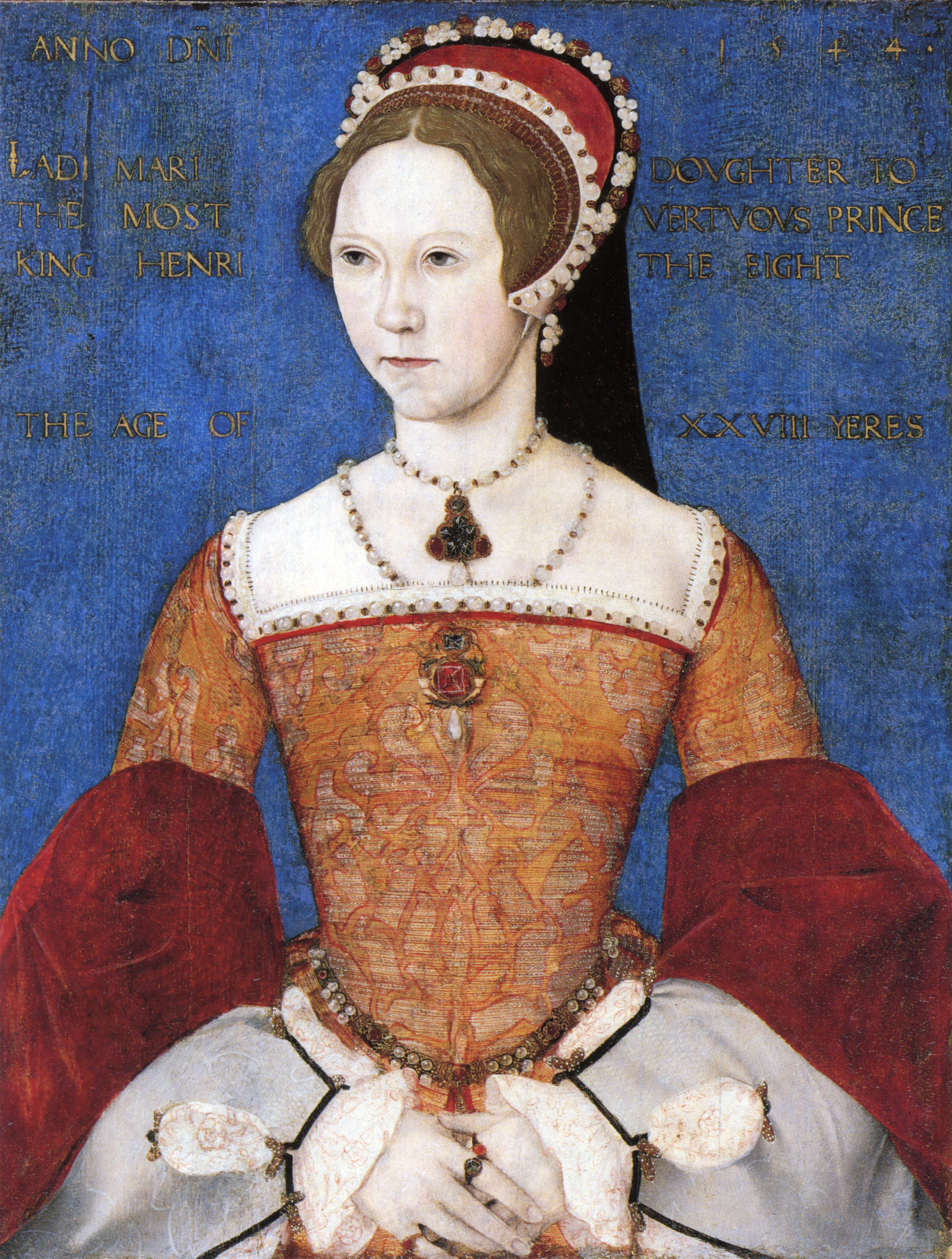
6 – 1544

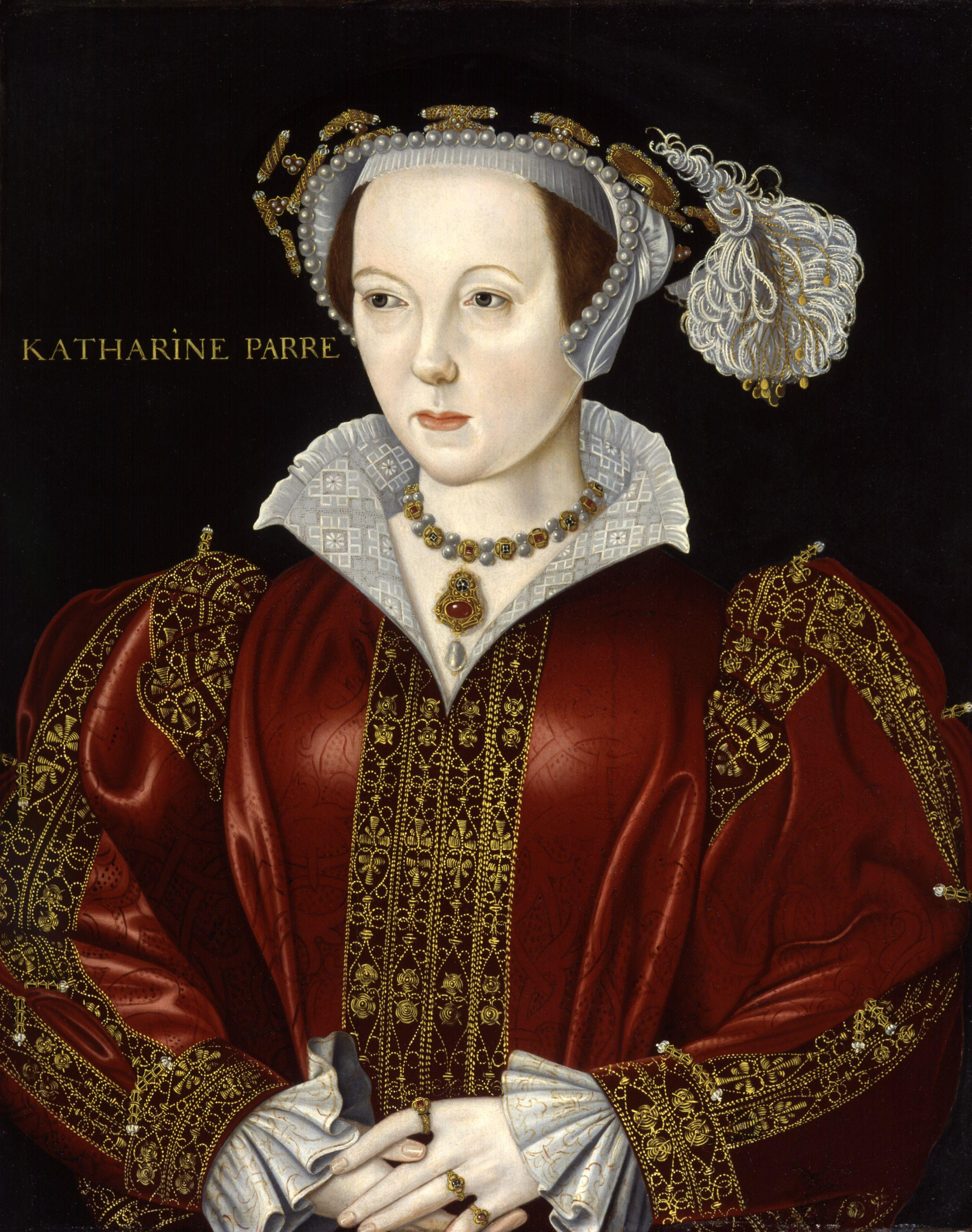
7 – c. 1545

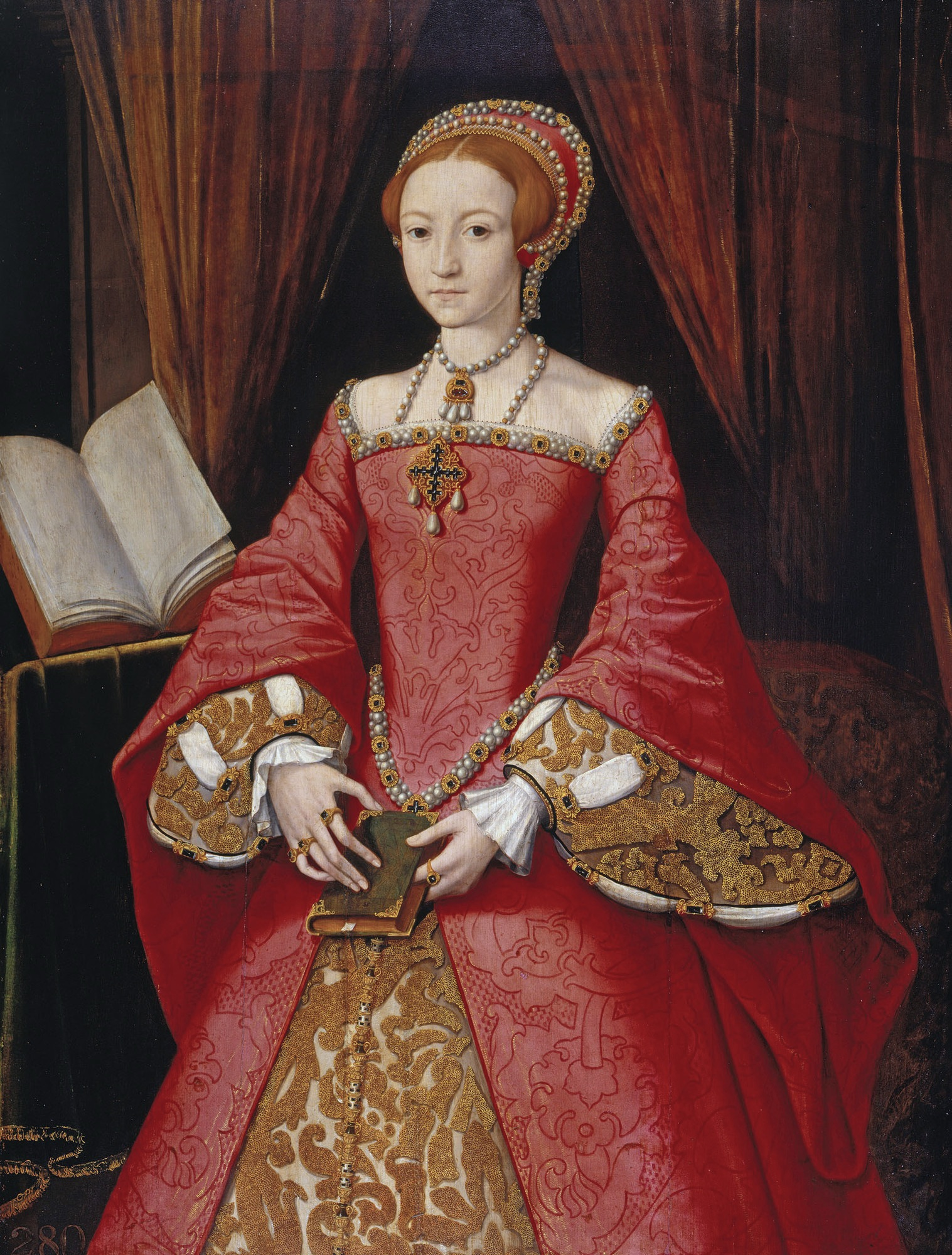
8 – 1546
1. Jane Seymour wears a gable hood and a chemise with geometric blackwork embroidery, 1536–37.
2. Detail of the embroidery on Jane Seymour's cuff.
3. Margaret Wyatt, Lady Lee wears a patterned brown or mulberry-colored gown with full sleeves and a matching partlet lined in white, 1540 (perhaps after an earlier drawing).
4. Elizabeth Seymour wears a black satin gown with full sleeves and black velvet partlet. Her cuffs have floral blackwork embroidery, 1540–41.
5. Lady Margaret Butts wears a high-necked chemise with a band of blackwork at the neck. The lappets on her gable hood are solid black, and she has a fur piece draped around her shoulders, 1543.
6. Henry VIII's daughter Mary Tudor wears a brocade gown with red sleeve linings and a red French hood with a black veil. The edge of her square-necked chemise is visible above the neckline of her dress, 1544.
7. Catherine Parr wears a red loose gown with wide bands of applied trim. She wears a white cap with pearls and a pleated forehead cloth under a hat with an upturned brim and a feather. The collar of her gown is lined with patterned (woven or possibly embroidered) silk, c. 1545.
8. Elizabeth Tudor at age 13 wears a rose-colored gown over a forepart and undersleeves of cloth of silver with patterns in looped pile. Her French hood matches her gown, 1546.

== Men's fashion ==
=== Overview ===
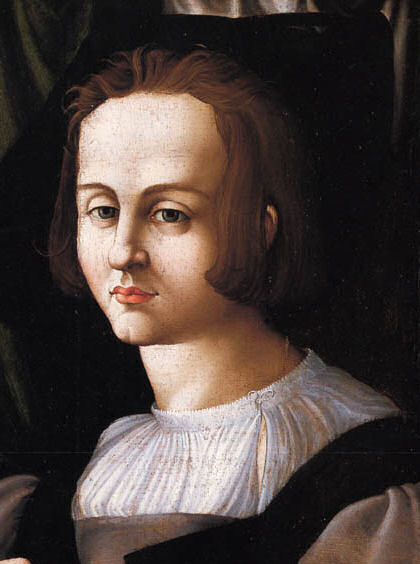
Fastening of an Italian chemise, c. 1525

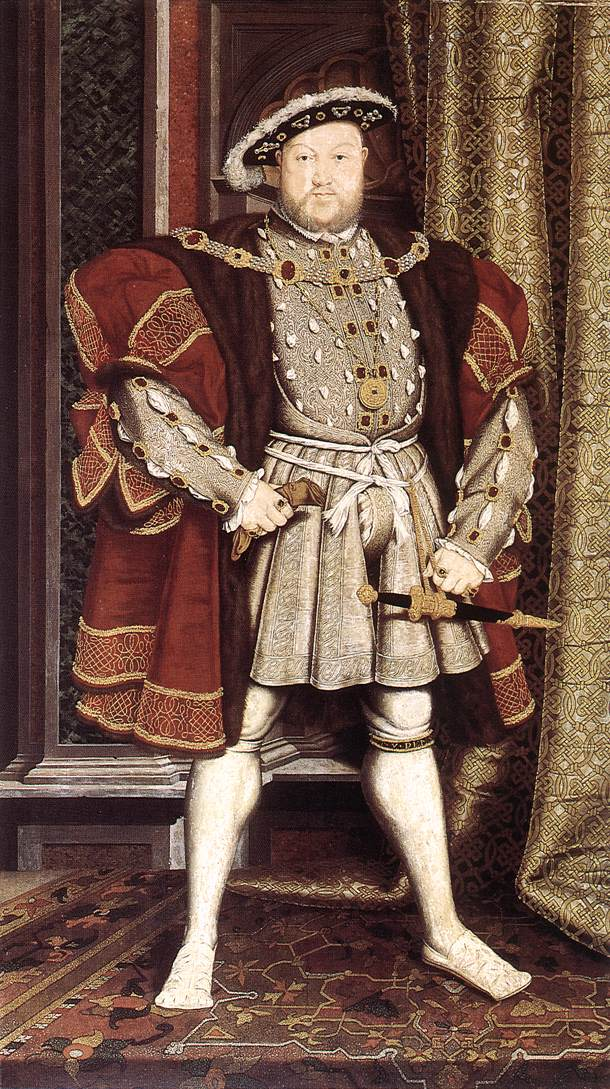
Henry VIII wears a fur-trimmed red overgown with split hanging sleeves over a jerkin and an embroidered and slashed doublet and sleeves. Hans Holbein the Younger, 1537

Early in this period, men's silhouette was long and narrow, but gradually it grew wider until by the later reign of Henry the VIII the silhouette was almost square, with shoulder emphasis achieved through wide revers and collars and large sleeves.

Throughout this period, fashionable men's clothing consisted of:

- A linen shirt or chemise, originally low-necked but with a higher neckline by mid-century. The neckline was gathered into a narrow band or adjusted by means of a drawstring; the tiny ruffle formed by pulling up the drawstring became wider over time, and then evolved into the ruff of the next period.
- A doublet with matching sleeves, often slashed or cut to allow the fabric of the shirt beneath to show through.
- A jerkin, usually cut low to the waist in front to reveal the doublet beneath, with full skirts to the knee.
- Hose, now usually ending above the knee, with a prominent codpiece (both sometimes hidden under the skirts of the jerkin).
- Separate nether-hose or stockings held up with garters.
- A front-opening overgown, often fur-lined for warmth and slashed, with sleeves. The overgown was ankle length early in the period, but knee-length overgowns were fashionable in the 1530s and 1540s. Scholars, judges, doctors, and other professionals retained the ankle length gown throughout the period.

From the 1530s, a narrower silhouette became popular under Spanish influence. Collars were higher and tighter. Shoulders lost their padding and developed a slight slope. Doublet sleeves became fuller rather than tight. Jerkins closed to the neck; their skirts were shorter and slightly flared rather than full, and they displayed more of the hose. Overall the fashion was more rigid and restrained.

Lower-class men wore a one-piece garment called a cotte in English, tight to the waist with knee-length skirts and long sleeves over their hose.

Bright colors (reds, yellows, purples, pinks, and greens) were popular.

Matthäus Schwarz compiled a Klaidungsbüchlein or Trachtenbuch (usually translated as "Book of Clothes"), a book cataloguing the clothing that he wore between 1520 and 1560. The book contains color illustrations focused on Schwarz's individual clothing history.

=== Hairstyles and headgear ===
A variety of hats were worn in the period. The German barett, with its turned-up brim, was fashionable throughout the period, and a similar hat with a turned-up round or "halo" brim was popular in the court of Henry VIII. The flat hat combined a low, gathered crown with a circular brim and was worn in mid-century.

At the beginning of the century, hair was often grown chin-length with the exception of the clergy. Styles gradually became shorter and more finely trimmed over the 1510s and 1520s until by the 1530s short styles were favoured.

=== Style gallery 1500–1510 ===
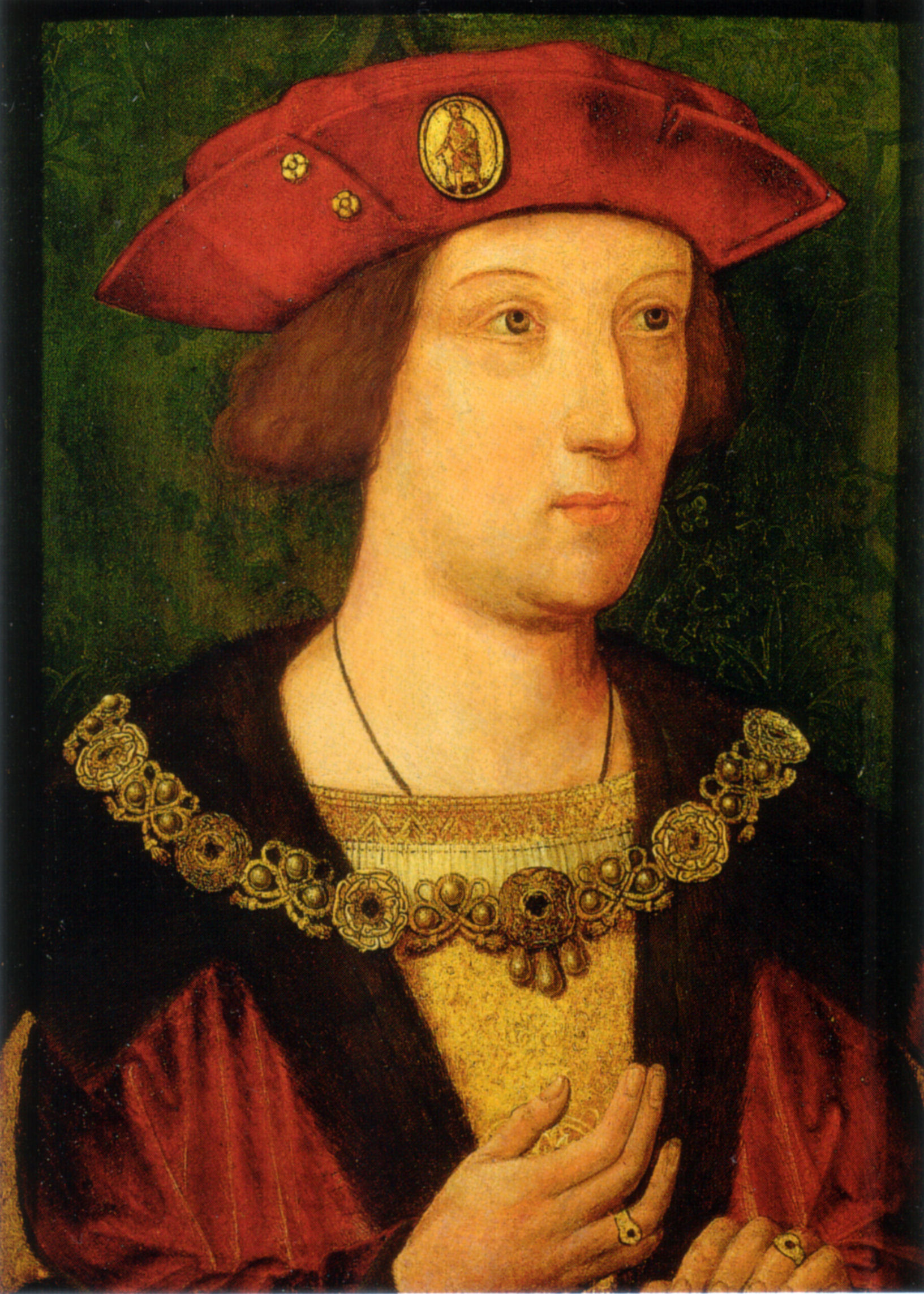
1 – c. 1500

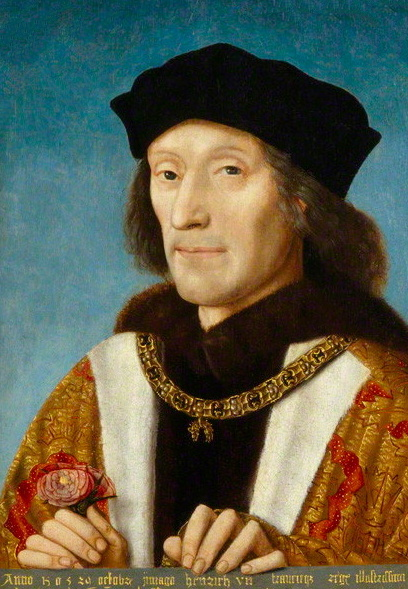
2 – c. 1500

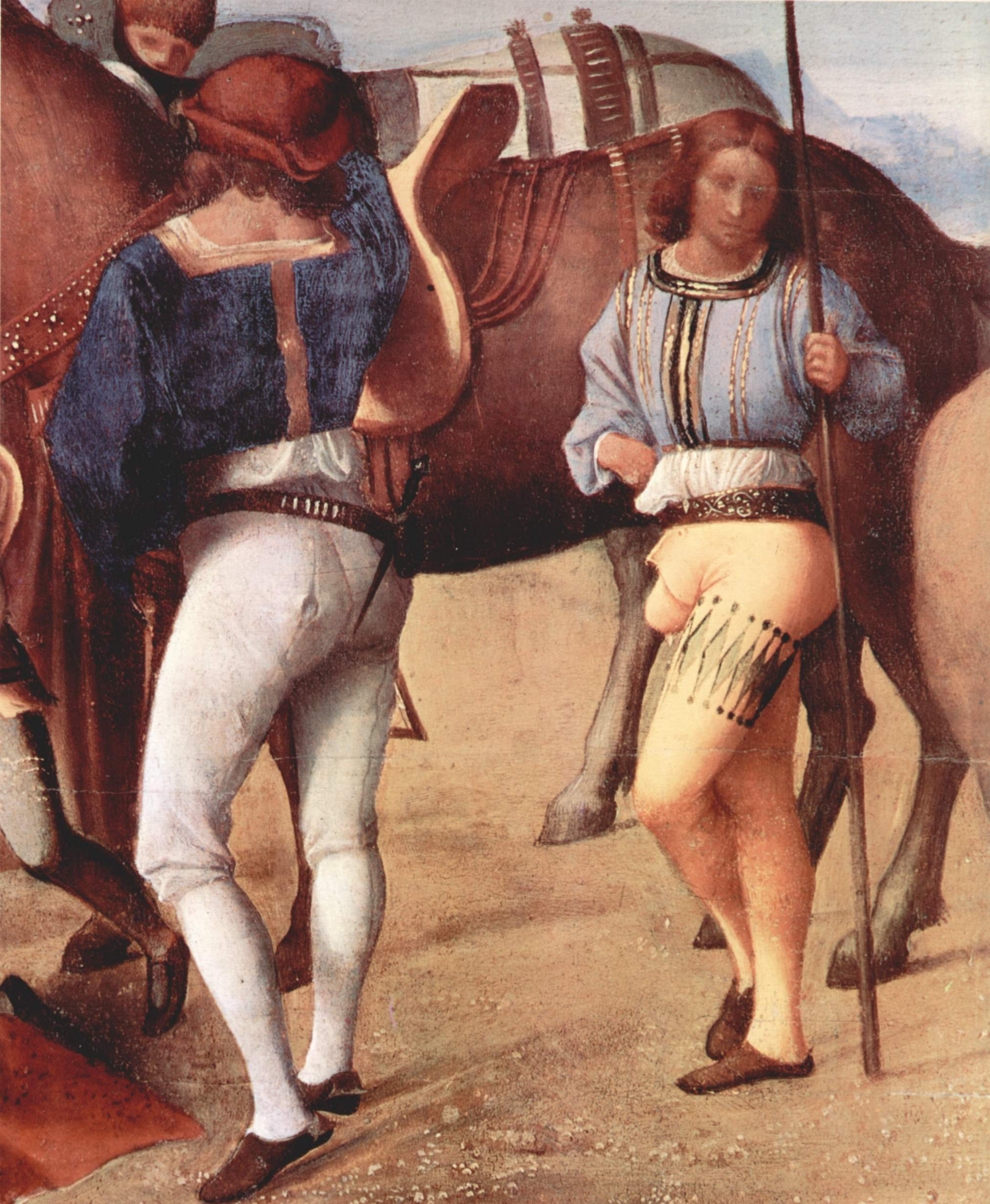
3 – 1500–1510

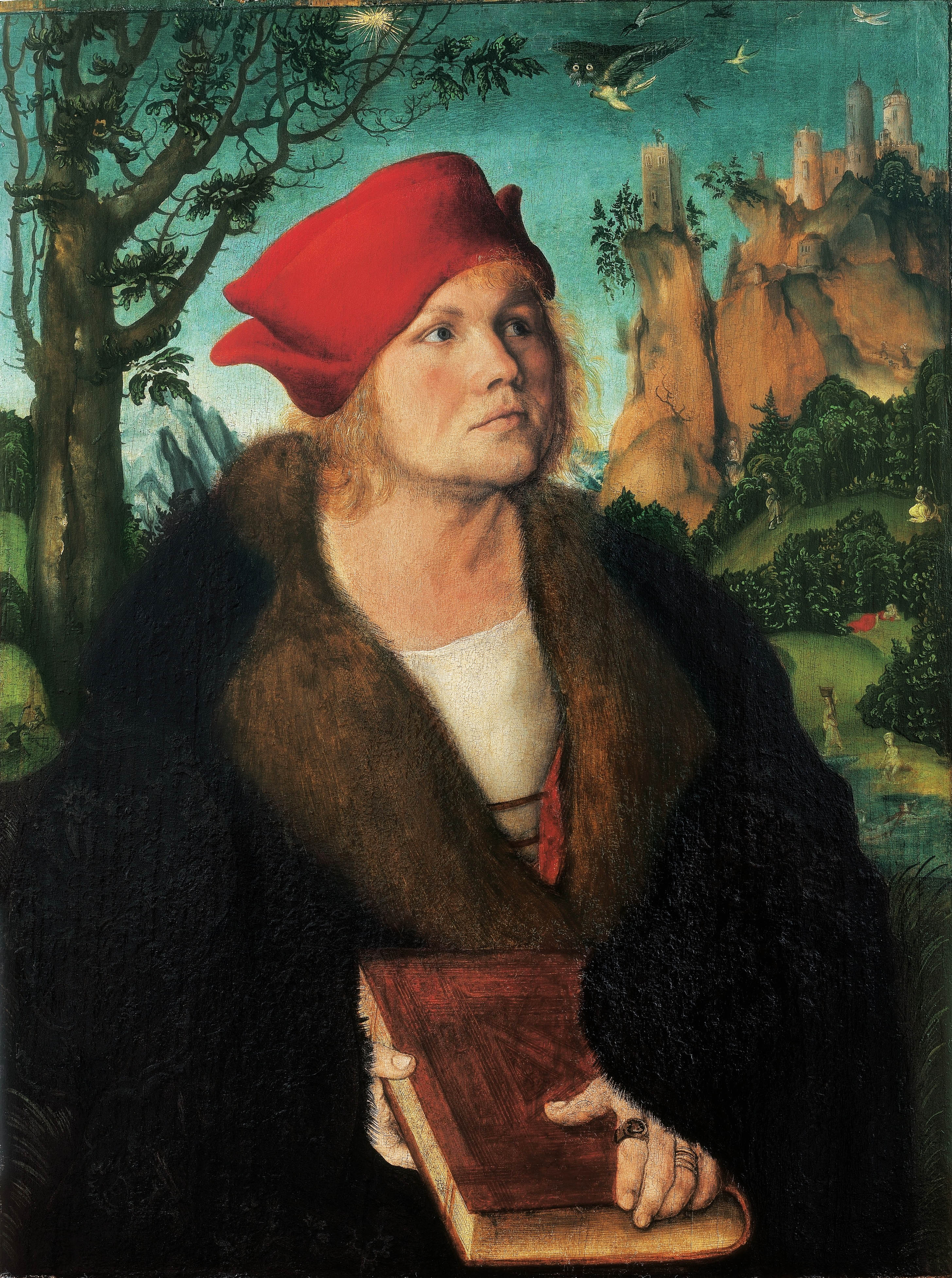
4 – 1502–03

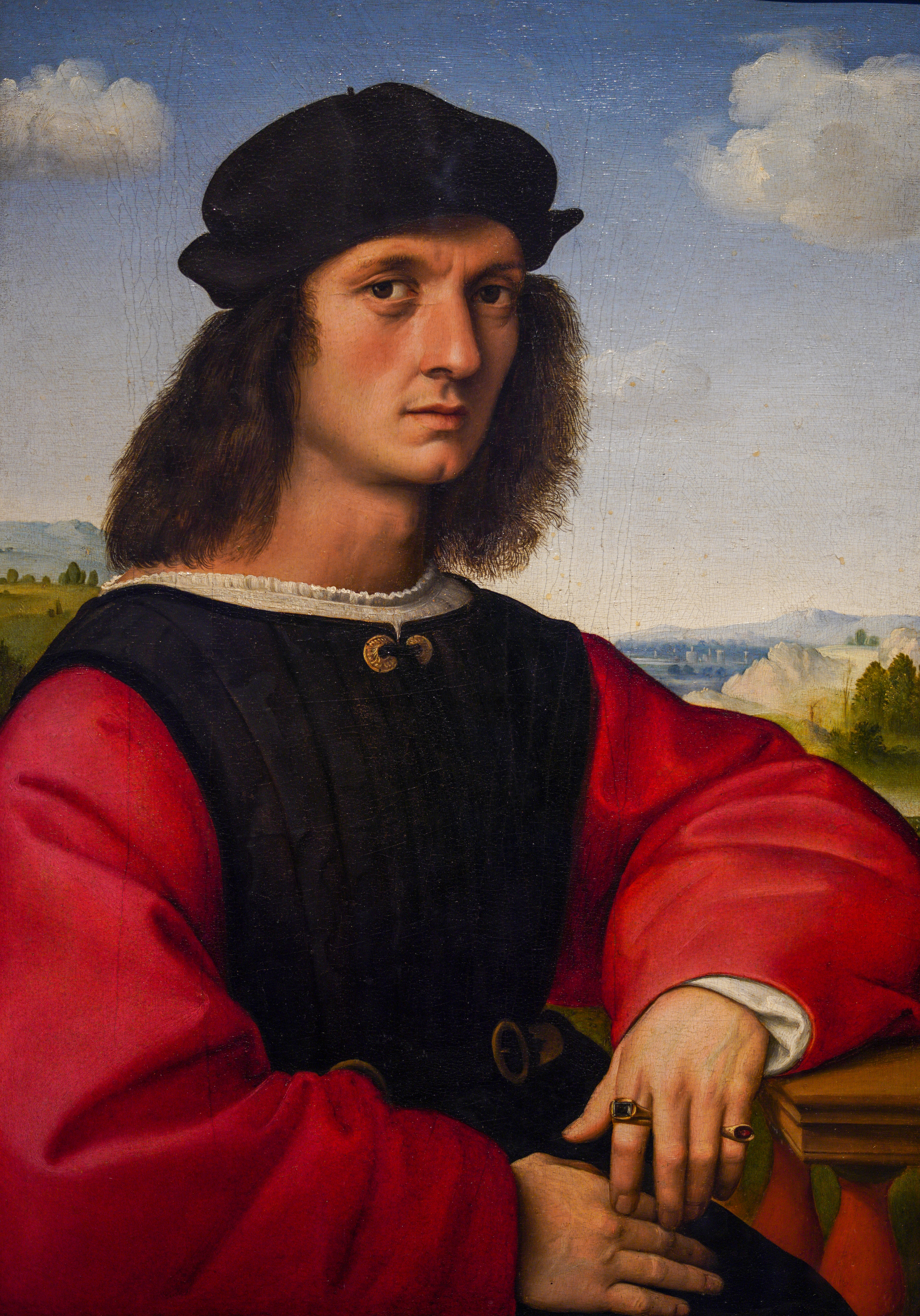
5 – 1506

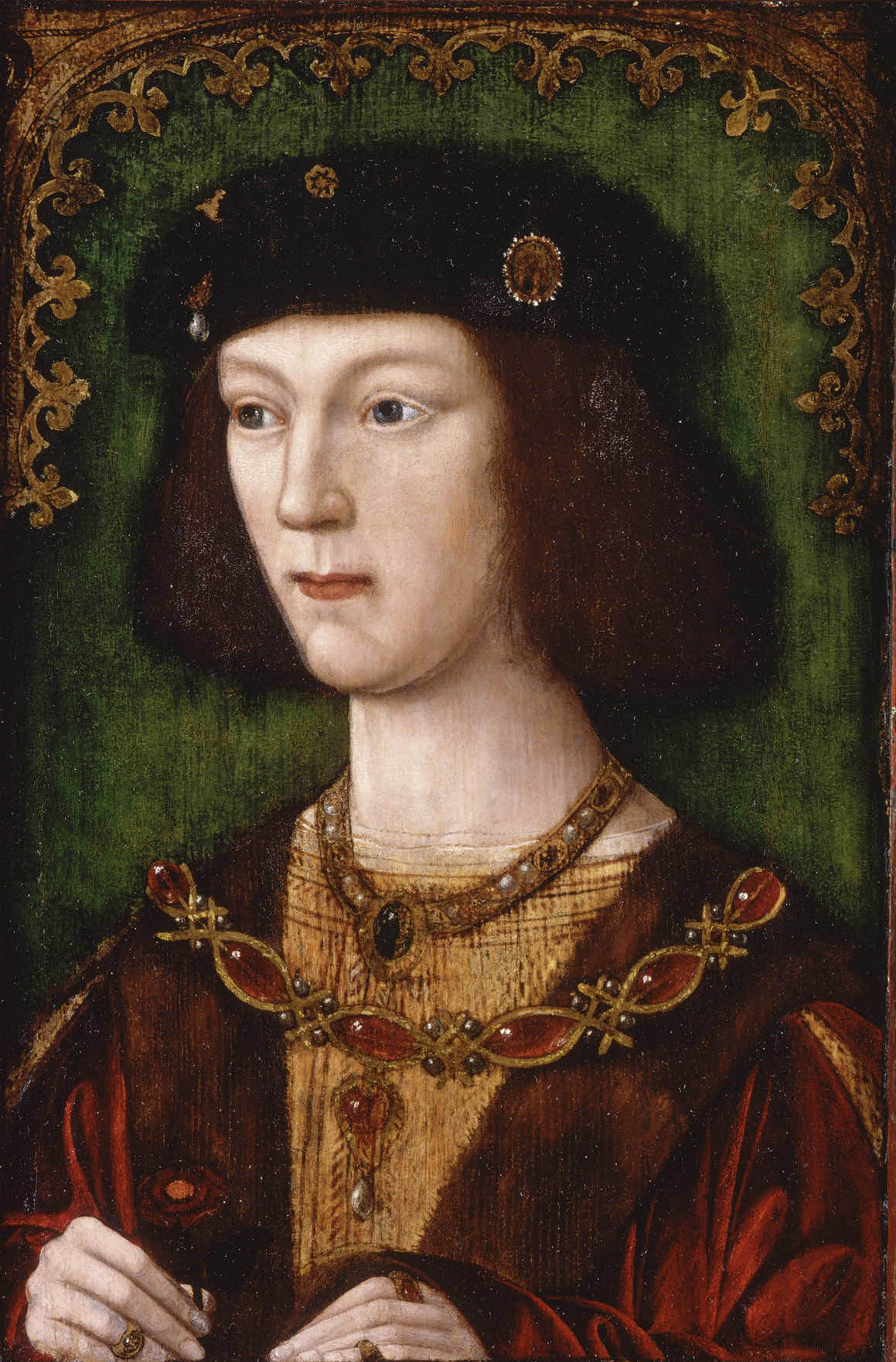
6 – 1509
1. Arthur, Prince of Wales wears a red hat with two gold buttons and a badge. He wears a jewelled collar of knots and Tudor roses over a reddish overgown with dark fur trim, c. 1500.
2. Henry VII wears a red-and-gold brocade overgown over another fur garment. He wears the collar of the Order of the Golden Fleece, c. 1500.
3. Italian hose of the first decade of the century. The man on the left wears hose divided into upper hose and nether hose or stockings. The man on right wears hose slashed around one thigh, with a pouched codpiece, 1500–1510.
4. Johannes Cuspinian wears a fur-lined brocade overgown over a front-laced red doublet and a low-necked shirt or chemise. He wears a red hat with an upturned brim, 1502.
5. Angelo Doni wears Italian fashion: a dark doublet with pink sleeves, loose hair, and a hat with a turned-up brim, 1506.
6. The young Henry VIII's hair is worn chin length. His overgown has wide revers and is worn with a jeweled collar, 1509.

=== Style gallery 1510s ===
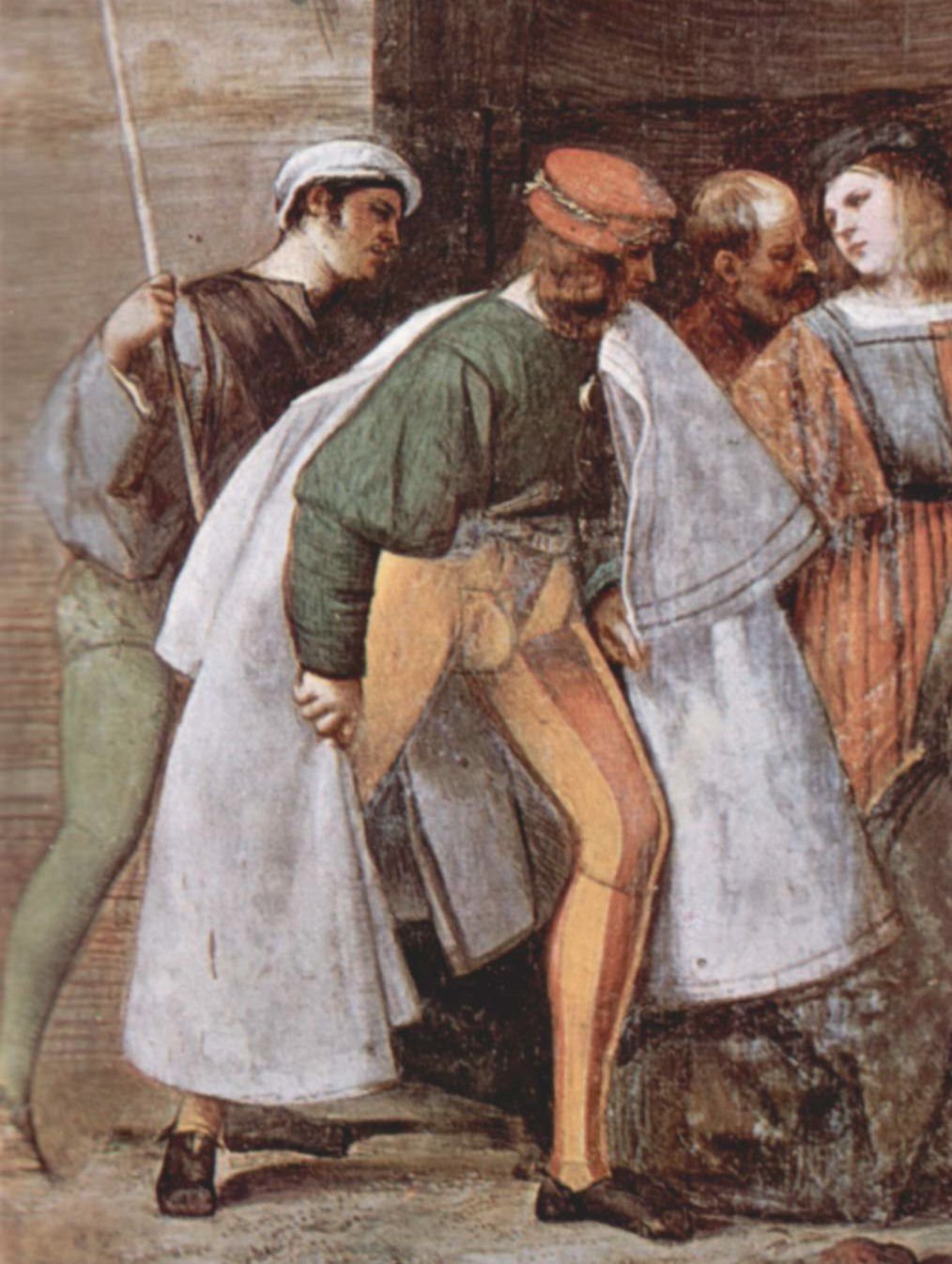
1 – 1510

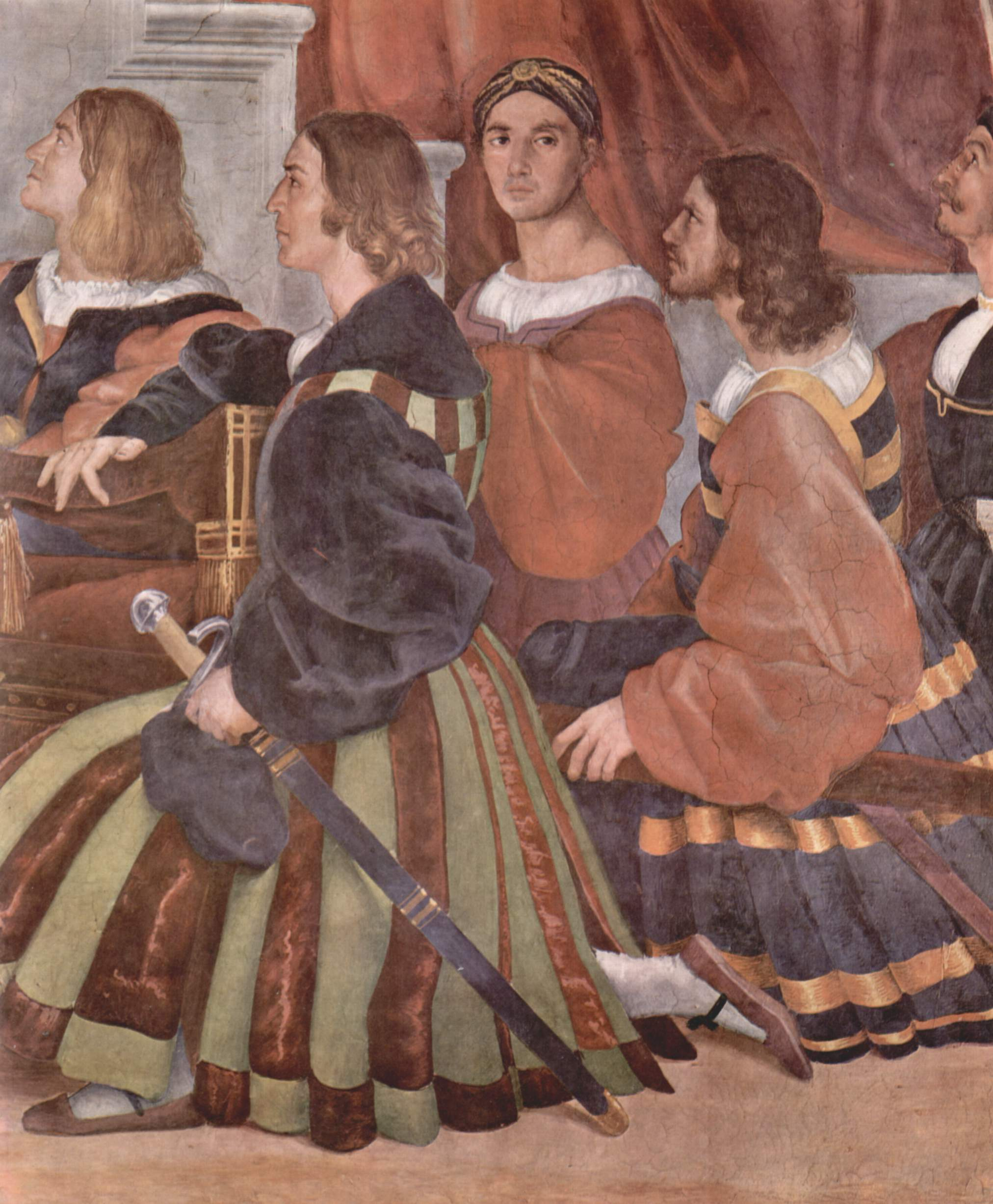
2 – 1512

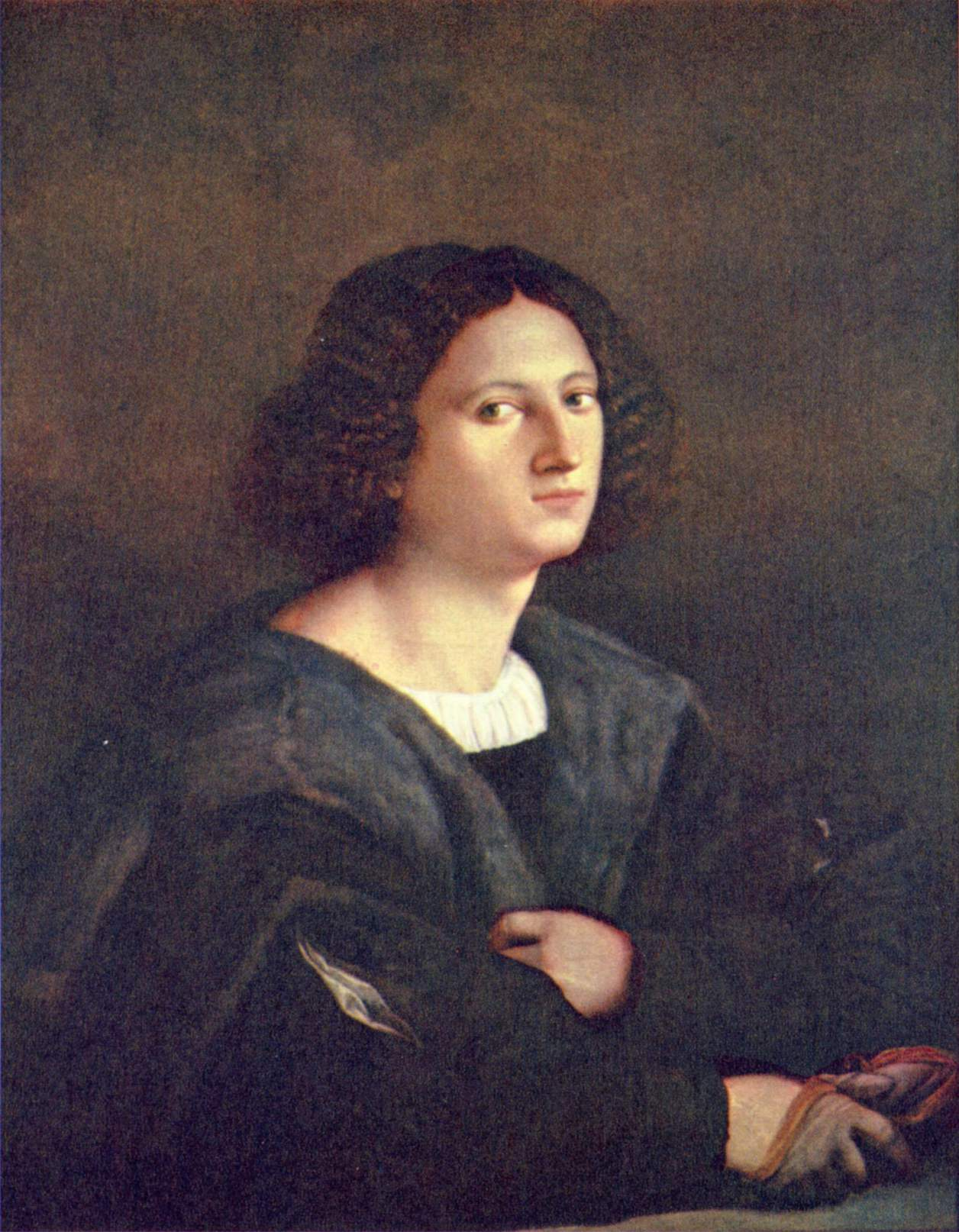
3 – 1512-15

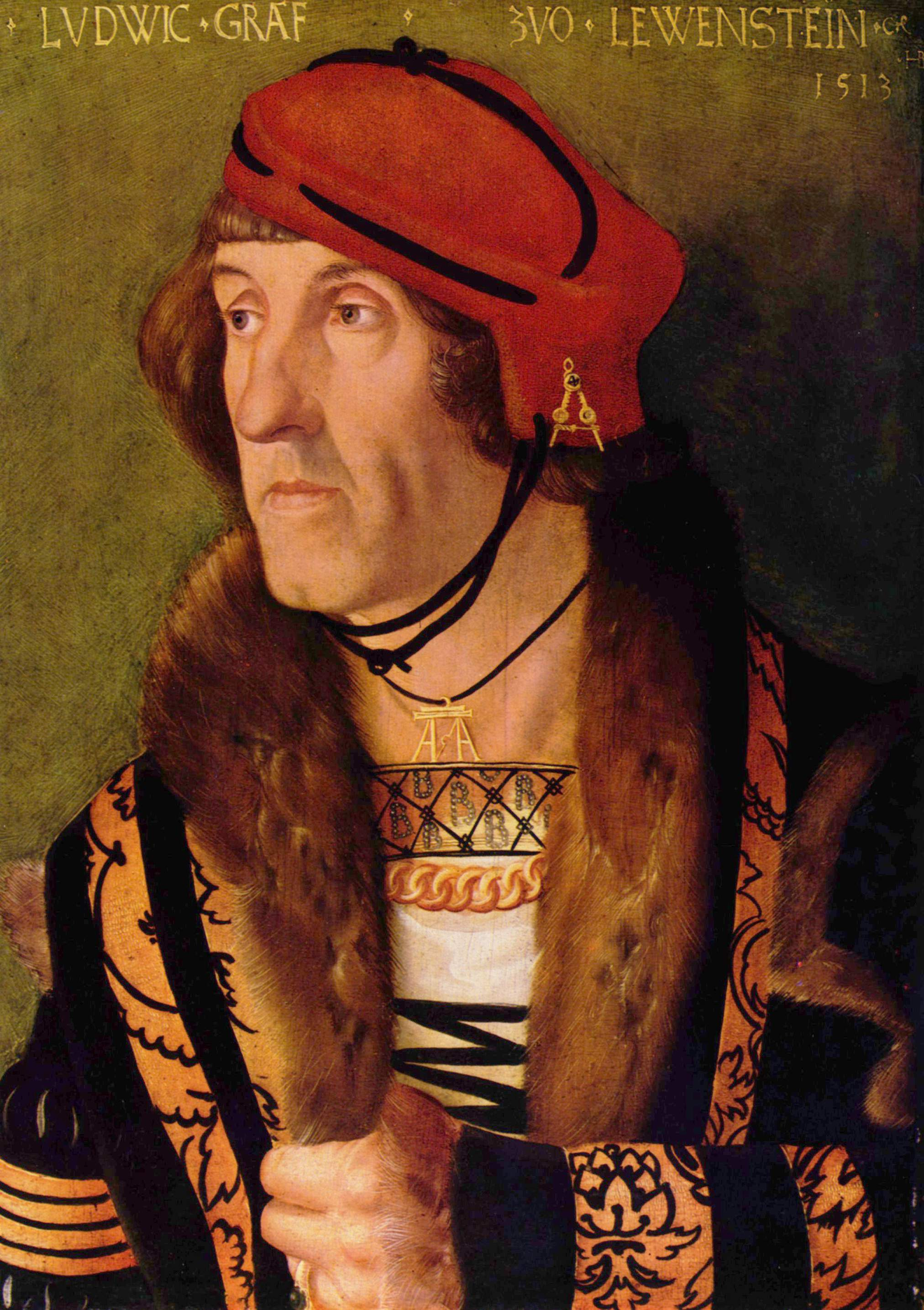
4 – 1513

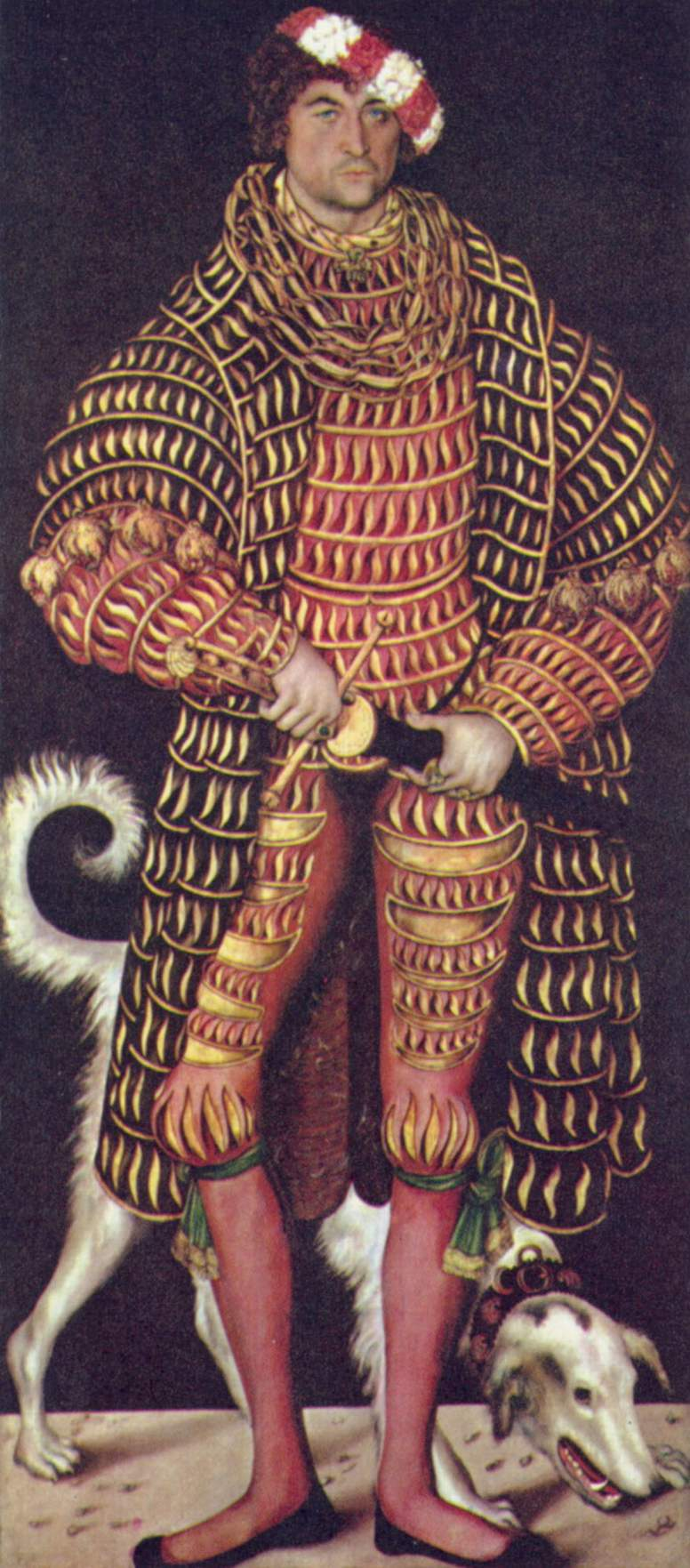
5 – 1514

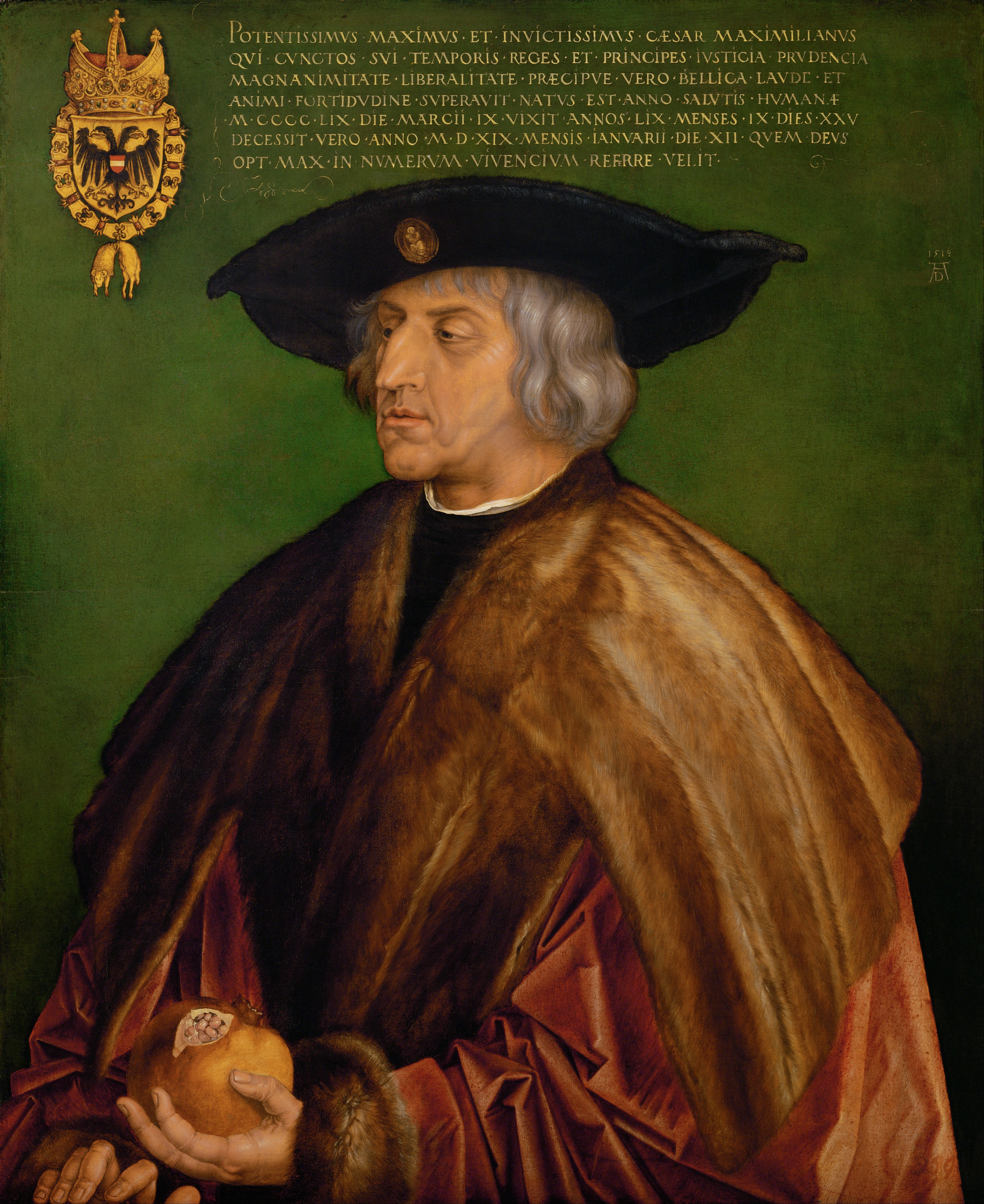
6 – 1519

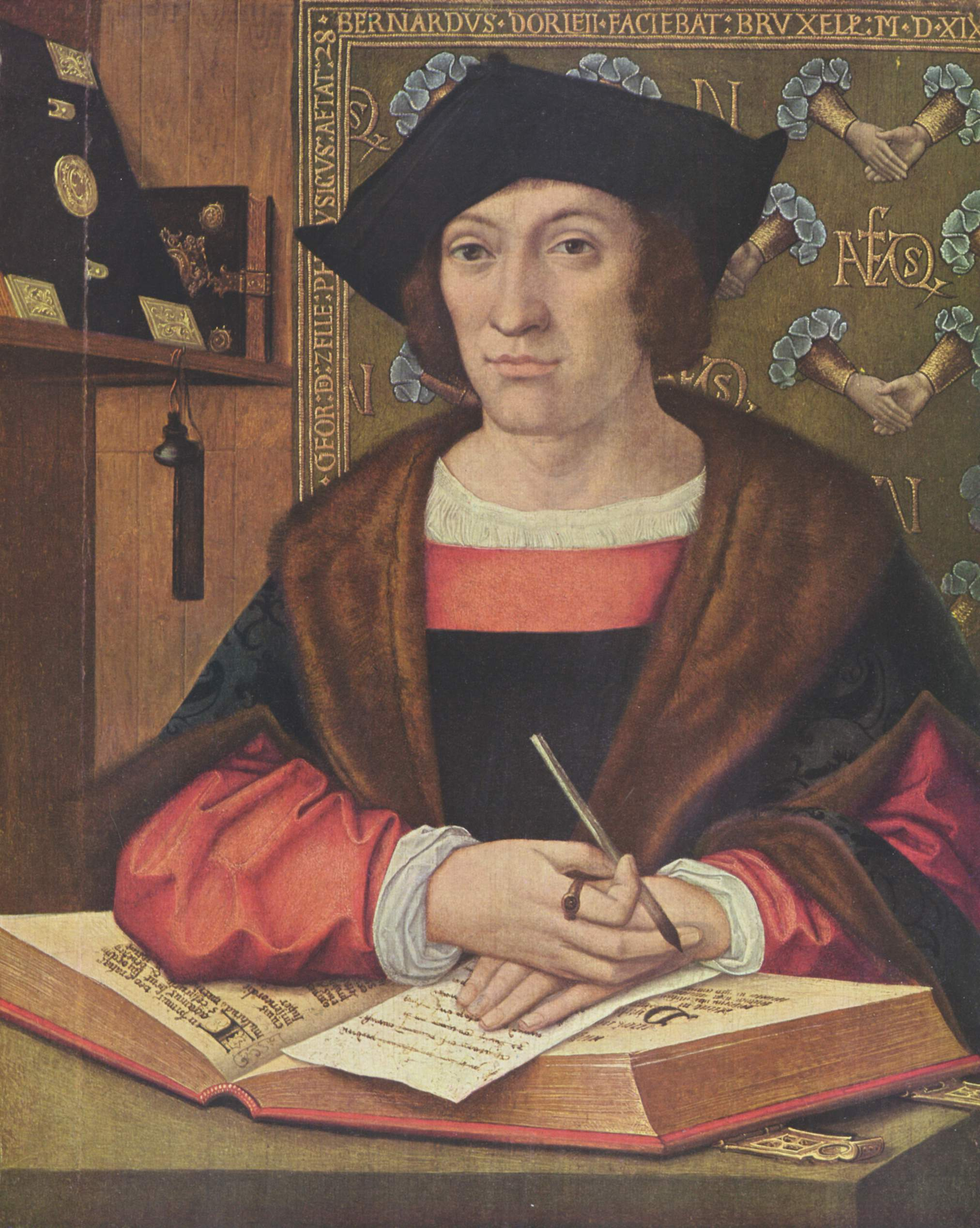
7 – 1519

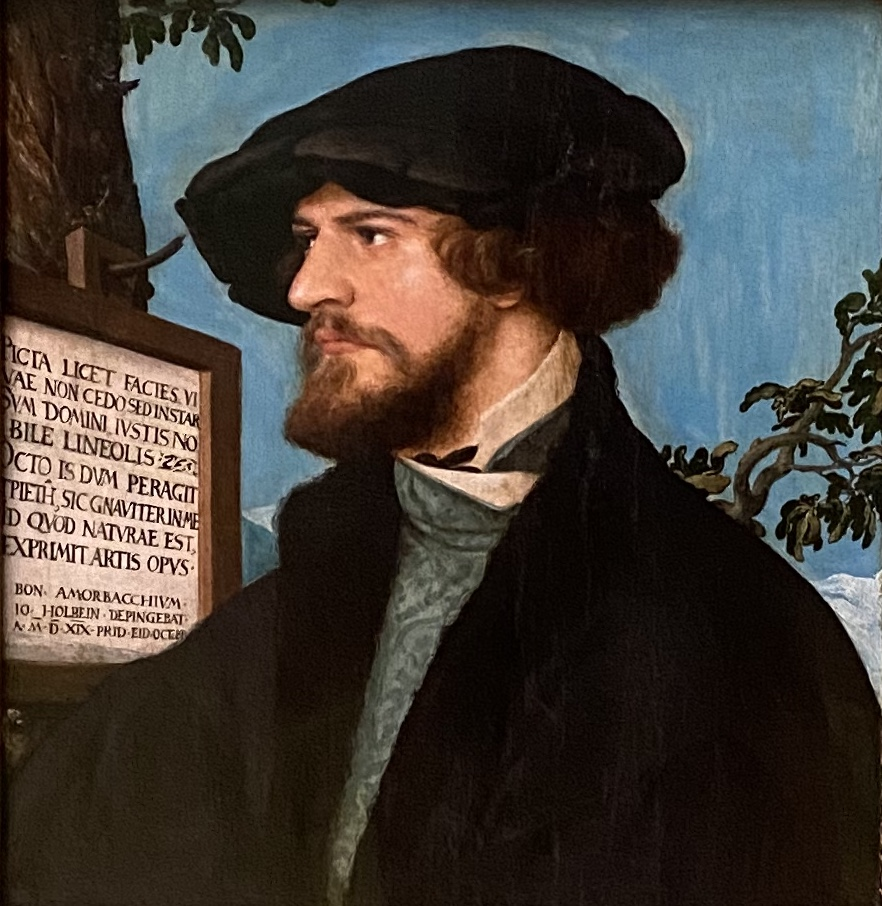
8 – 1519
1. Italian youth wears striped hose, a doublet with puffed upper sleeves, and a voluminous cloak, 1510.
2. The Swiss Guard at the Vatican wear full-skirted giornea or jerkins and full sleeves over low-necked shirts or chemises, 1512.
3. Unknown man wears a doublet with slashed sleeves and an overgown with a gray fur collar.
4. Ludwig, Count von Löwenstein wears a fur-lined overgown in the German fashion and a red barett with a jewel in the form of a pair of compasses, 1513.
5. German fashion includes a multitude of slashes in rows on doublet, hose and overgown, 1514.
6. The Emperor Maximilian I, in his portrait by Dürer, wears an overgown with a very wide fur collar and a broad-brimmed hat, 1519.
7. Georg Zelle wears a brocade overgown with a fur lining and slashed sleeves. The neck of his shirt is open, 1519.
8. Bonifazius Amerbach wears a high-necked shirt and a high-necked doublet under a dark overgown. His hat is rounded and soft, rather than angular, 1519.

=== Style gallery 1520–1535 ===
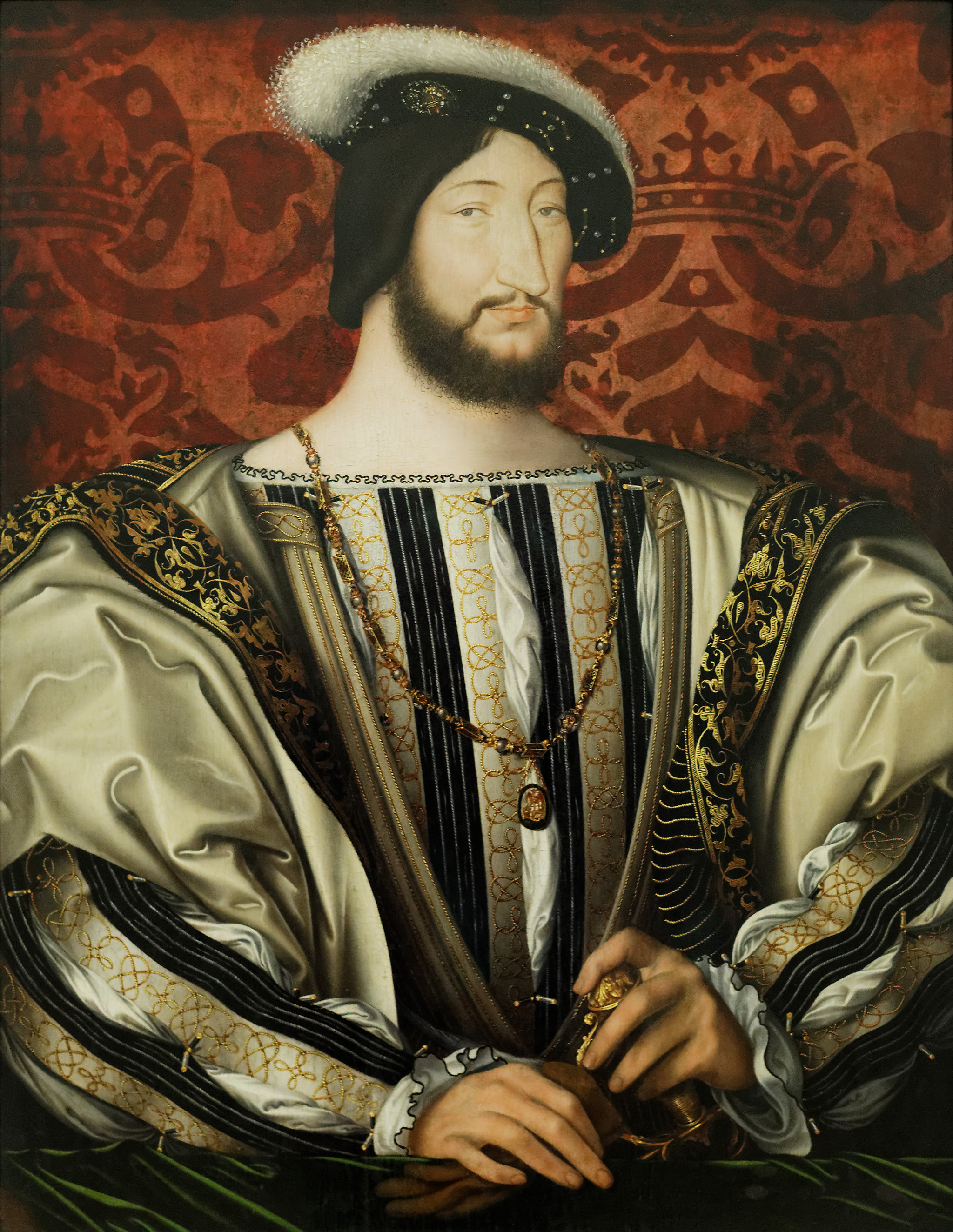
1 – 1520–25

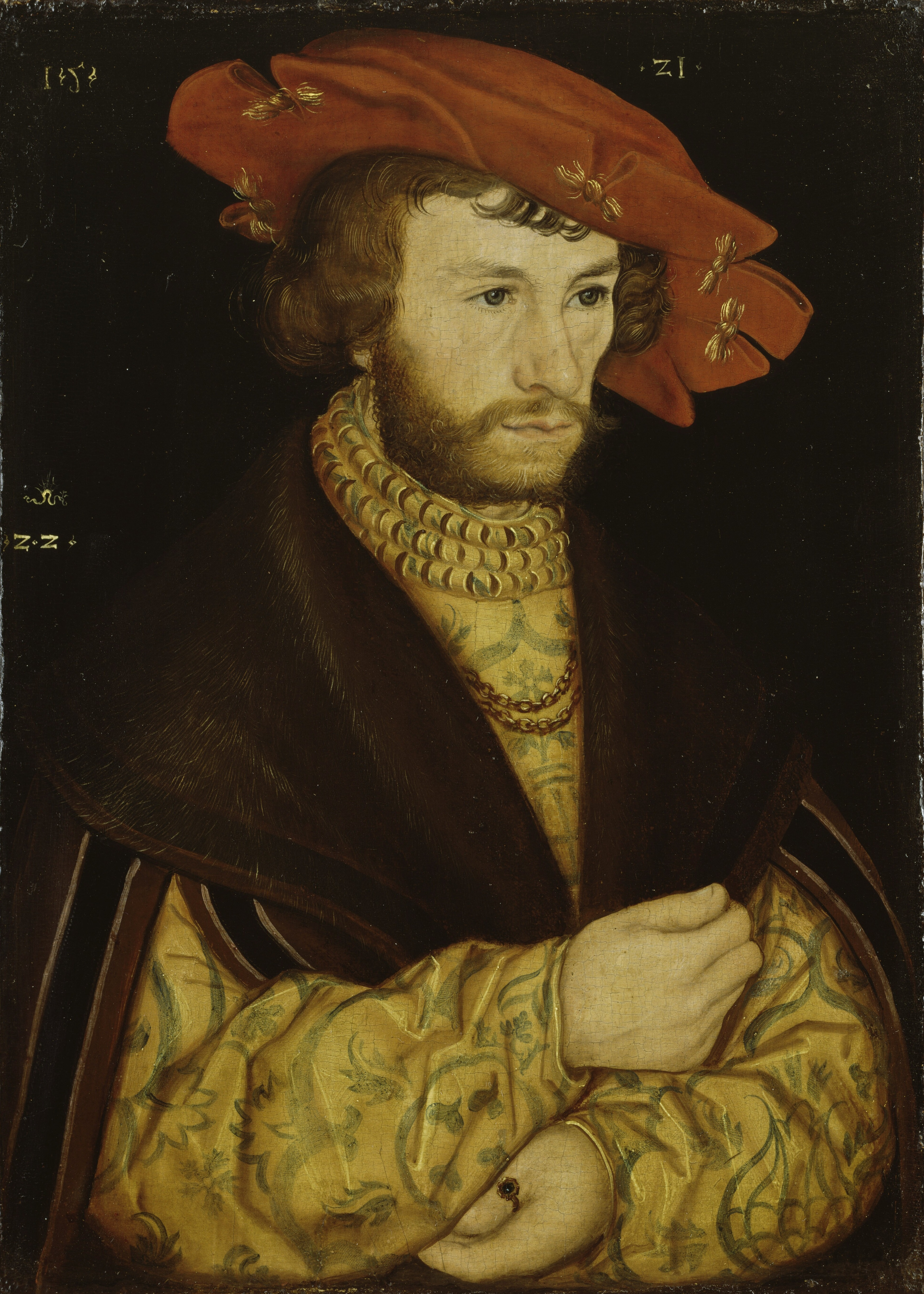
2 – 1521

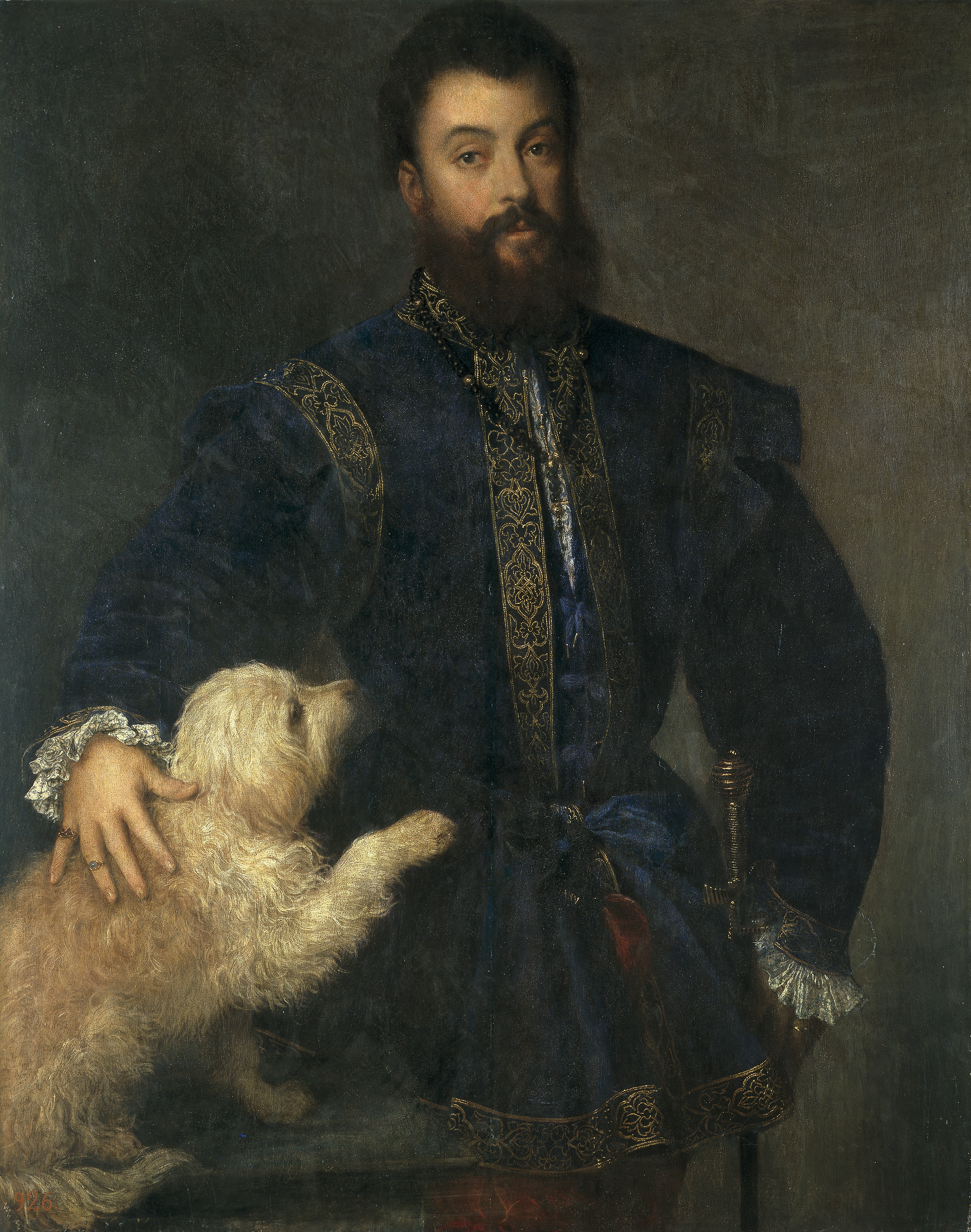
3 – 1525

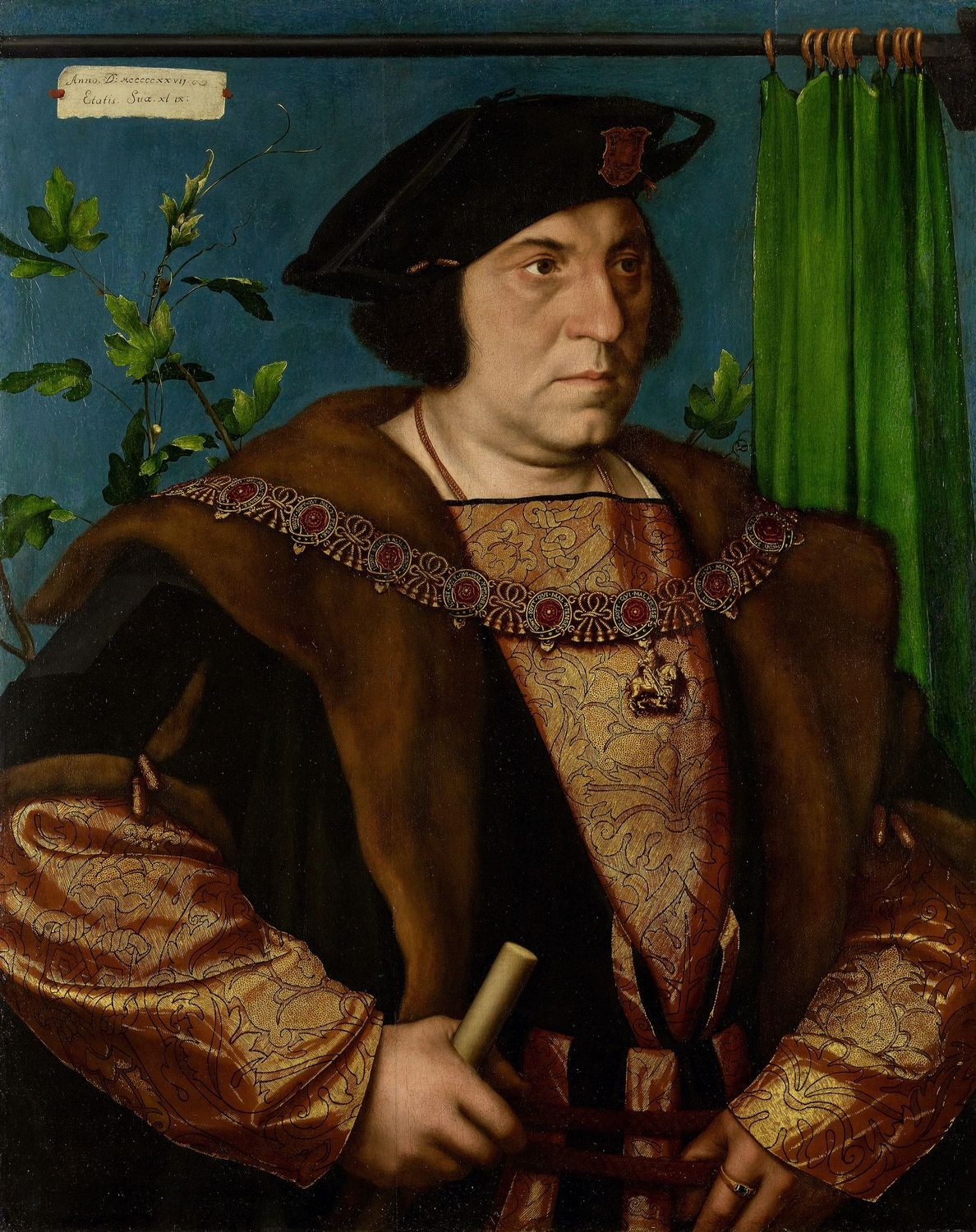
4 – 1527

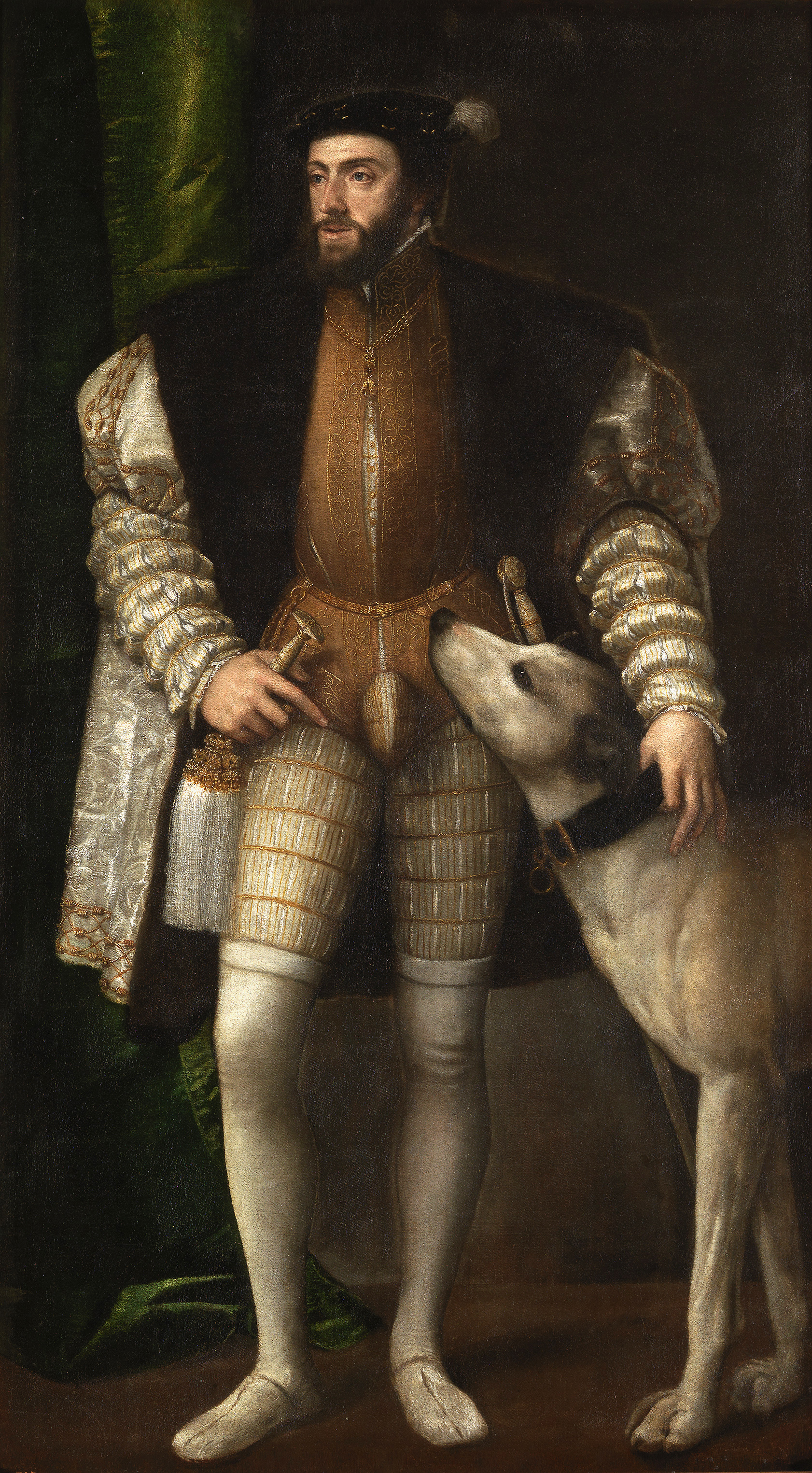
5 – 1532–33

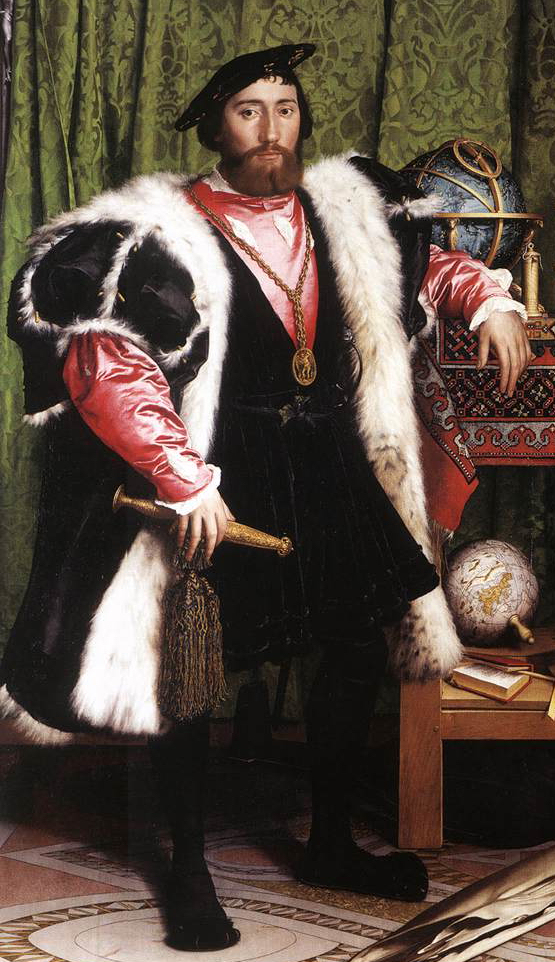
6 – 1533

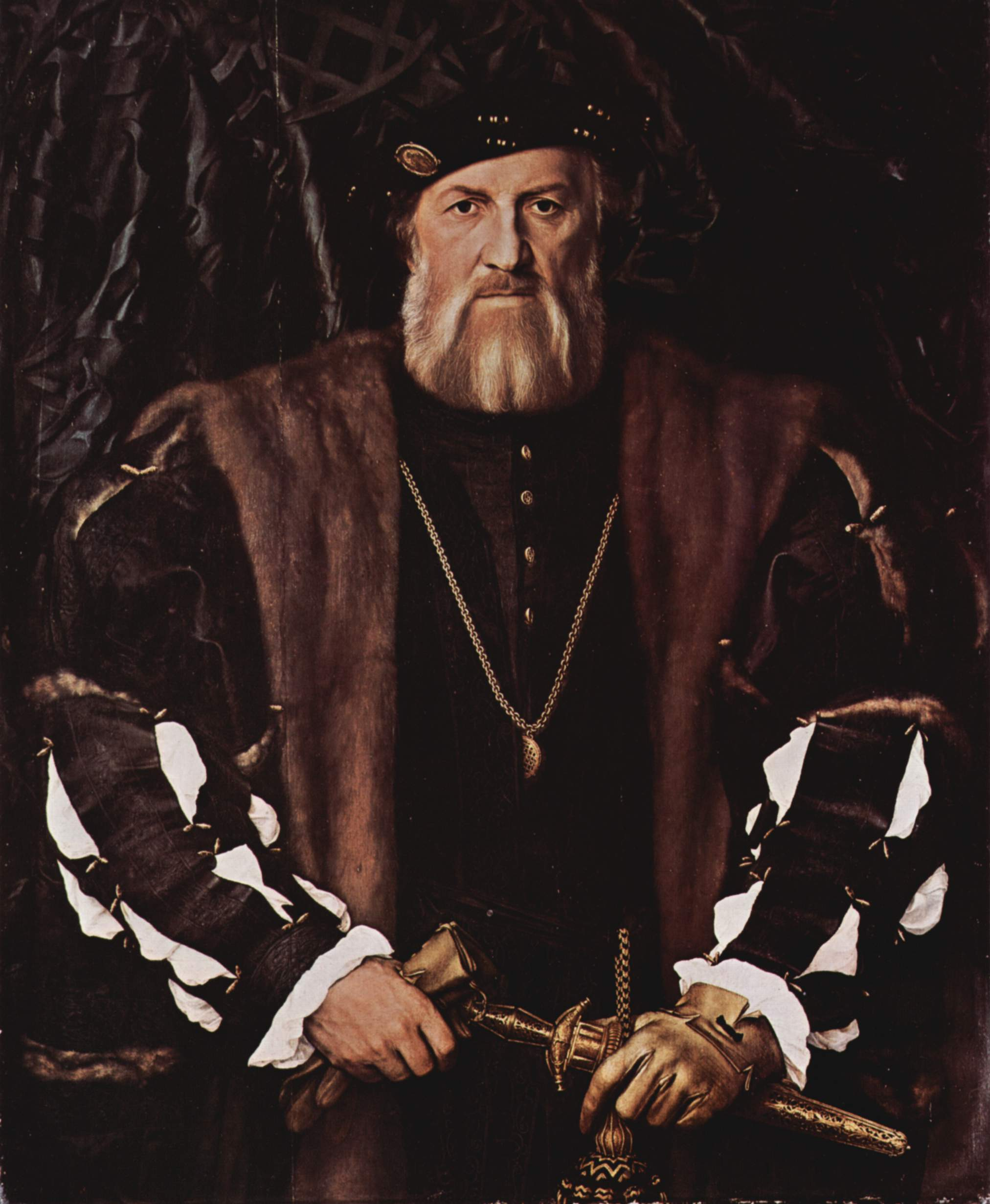
7 – 1534–35

8 – c. 1535
1. Francis I of France wears a wide-necked doublet with paned sleeves under dark gold jerkin and a satin overgown with turned-back sleeves. His shirt has a tiny frill edged in black at the neck and wide ruffles at the wrist. Jean Clouet, c. 1520–25.
2. Lucas Cranach the Elder's Young Man wears the later style of barett, wide and flat with a slashed brim. His high neckline is accented by parallel rows of slashes, and he wears a brown overgown, 1521.
3. Federico II Gonzaga wears a doublet with full skirts to mide thigh, soft "loops" at the shoulder, and gold embroidered bands at the border over bright red hose and a prominent codpiece, Italy, 1525.
4. Sir Henry Guildford wears a wide necked brocade doublet, a jerkin, and a fur-lined overgown. His wide-necked shirt is bare visible under his doublet the left shoulder. 1527.
5. Emperor Charles V wears slashed hose and sleeves in the German fashion. His overgown has puffed upper sleeves and a black (probably fur) lining. His shoes have squarish toes and reach high over his instep, 1532–33.
6. Jean de Dinteville, French ambassador to England, wears a fur-lined calf-length overgown over a black jerkin and a slashed doublet of rose-colored silk. His shoes are very square at the toes, 1533.
7. Charles de Solier, Sieur de Morette wears a high-necked doublet under darker jerkin and an overgown. His sleeves are paned (made in strips) and fastened with jewels. The square beard was very popular with the broad silhouette of 1534–5.
8. Holbein's Man with a Lute wears a transitional costume—a wide-necked doublet with a high, banded-neckline shirt, c. 1535.

=== Style gallery 1535–1550 ===
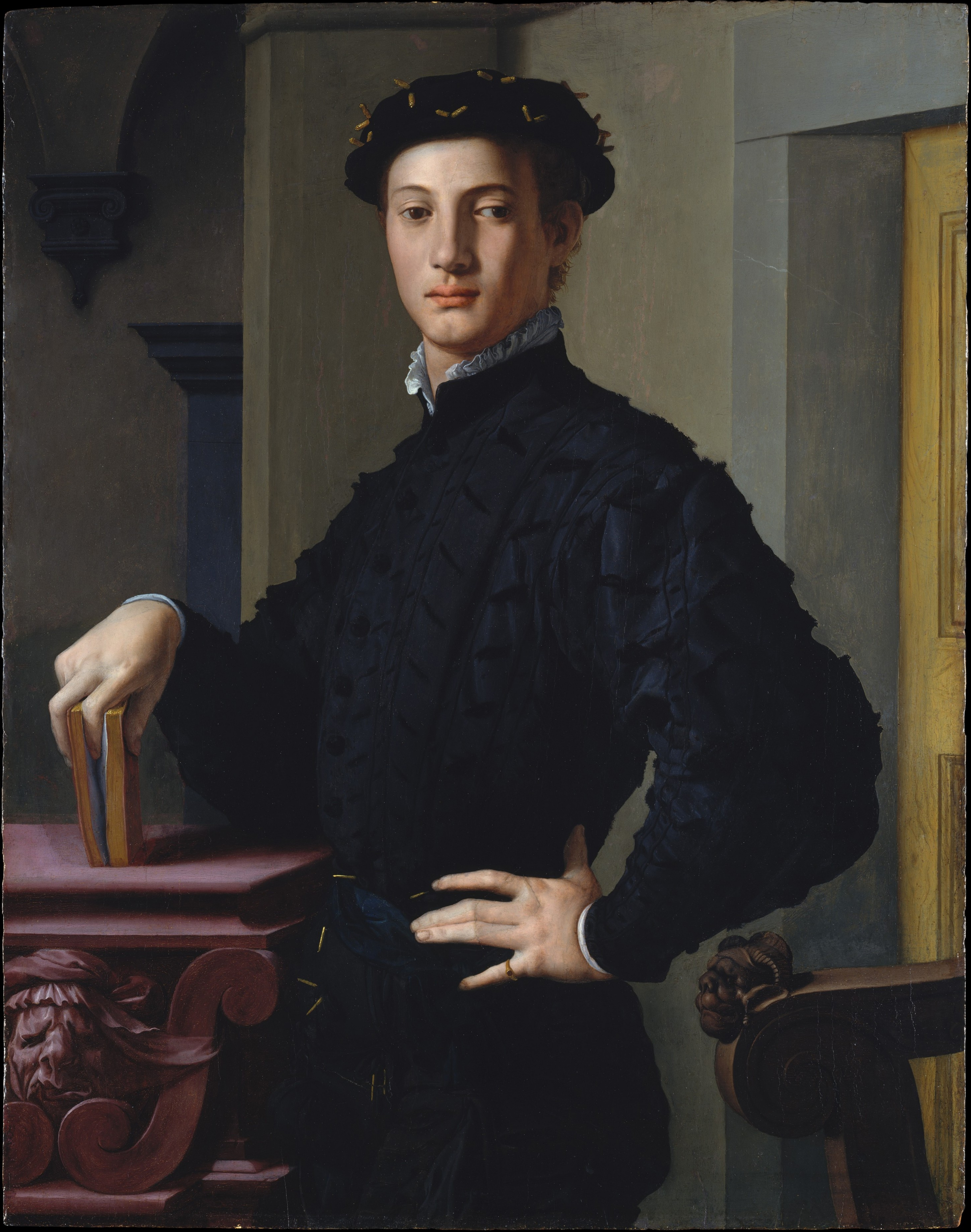
1 – 1535–40

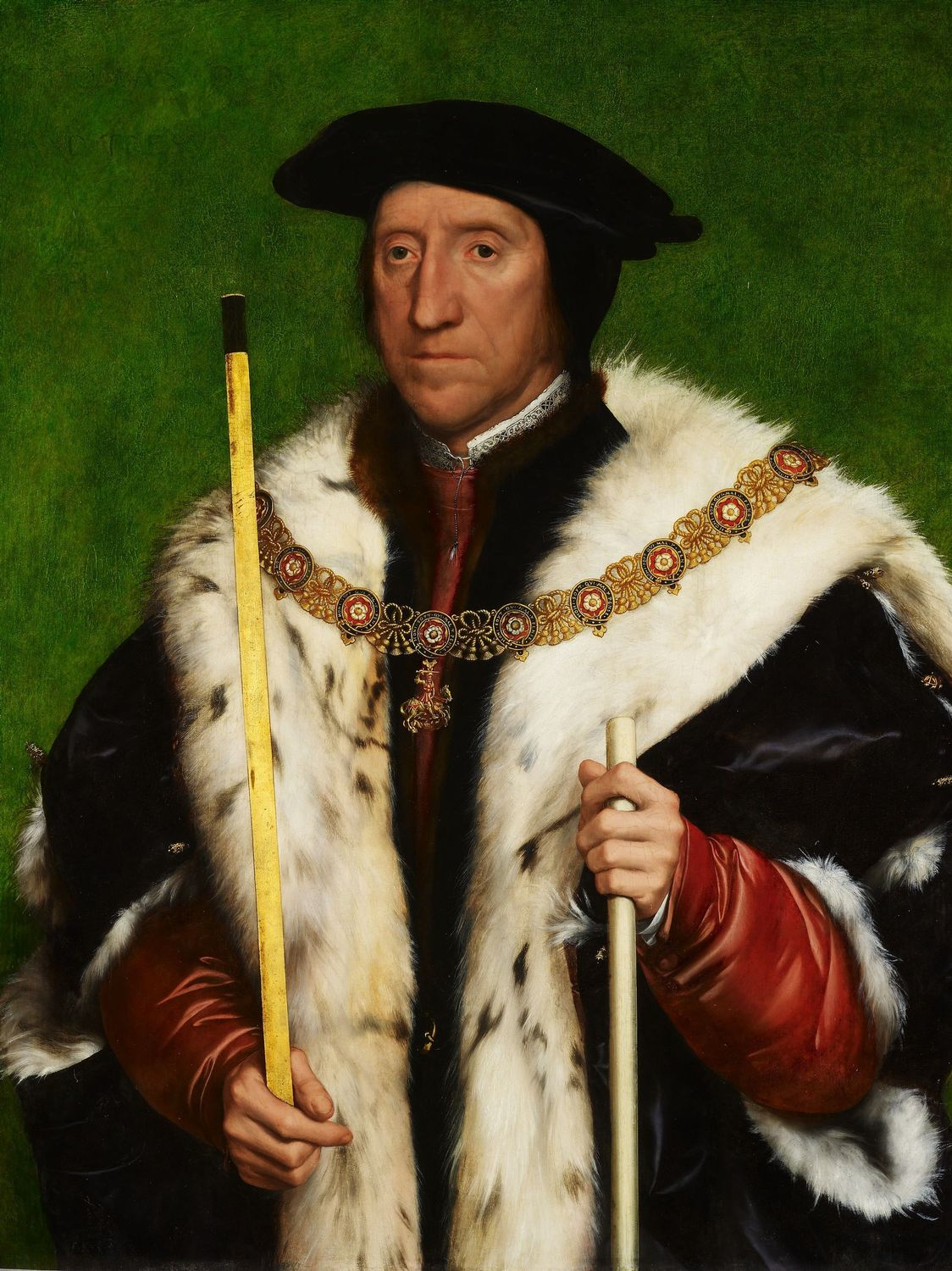
2 – 1539–40

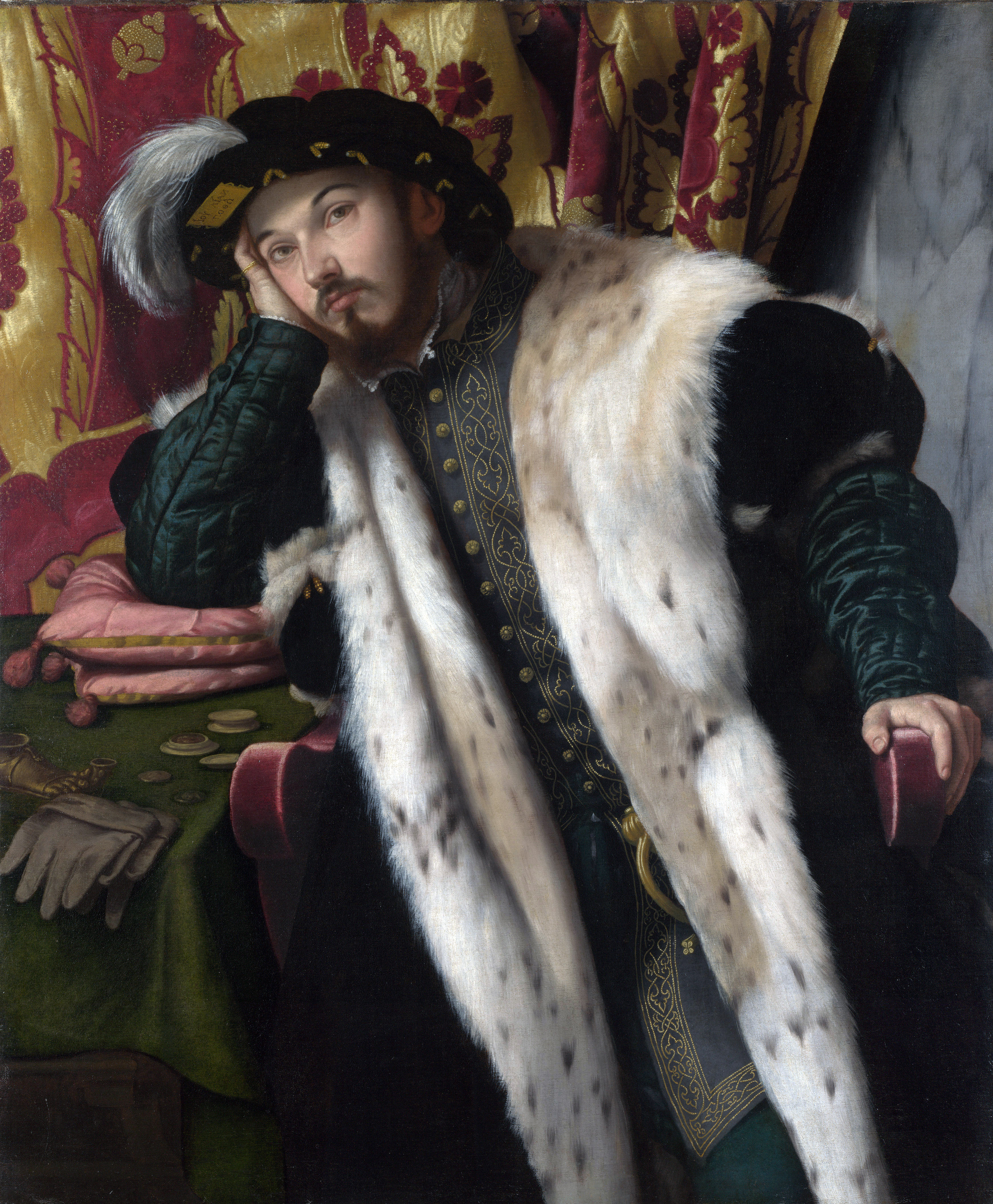
3 – c. 1540–42

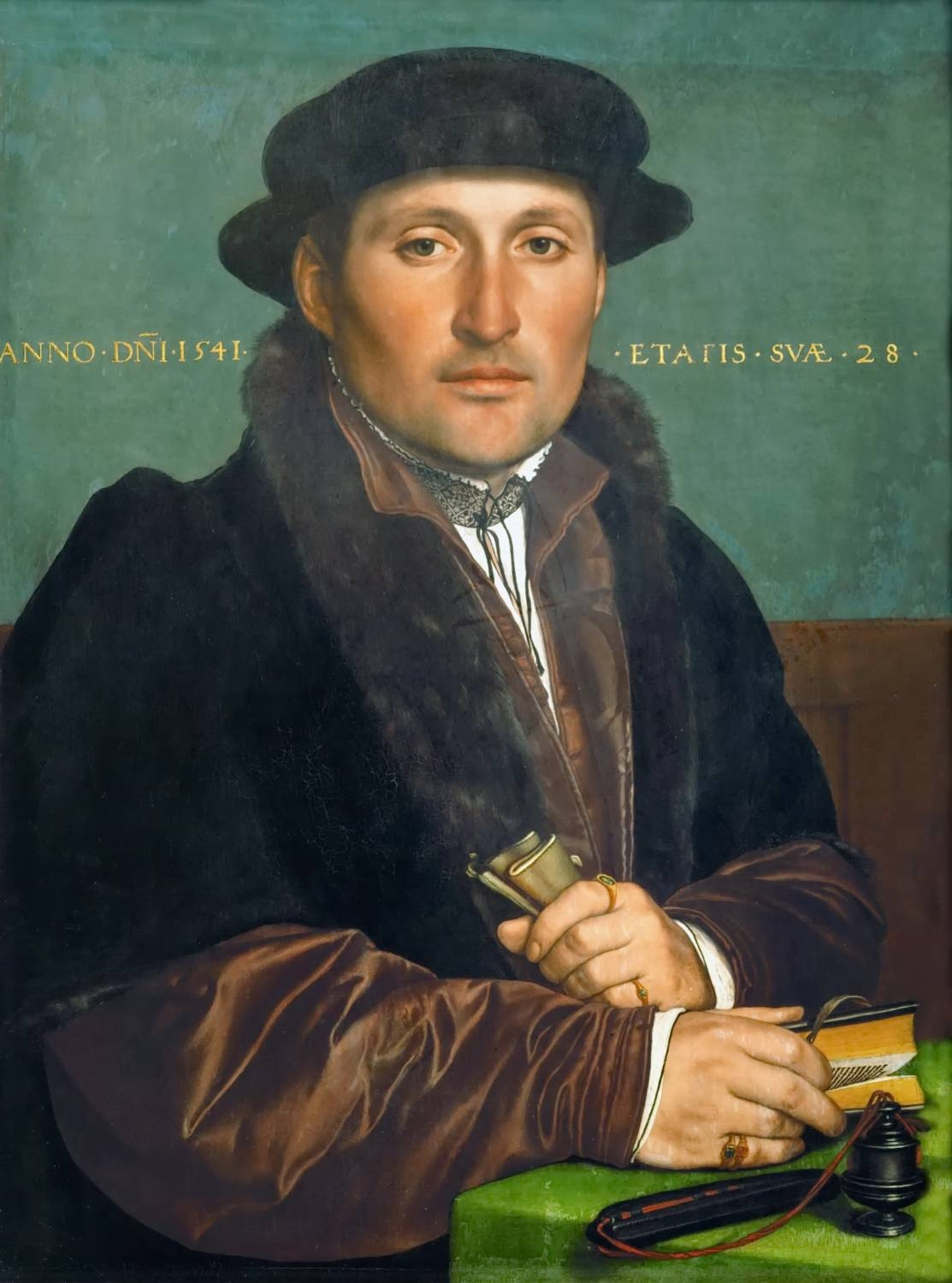
4 – 1541

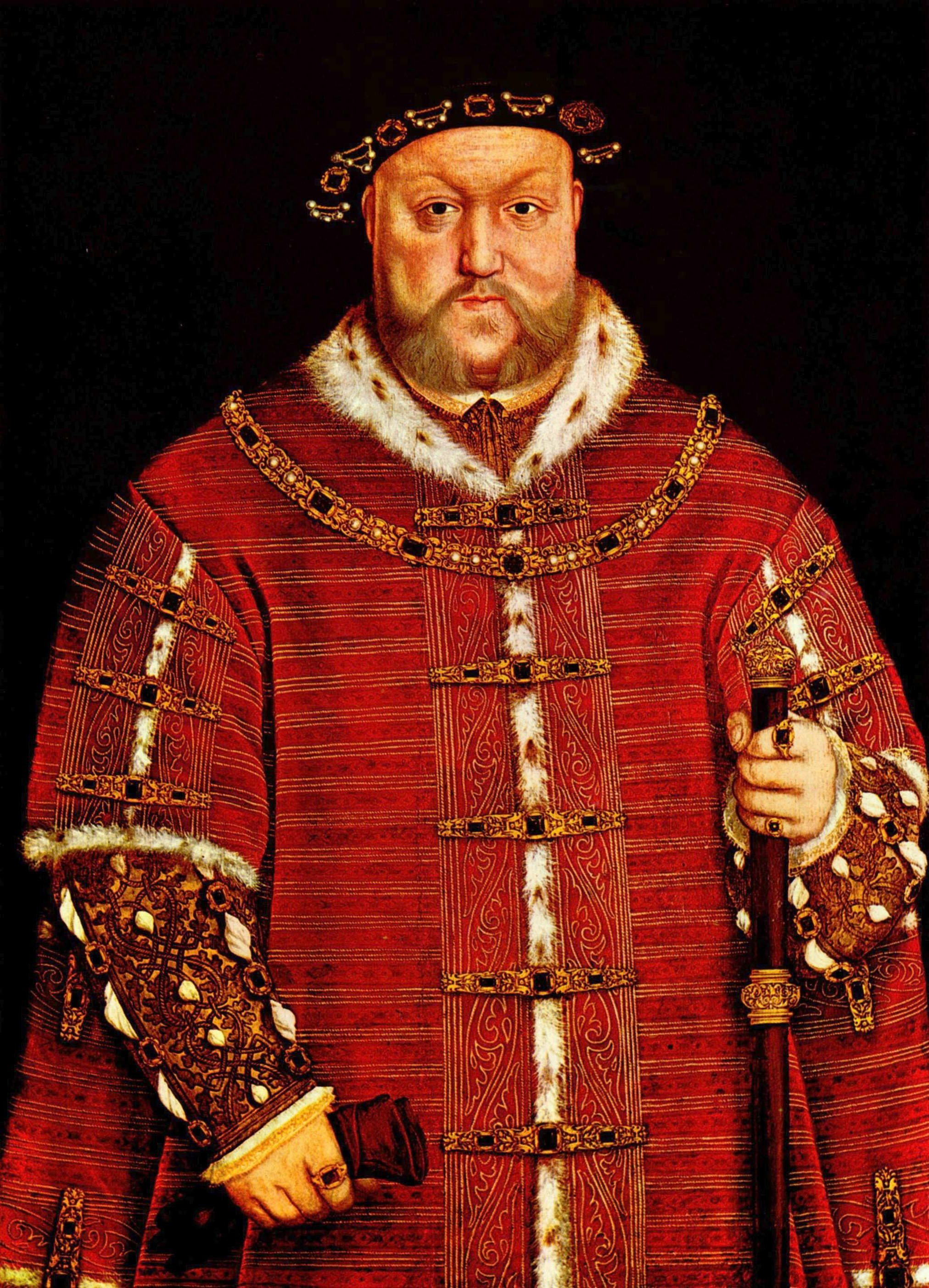
5 – 1542

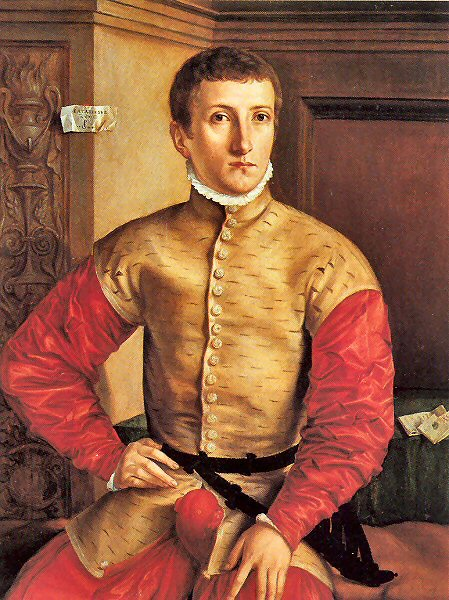
6 – 1544

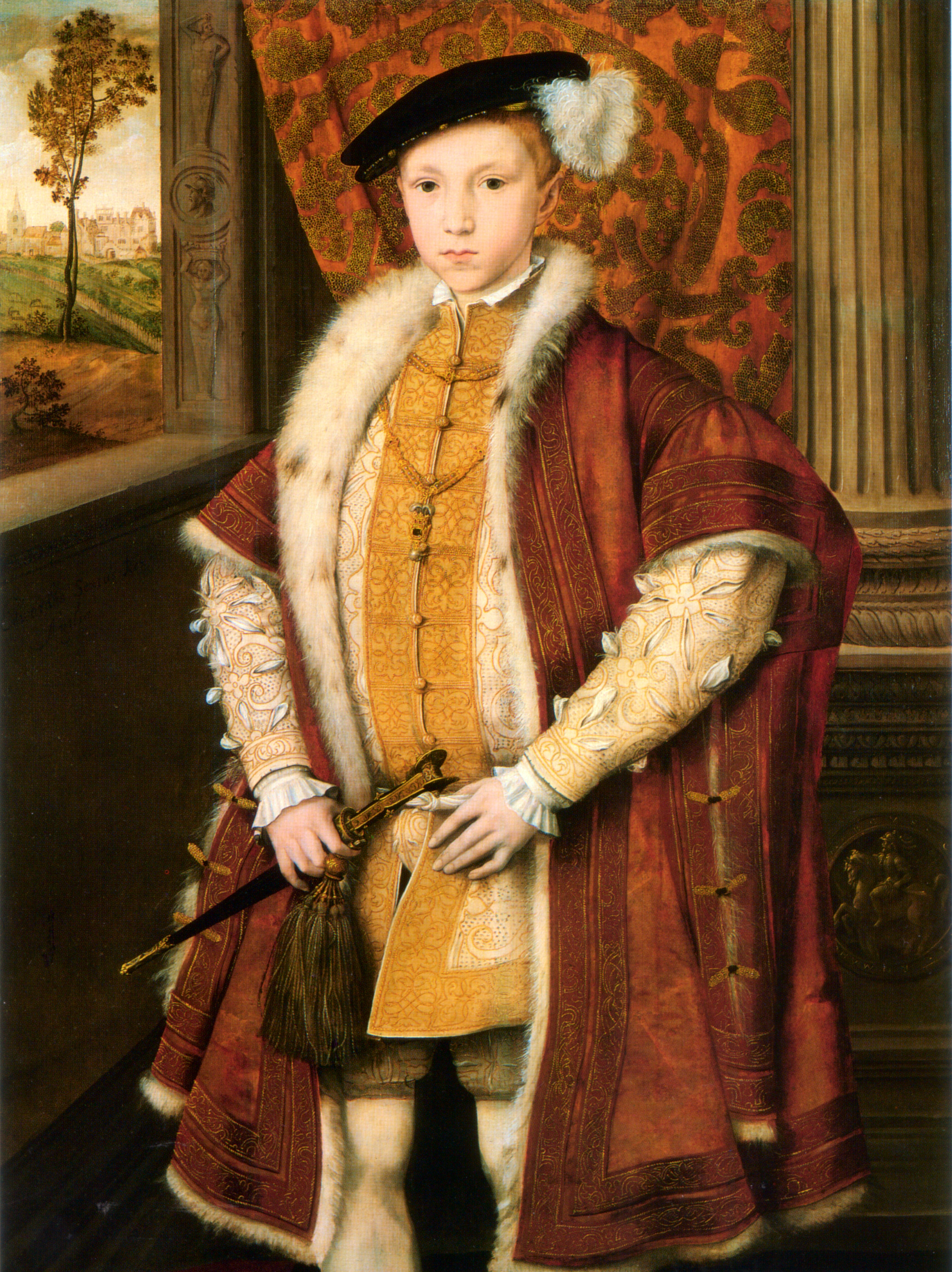
7 – 1546

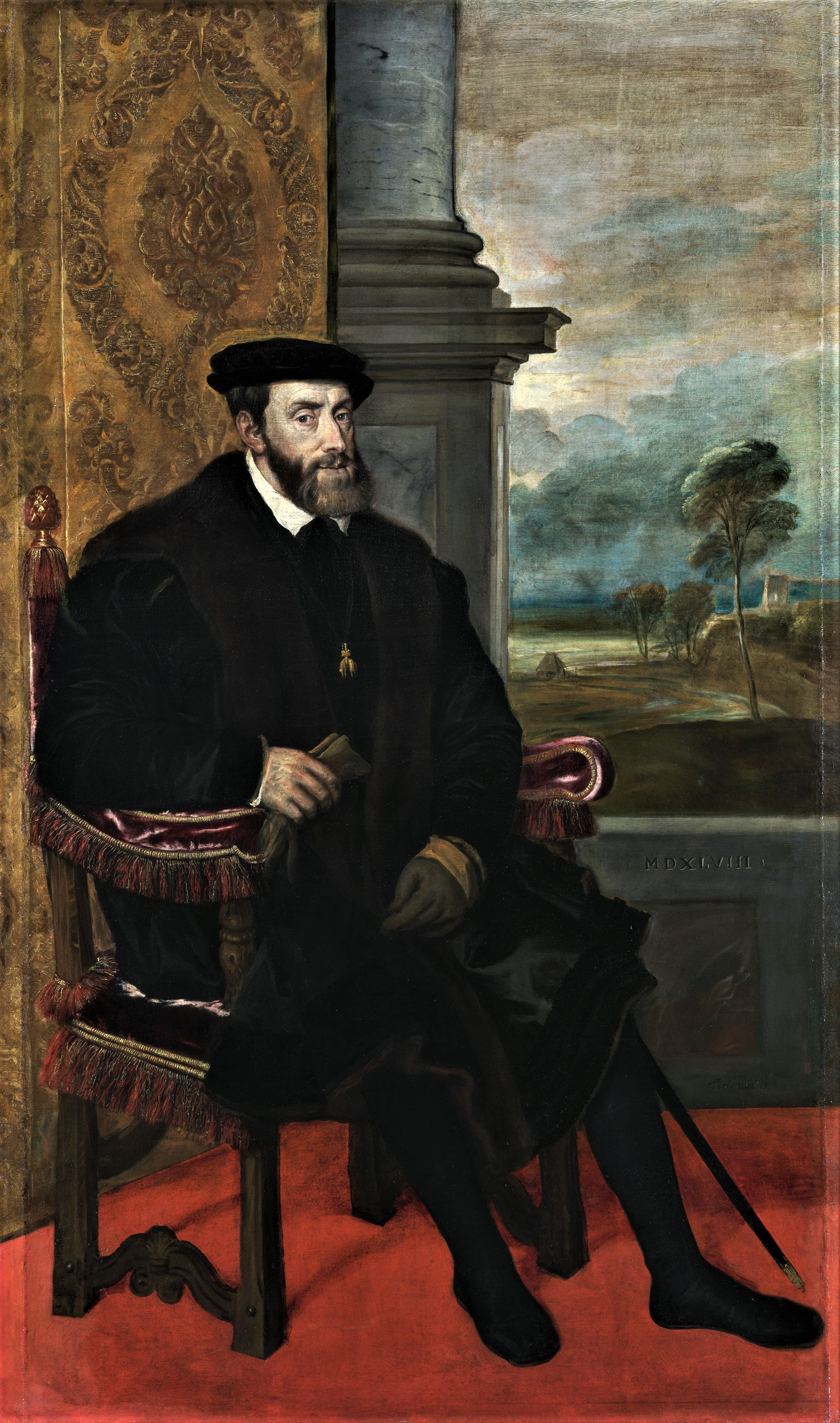
8 – 1548
1. Bronzino's Young Man with a Book wears a dark slashed doublet with a standing collar and matching hose. His shirt has a small ruffle at the neck, and his hat is decorated with pairs of metal tags or aiglettes. Florence, 1535–40.
2. Thomas Howard, 3rd Duke of Norfolk wears a black overgown lined with lynx fur over a jerkin lined in a brown fur and a reddish doublet. His shirt has an embroidered standing collar. He wears a black "halo" hat over a black coif, and the collar of the Order of the Garter, 1539–40.
3. Count Sciarra Martinengo Cesaresco wears an overgown lined in lynx over a blue doublet with quilted sleeves. His hat badge is inscribed in Greek "Alas! [I] yearn exceedingly".
4. Unknown man in a modest costume of 1541. He wears a brown satin doublet with full, unslashed "round" sleeves under a dark overgown. His shirt has a standing band with embroidery and a ruffle.
5. Henry VIII in 1542 wears a closed red ermine-lined overgown with narrower shoulders and a high collar.
6. Seated youth wears a pinked and slashed leather jerkin and a black sword belt and hanger over a red doublet and red hose with a prominent codpiece. Germany, 1544.
7. Edward VI wears the leaner, narrow fashions of 1546. The shoulders are no longer wide, and the jerkin's skirts are flared but not gathered, and are shorter than the hose.
8. Emperor Charles V wears a black, fur-lined overgown over a black doublet, hose, stockings and shoes. His shoes have slightly rounded rather than square toes, 1548.

== Footwear ==
Style in men's and women's footwear was the same in this period. Shoes for men and women were flat, and often slashed and fastened with a strap across the instep. They were made of soft leather, velvet, or silk. Broad, squared toes were worn early, and were replaced by rounded toes in the 1530s. Toward the middle of the century, shoes became narrower and were shaped naturally to the foot. Soft boots for riding fitted to mid-calf.

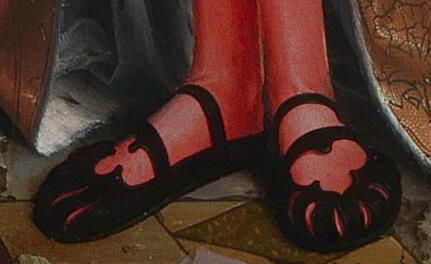
German bear-claw shoe, c. 1505

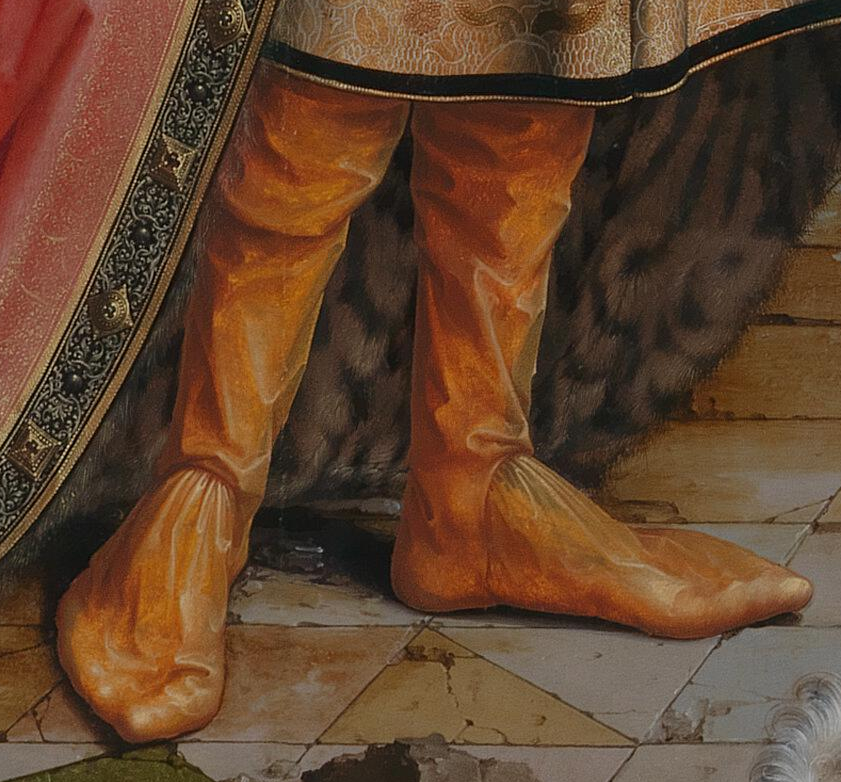
Boots from the same painting

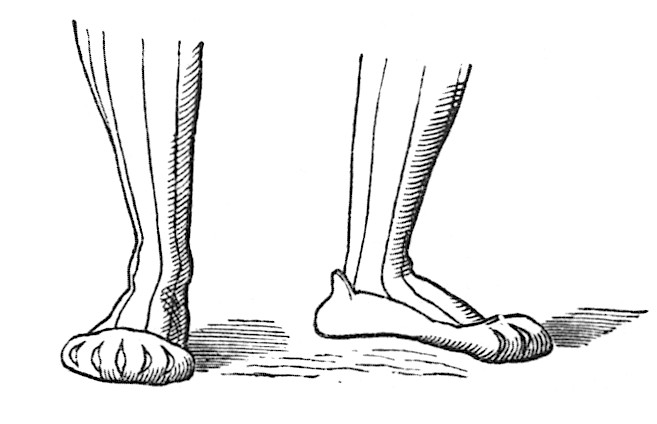
German bear-claw shoe, 1800s illustration

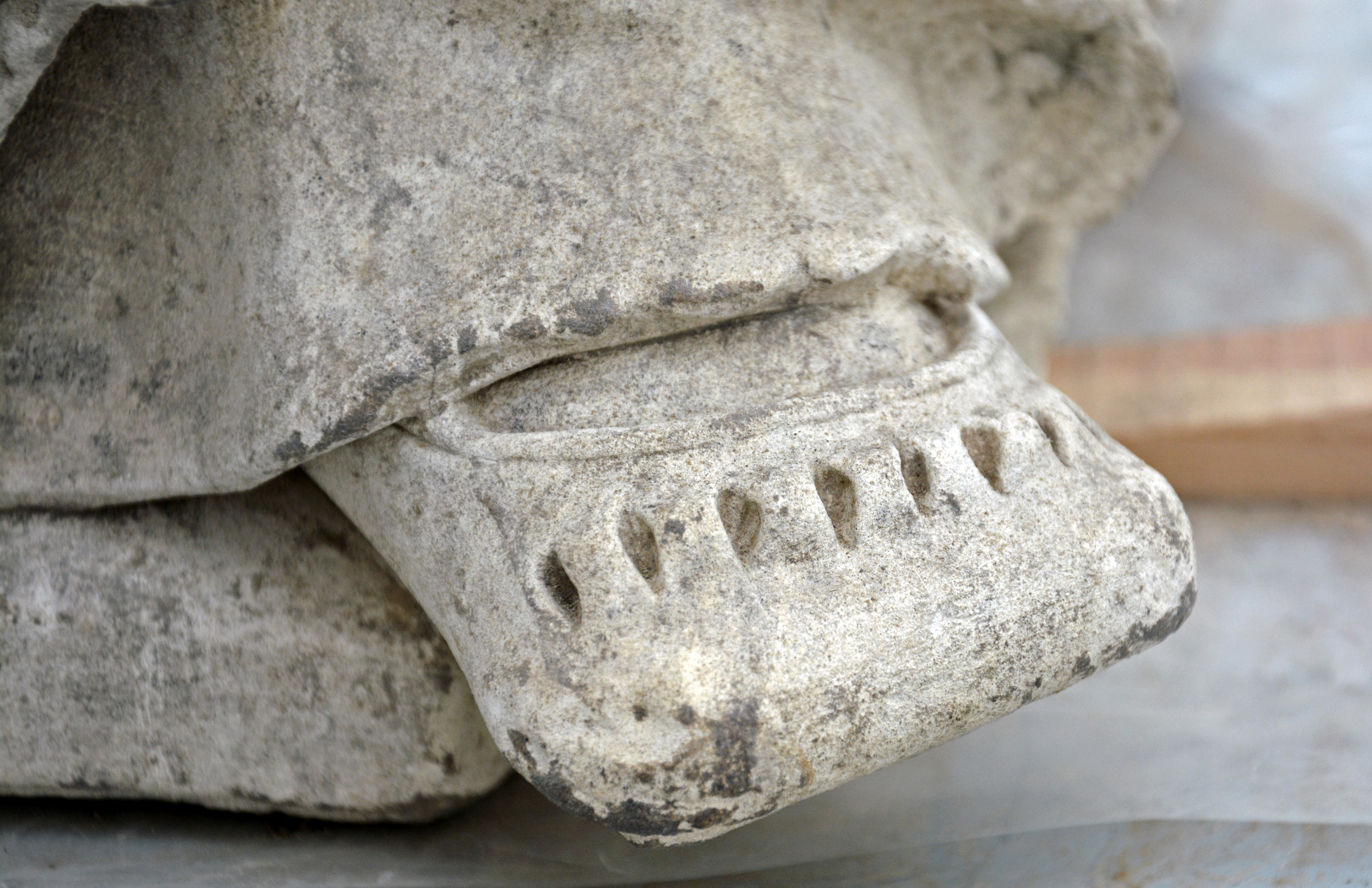
French duckbill shoe, circa 1520

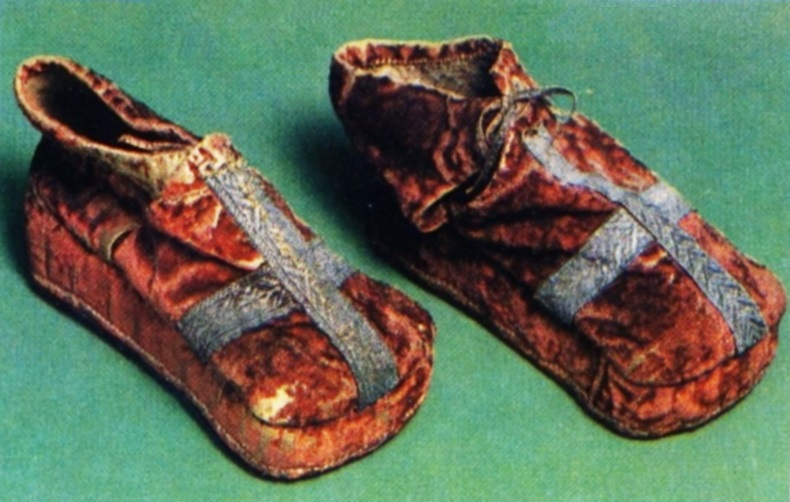
Polish boy's duckbill platform shoes, 1530

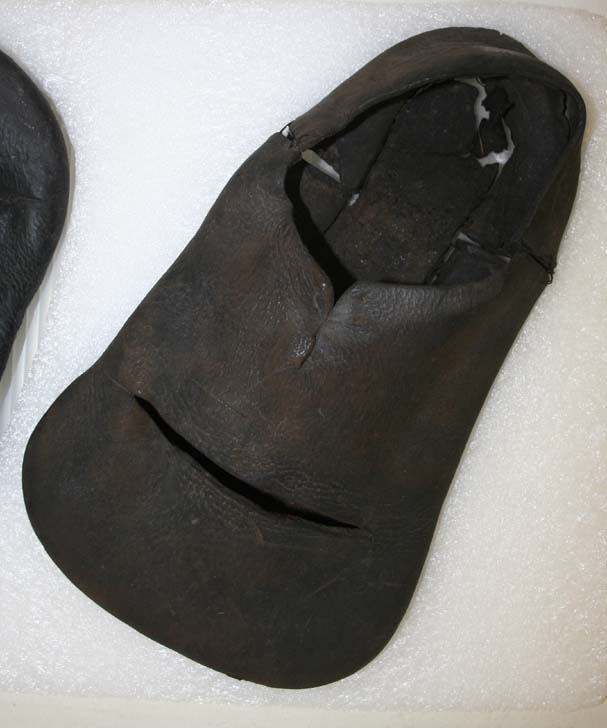
English commoner's duckbill shoe, 1500s

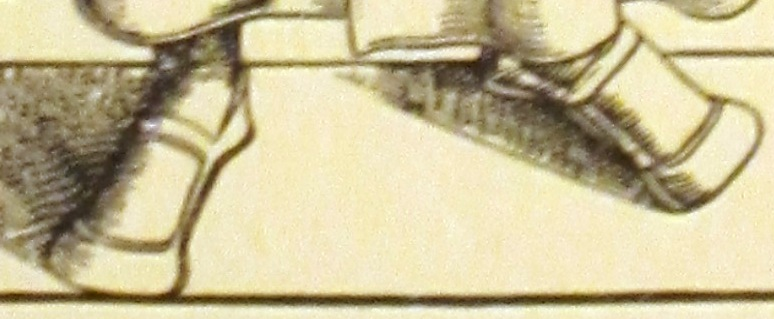
Duck-bill shoes of a Wittenberg pastor, 1546

== Children's fashion ==
As shown in the images below, children's clothing was mostly smaller versions of adult clothing, complete with low necklines and cumbersome underthings. Children of the nobility must have had limited freedom of movement to play and romp because of the restrictive clothing they wore. Toddler boys wore gowns until they were breeched.

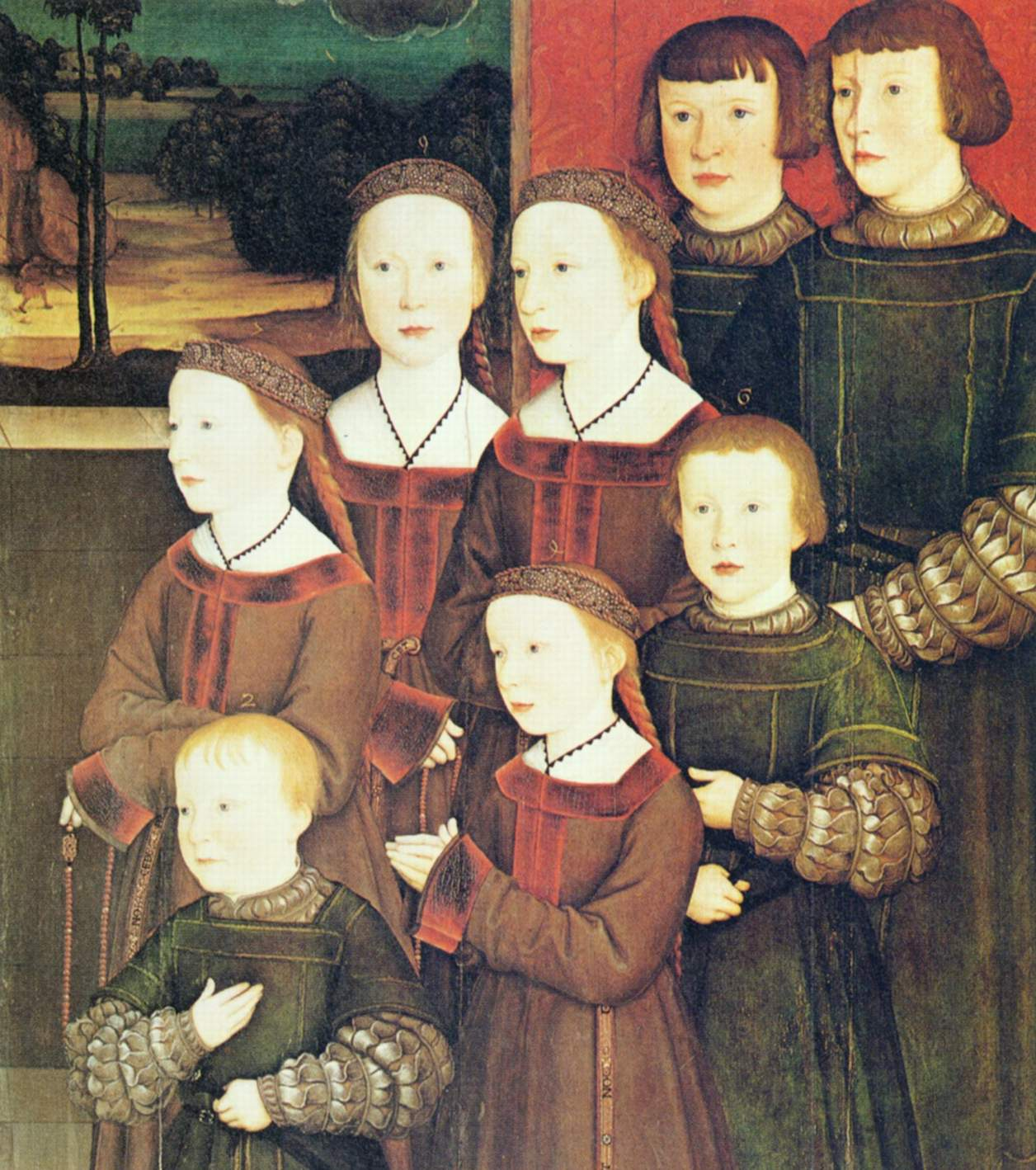
German, 1517

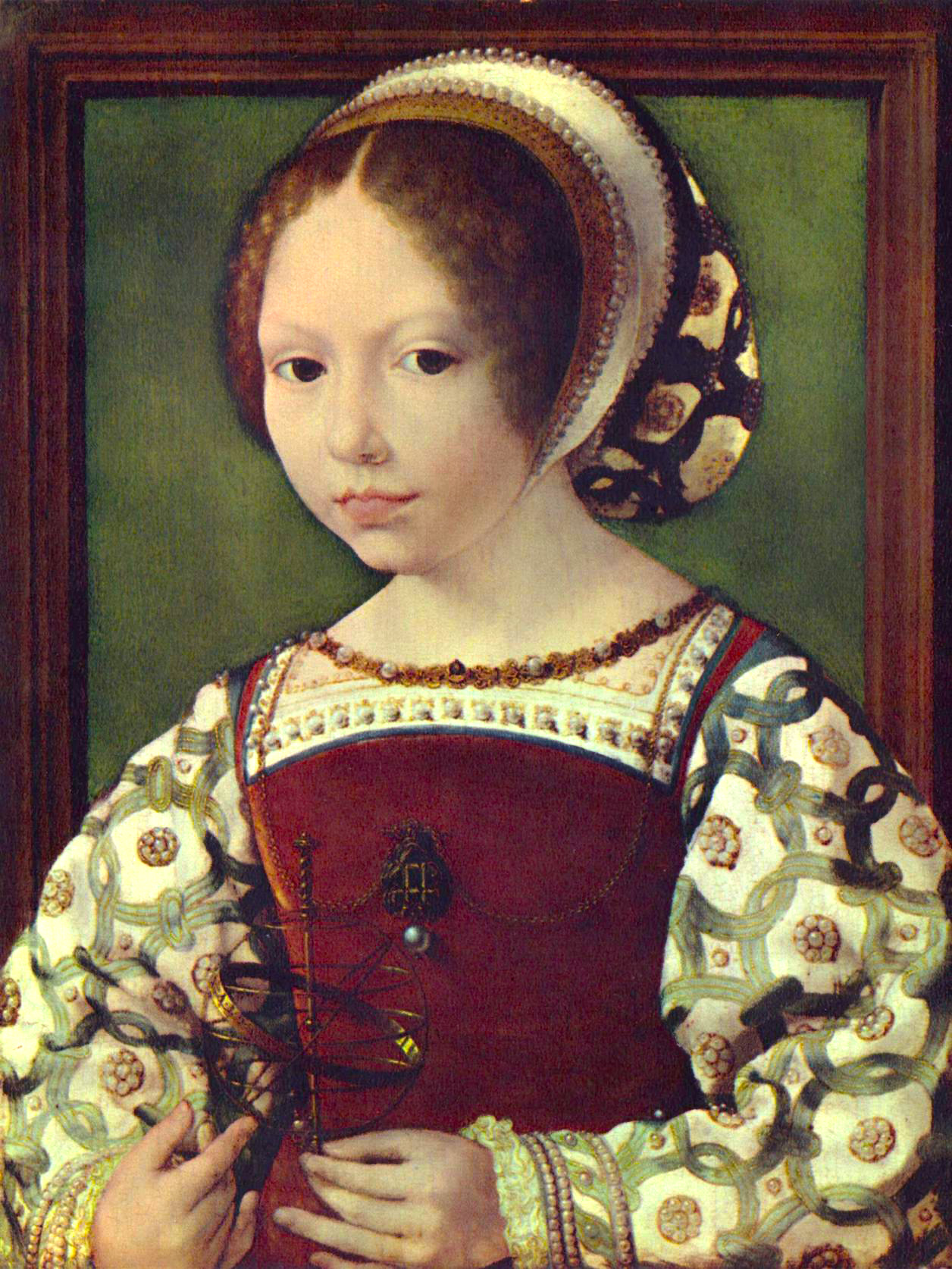
Probably French, 1520–35

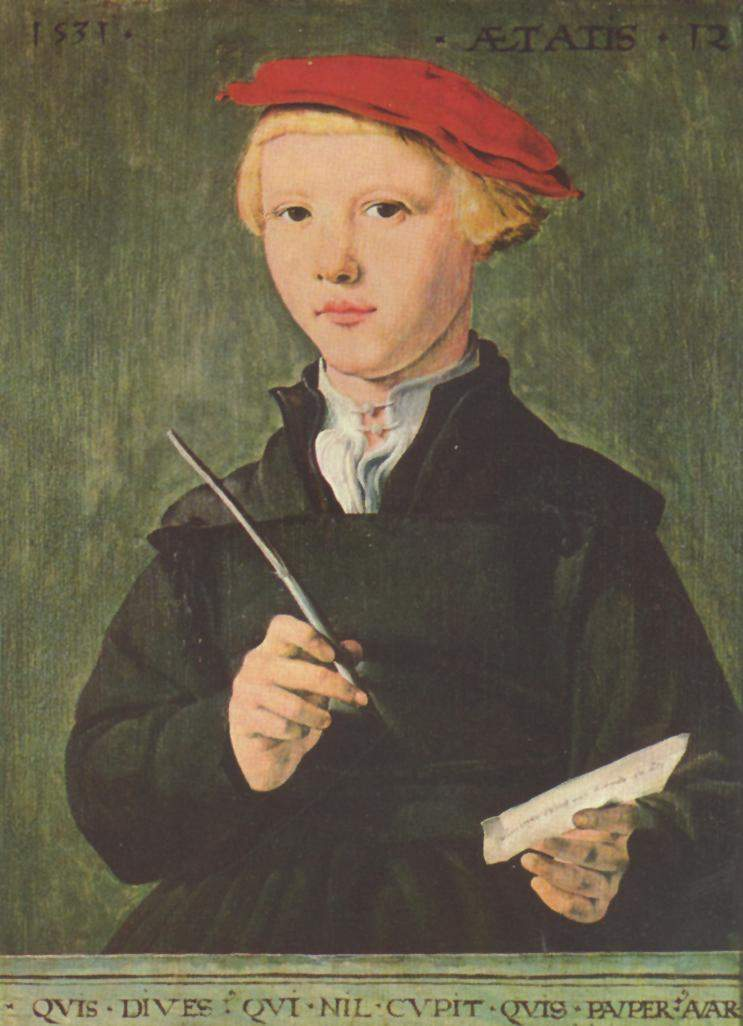
Dutch, 1531

England, 1538

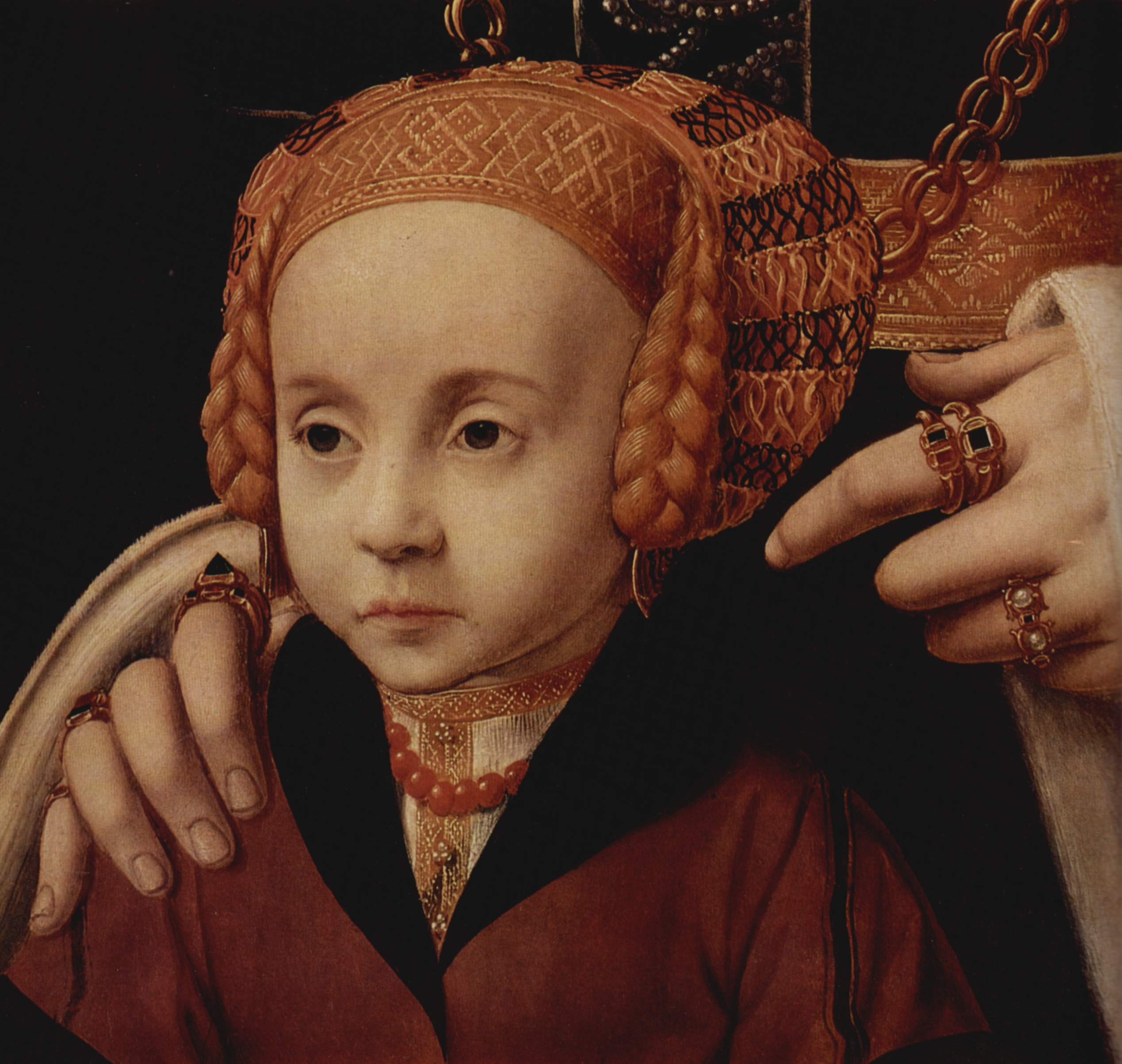
German, 1530–45

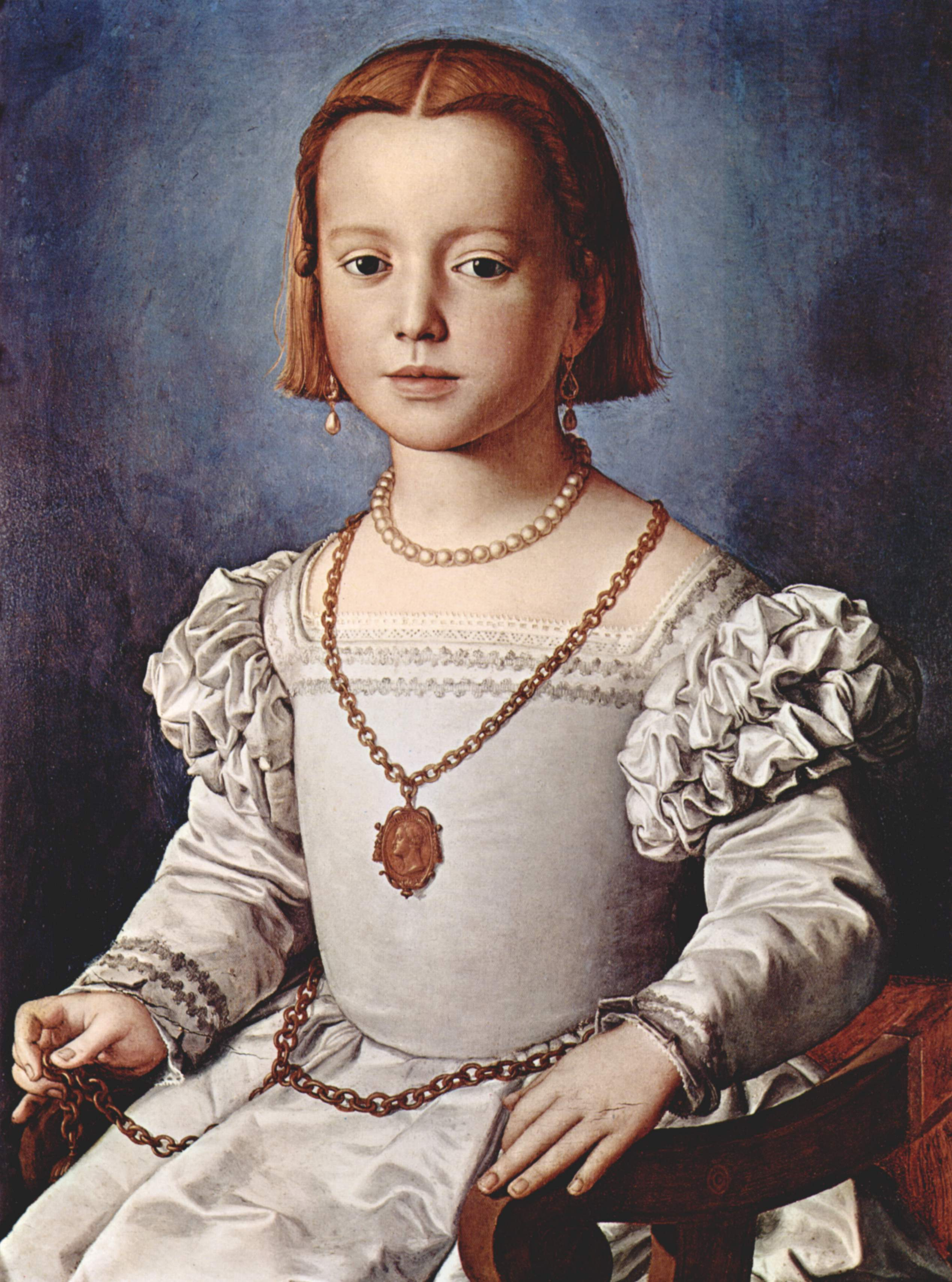
Italy, 1545

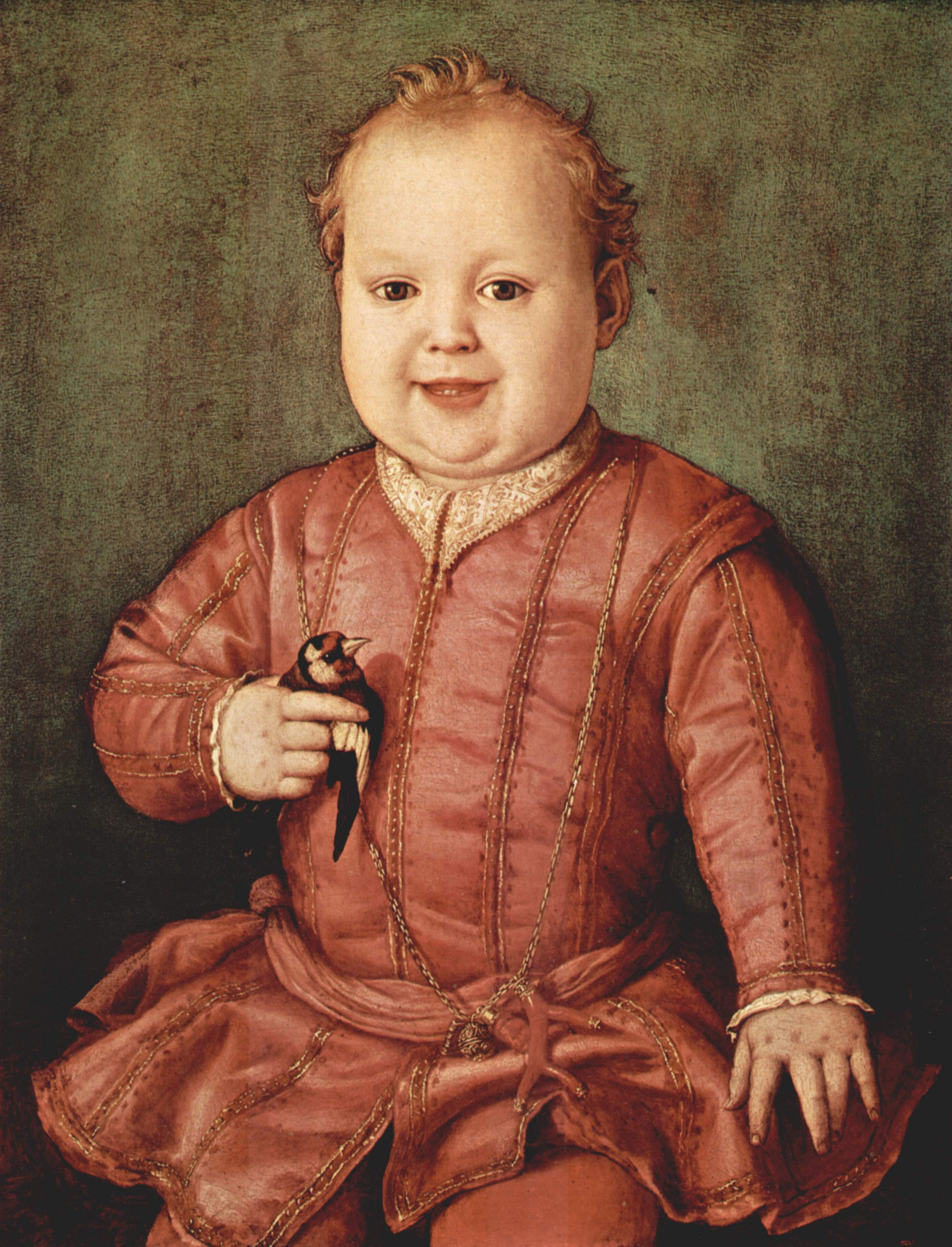
Italy, 1545

== Working class clothing ==
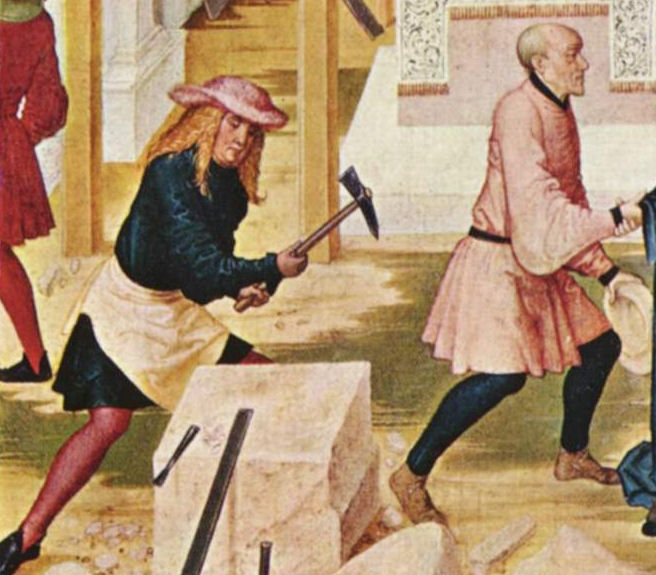
1 – c. 1505

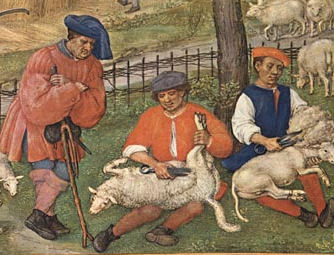
2 – c. 1510

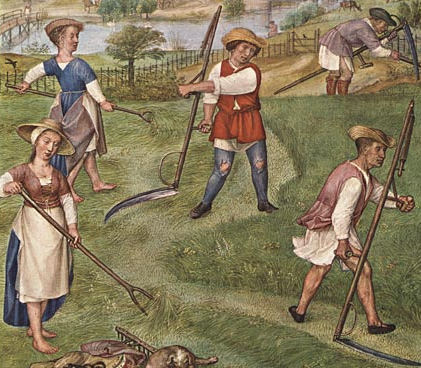
3 – c. 1510

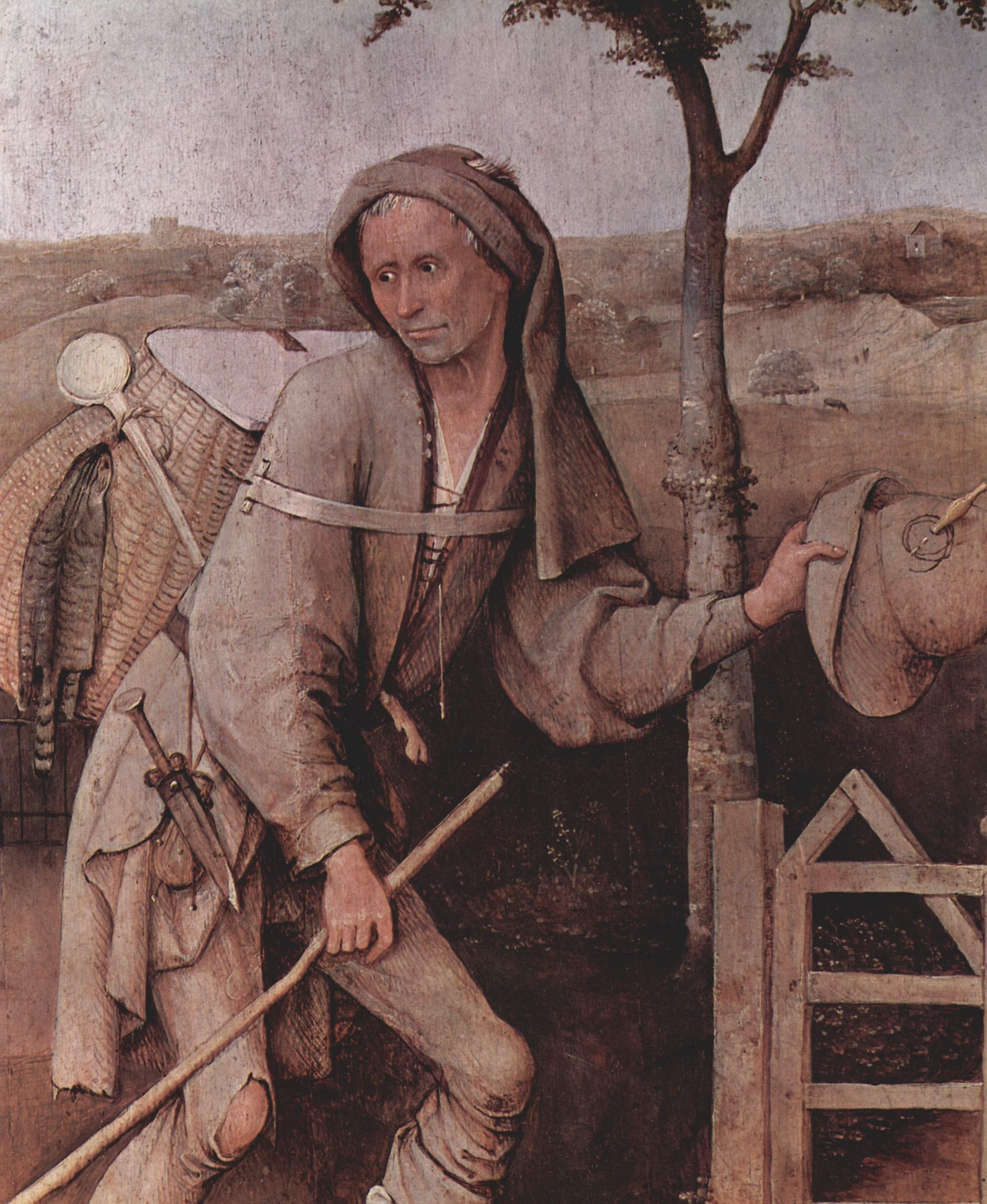
4 – c. 1510

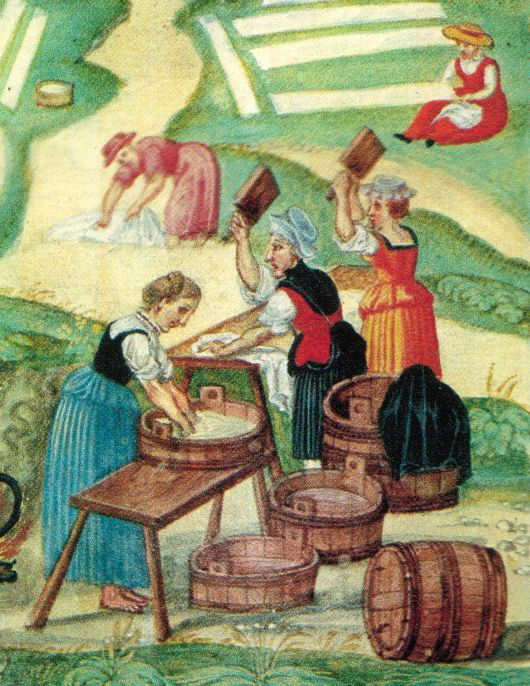
5 – 1531
1. Bavarian stonemasons wear knee-length tunics, hose, and ankle-high shoes, c. 1505.
2. Sheep shearers wear short tunics over shirts, with hose and ankle-high shoes, Flanders, c. 1510.
3. Haymakers: Barefoot women wear short-sleeved, front-laced gowns with contrasting linings tucked up over knee-length chemises, with aprons and straw hats. Men wear sleeveless overgowns or jerkins over their shirts and hose, c. 1510.
4. The prodigal son is dressed like a beggar, in undyed or faded clothing. He wears a hood and carries a hat with a brim and a wicker pack on his back, c. 1510.
5. The great washing day showing barefoot women with their sleeves rolled up doing laundry, 1531

== See also ==
- Chemise
- Kirtle
- Doublet (clothing)
- Farthingale
- French hood
- Gable hood
- Hose (clothing)
- Jerkin (garment)
- Zibellino
