= Cornette =

Piece of female headwear

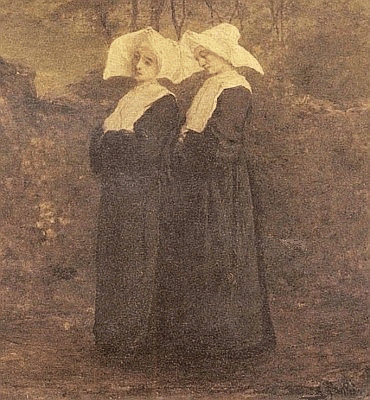
A painting of cornette-wearing Sisters of Charity by Armand Gautier (19th-century)

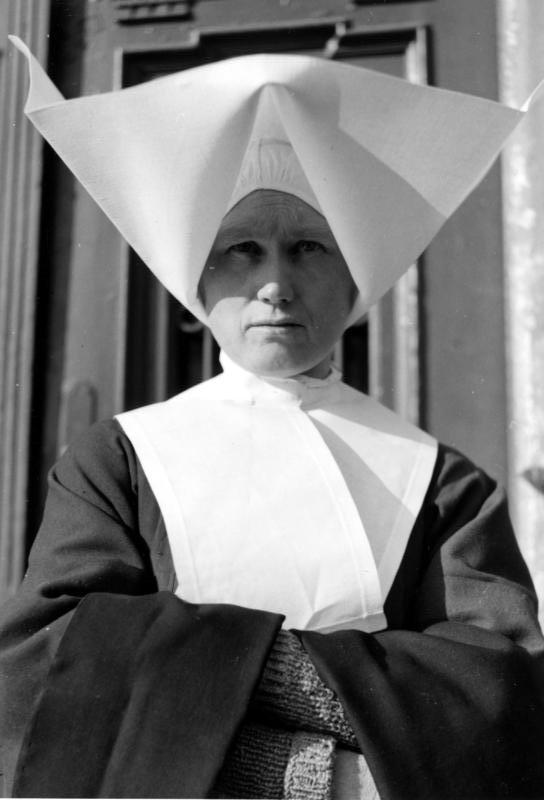
Religious sister in her habit with a white cornette, Krakow, 1939

A cornette is a piece of headwear for religious sisters. It is essentially a type of wimple consisting of a large starched piece of white cloth that is folded upward in such a way as to create the resemblance of horns (French: cornes) on the wearer's head. Initially, the cornette was fashionable for some Parisian ladies around 1800, wearing ones made of muslin or gauze and richly ornamented with lace.

== Use by the Daughters of Charity ==
The cornette was retained as a distinctive piece of clothing into modern times by the Daughters of Charity, a society of apostolic life founded by St. Vincent de Paul in the mid-17th century. The founder wanted to have a community of women that tended to the sick and poor, and were not required to remain in the papal enclosure as nuns do, resemble ordinary middle-class women as much as possible in their clothing, including the wearing of the cornette.

After the cornette generally fell into disuse, it became a distinctive feature of the Daughters of Charity, making theirs one of the most widely recognized religious habits. Because of the cornette, they were known in Ireland as the "butterfly nuns". In the United States, the Daughters of Charity wore wide, white cornettes for 114 years, from 1850 to 1964. With the changes following the apostolic constitution Perfectae Caritatis on the adaptation and renewal of religious life of the Second Vatican Council, religious congregations were asked to "return to the sources of the whole of the Christian life and to the primitive inspiration of the institutes, and their adaptation to the changed conditions of our time". This, among others, meant that the Daughters of Charity ceased to wear their cornettes.

== In popular culture ==
Cornette-wearing nuns are common in contemporary films. The 1967 television series The Flying Nun features the American actress Sally Field as Sister Bertrille, who is able to fly due to her light weight and the heavily starched cornette.

== See also ==
- List of headgear
- Bandeau (headwear)
- Coif
- Guimpe
