= Jane the Quene =

2016 novel by Janet Wertman

- Author: Janet Wertman
- Series: Seymour Saga
- Genre: Historical fiction
- Published: 2016
- Followed by: The Path to Somerset (2018)

Jane the Quene is a 2016 historical fiction novel by Janet Wertman.

== Plot summary ==
The novel follows the life of Jane Seymour, an unassuming maid of honor to Queen Anne Boleyn. Jane becomes romantically involved with King Henry VIII, while political intrigues unfold surrounding her brother Edward Seymour, 1st Duke of Somerset and Thomas Cromwell.

== Reception ==
The book received positive reviews from critics, who praised its immediacy, complex characterization, and historical accuracy. It was included in Open Letters Monthly's "Best Books of 2016" list.
