= Weltman =

Weltman is a surname. Notable people with the surname include:

- Amanda Weltman (born 1979), South African theoretical physicist
- Harry Weltman (1933–2014), American basketball executive
- Jeff Weltman, American Basketball executive

== See also ==
- Wertman
