= The Boy King (novel) =

2020 novel by Janet Wertman

- Author: Janet Wertman
- Series: Seymour Saga
- Genre: Historical fiction
- Published: 2020
- Preceded by: The Path to Somerset (2018)

The Boy King is a 2020 historical fiction novel by Janet Wertman. It is the final book in the Seymour Saga trilogy.

== Plot summary ==
The book follows the nine year-old Edward Tudor, who is crowned King Edward VI upon the death of his father Henry VIII. As he comes of age, his reign is jeopardized by class conflicts within England, wars, and religious conflicts.

== Reception ==
The book received mostly positive reviews from critics, who praised its emotional stakes, characterization, and political drama. It was included in Open Letters Monthly's "Best Books of 2020 List".
