= Adlai =

Adlai may refer to:

- Adlai (biblical figure), the father of Shaphat, and the grandfather of the prophet Elisha
- Adlai (given name), a list of people with the given name Adlai
- Adlai, West Virginia, unincorporated community, United States

== See also ==
- Job's tears, a grain sometimes known as adlay or adlay millet
