= The Path to Somerset =

2018 book

- Author: Janet Wertman
- Series: Seymour Saga
- Genre: Historical fiction
- Published: 2018
- Preceded by: Jane the Quene (2016)
- Followed by: The Boy King (2020)

The Path to Somerset is a 2018 historical fiction novel by Janet Wertman.

== Plot summary ==
The book follows Edward Seymour, 1st Duke of Somerset in the wake of his sister Queen Jane Seymour's death. Edward attempts to outwit his political nemesis Stephen Gardiner, as his former brother-in-law Henry VIII's health declines.

== Reception ==
The book was praised by critics for its prose, historical detail and its portrayal of the rivalry between Edward and Stephen.
