= Janet Wertman =

American author

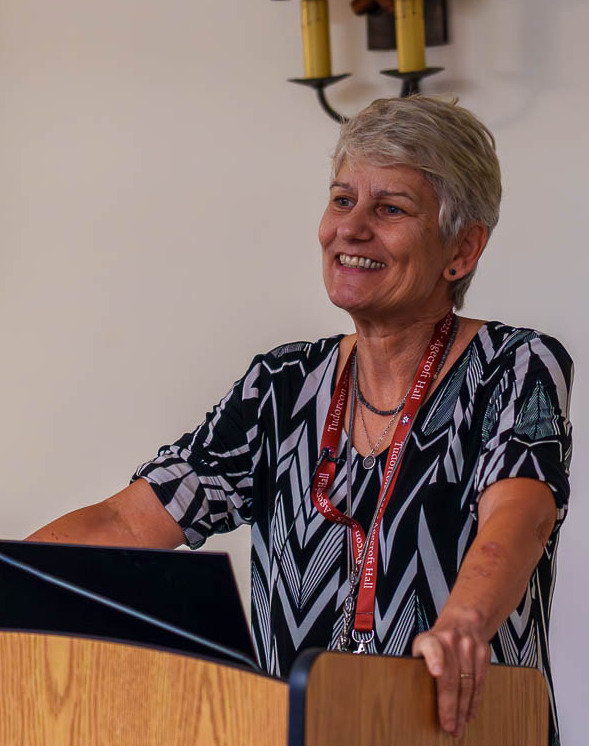
- Janet Wertman at Tudor Con 2025
- Occupation: Author of historical fiction
- Notable work: Seymour Saga (2016–2020); Regina trilogy (2025–ongoing)
- Spouse: Adlai Wertman
- Children: 3
- Website: janetwertman.com

Janet Wertman is American author. She has written Jane the Quene (2016), The Path to Somerset (2018), The Boy King (2020), and Nothing Proved (2025).

== Early life ==
Wertman became interested in the House of Tudor after watching The Six Wives of Henry VIII as a child, and she developed a love of historical fiction.

== Writing career ==
Wertman published Jane the Quene, a novel about Jane Seymour, in 2016. It is the first novel in the Seymour Saga trilogy. In 2018, she published a sequel, The Path to Somerset, which focuses on Jane Seymour's older brother Edward Seymour, 1st Duke of Somerset. The final novel in the trilogy, The Boy King, was published in 2020. It covers the reign of Jane Seymour and Henry VIII's son Edward VI.

In 2025, she published Nothing Proved, about the early life of Elizabeth Tudor. It is the first book in the Regina trilogy, about Elizabeth I's life.

== Personal life ==
Wertman formerly lived in New York City, where she worked as a corporate attorney and her husband Adlai Wertman was an investment banker. They later moved to Los Angeles with their three children, where Janet became a grant writer for nonprofits and Adlai became involved in nonprofit social entrepreneurship. After her grandfather's death, she inherited many of his books, including The Social History of Lighting, which she referenced when writing historical novels.
