= Jane Seymour =

Queen of England from 1536 to 1537

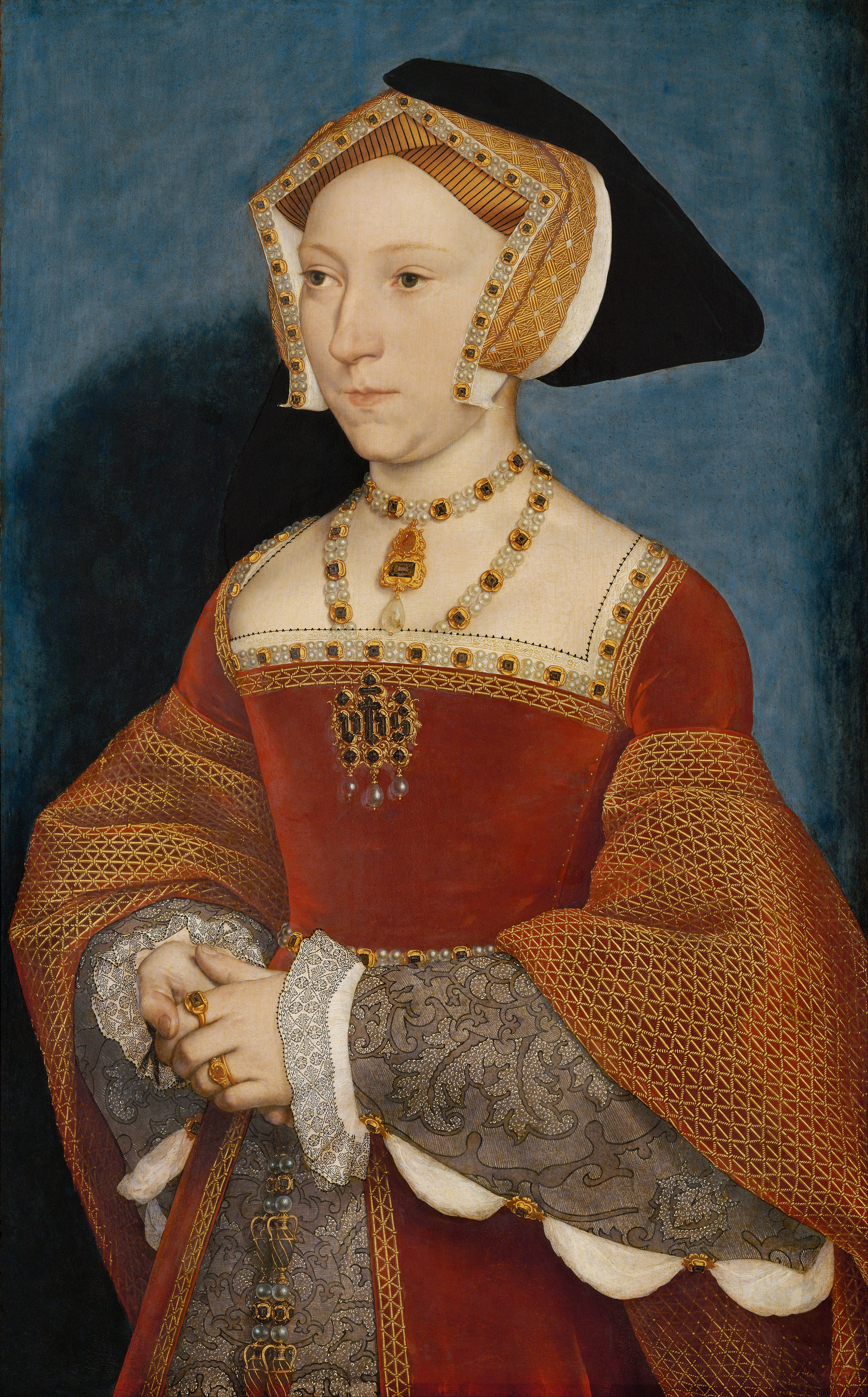
- Portrait c. 1536 – c. 1537

Queen consort of England
- Tenure: 30 May 1536 – 24 October 1537
- Born: c. 1508-1512/1513 probably Wulfhall, Wiltshire, England
- Died: 24 October 1537 (aged 24–29); Hampton Court Palace, England
- Burial: 12 November 1537; St George's Chapel, Windsor Castle, England
- Spouse: Henry VIII (m. 1536)
- Issue: Edward VI
- House: Seymour
- Father: Sir John Seymour
- Mother: Margery Wentworth
- Religion: Roman Catholicism

Jane Seymour (/ˈsiːmɔːr/; c. 1508 or 1512/1513 – 24 October 1537) was Queen of England as the third wife of King Henry VIII from 30 May 1536 until her death the next year. She became queen following the execution of Henry's second wife, Anne Boleyn, who was accused by Henry of adultery after failing to produce a male heir. Jane, however, died of postnatal complications less than two weeks after the birth of her only child, the future King Edward VI. She was the only wife of Henry VIII to receive a queen's funeral, and Henry was later buried alongside her remains in St George's Chapel, Windsor Castle.

== Early life ==
Jane, the daughter of Sir John Seymour and Margery Wentworth, was most likely born at Wulfhall, Wiltshire, although West Bower Manor in Somerset has also been suggested. Her birth date is not recorded; various accounts use anywhere from 1504 to 1509, however, Elizabeth Norton has presented new evidence that Jane may have been born as late as 1512–1513, making Jane younger than originally thought. Through her maternal grandfather, she was a descendant of King Edward III's son Lionel of Antwerp, 1st Duke of Clarence. Because of this, she and King Henry VIII were fifth cousins. She also shared a great-grandmother, Elizabeth Cheney, Lady Say, with his second and fifth wives, Anne Boleyn and Catherine Howard.

Jane was not as highly educated as Henry's first and second wives, Catherine of Aragon and Anne Boleyn. She could read and write a little but was much better at needlework and household management, which were considered much more necessary for women. Her needlework was reportedly beautiful and elaborate; some of it survived as late as 1652, when it is recorded to have been given to the Seymour family. After her death, it was noted that Henry was an "enthusiastic embroiderer".

Jane was praised for her gentle, peaceful nature, being called as "gentle a lady as ever I knew" by John Russell and "the Pacific" by the Imperial Ambassador Eustace Chapuys (who referred to her as Jane Semel in his letters), for her peacemaking efforts at court. According to Chapuys, she was of middling stature and very pale; he also said that she was not of much beauty, but Russell said she was "the fairest of all the King's wives". Polydore Vergil commented that she was "a woman of the utmost charm in both character and appearance". She was regarded as meek, gentle, simple, and chaste, with her large family making her thought to be suitable to have many children.

== Service in royal court ==
Although no original evidence of Jane's employment in the royal court survives, most historians agree that Jane arrived to serve as a lady-in-waiting for Queen Catherine between 1527 and 1529. In 1531, Henry VIII banished Catherine from court. Elizabeth Norton posits that Jane likely accompanied Catherine into exile. Alison Weir suggests Jane likely remained at the royal court and entered Anne's service instead.

A "Mistress Seymour" received a New Year's gift from Henry in January 1534, which may indicate that Jane was indeed part of Anne's retinue at this time. However, according to Jane Dormer's memoir, Jane Seymour's entry to Anne's retinue was arranged in late 1535 by courtier Francis Bryan, himself a relative of both Anne and Seymour. In July 1536, Holy Roman ambassador Pedro Ortiz wrote to Empress Isabella that his colleague, Eustace Chapuys, understood Jane to have previously served as a maid to both Catherine and Anne.

Anne became Henry's wife in January 1533 and Queen consort of England later that year, in June. After giving birth to a daughter, Elizabeth I, in September 1533, Anne suffered a series of miscarriages, and her relationship with Henry began to fail, in large part due to Henry's growing desperation for a male heir.

=== Visit to Wolf Hall and relationship with Henry: 1535–1536 ===
In late 1535, Henry VIII embarked on what would be his final royal tour with Anne. They stayed at Wolf Hall, the ancestral home of the Seymour family, for one week in September. Henry often visited the homes of his favoured courtiers during progresses, of which Jane Seymour's father was one.

Most historians agree that Jane was likely present during this visit, either to support her parents in providing hospitality to the royal couple or to attend to Queen Anne. Seymour was likely already acquainted with Henry in some personal capacity, due to her service in the royal court and Henry's dealings with the Seymour family. However, it is possible that Henry took a romantic interest in Jane for the first time during this visit.

By February 1536, Henry was, according to Eustace Chapuys, sending Jane gifts, indicating interest in her as a potential mistress. Upon receiving a letter and a purse full of sovereigns from the king, Jane returned the gift and the letter unopened. She asked the messenger, who may have been Richard Page, to tell Henry that "there was no treasure in this world that [Jane] valued as much as her honour," and to request that Henry reserve sending gifts "for such a time as God would be pleased to send [Jane] some advantageous marriage."

Both contemporaries and historians have posited that Jane was being coached by her family in her responses to Henry's attentions, with the ultimate goal of Jane usurping Anne as queen. Conservative members of the royal court, including Jane's brother Edward, certainly saw Jane supplanting Anne as a means to undo reformist policies associated with Anne's reign. Nonetheless, biographer Antonia Fraser posits that Jane's refusal may have been less strategic than practical: protecting her reputation meant protecting her future marriage prospects, as she lacked independent wealth and could not risk a scandalous association with the monarch.

Intrigued by Jane's apparent modesty, Henry's interest in her intensified. He arranged for Jane and her brother Edward to move into Thomas Cromwell's apartments at Greenwich Palace, so that Edward could act as Jane's chaperone while Henry continued to pursue her.

== Marriage and birth of heir ==
Henry VIII was betrothed to Jane on 20 May 1536, the day after Anne Boleyn's execution. They were married at the Palace of Whitehall, Whitehall, London, in the Queen's closet by Bishop Stephen Gardiner on 30 May 1536. As a wedding gift he granted her 104 manors in four counties as well as a number of forests and hunting chases for her jointure, the income to support her during their marriage. She was publicly proclaimed queen on 4 June 1536. Her well-publicised sympathy for the late Queen Catherine and her daughter Mary showed her to be compassionate and made her a popular figure with the common people and most of the courtiers. She was never crowned because of plague in London, where the coronation was to take place. Henry may have been reluctant to have her crowned before she had fulfilled her duty as a queen consort by bearing him a male heir.

As queen, Jane was observed by her court to be strict and formal. The lavish entertainments, gaiety, and extravagance of the queen's household, which had reached their peak during Anne Boleyn's time, were replaced by strict decorum. She banned the French fashions Anne had introduced. Politically, Jane was conservative. Her only reported involvement in national affairs, in 1536, was when she asked for pardons for participants in the Pilgrimage of Grace. Henry is said to have rejected this, reminding her of the fate her predecessor met should she "meddle with his affairs." Her motto as a queen was Bound to obey and serve.

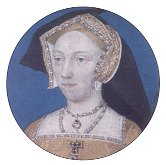
Lucas Horenbout miniature of Jane Seymour

Jane formed a close relationship with her stepdaughter Mary, making efforts to have Mary restored to court and to the royal succession, behind any children she might have with Henry. She brought up the issue of Mary's restoration both before and after she became queen. While she was unable to restore Mary to the line of succession, she was able to reconcile her with Henry. Chapuys wrote to Emperor Charles V of her compassion and efforts on behalf of Mary's return to favour. A letter from Mary to her shows Mary's gratitude. While it was she who first pushed for the restoration, Mary and Elizabeth were not reinstated to the succession until Henry's sixth wife, Catherine Parr, convinced him to do so.

Jane has been described as a “highly efficient administrator of her jointure”. She took an active role in managing her estates, overseeing rents, leases and revenues to maintain their profitability. Norton characterises her as an “astute, if sometimes harsh, businesswoman”, highlighting her approach to financial management. For example, she granted new leases to tenants in exchange for entry fines and consistently ensured that these payments were made. This distinguished her from her predecessor, who had not always enforced such payments. Her careful supervision and financial prudence enabled her to die debt-free, unlike her predecessors. Norton suggests that her financial discipline may have been influenced by her relatively modest upbringing.

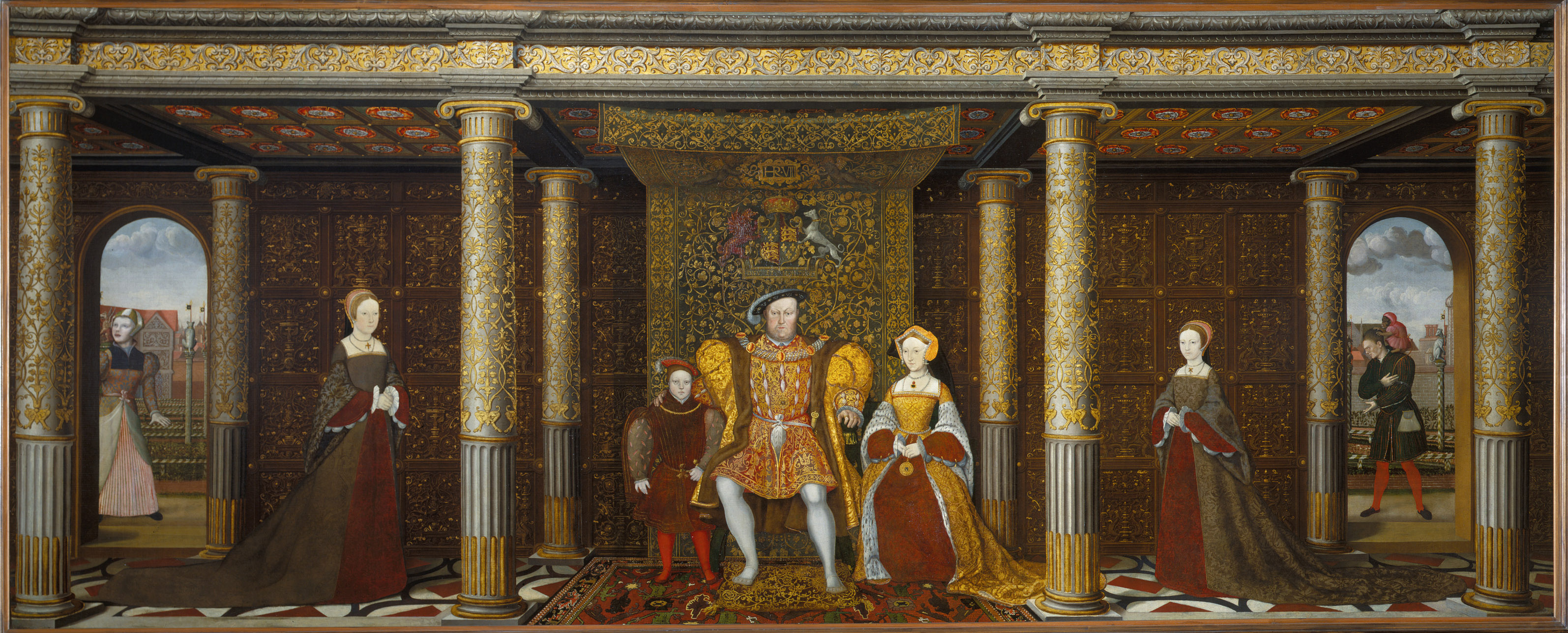
Henry VIII's family portrait

One non-contemporary source conjectures that she may have been pregnant and had a miscarriage by Christmas 1536. In January 1537, Jane conceived again.

During her pregnancy, she developed a craving for quail. Henry had an uncle and aunt in Calais, the Viscount and Viscountess Lisle; quails were abundant in the marshes around where the couple lived, and they were also able to source the birds from Flanders. In May, Henry instructed John Russell to contact the Lisles: "My lord, the king commanded me to write to you for some fat quails, for the queen is very desirous to eat some but here be none to be gotten. [I] pray you... will send some with as much speed as may be possible, but they must be very fat." The Lisles obliged.

During the summer, Jane took no public engagements and led a relatively quiet life, attended by the royal physicians and the best midwives in the kingdom. She went into confinement in September 1537 and gave birth to the coveted male heir, the future King Edward VI, at two o'clock in the morning on 12 October 1537 at Hampton Court Palace. Edward was christened on 15 October 1537 without his parents in attendance, as was the custom. He was the only legitimate son of Henry VIII to survive infancy. Both of Henry's daughters, Mary and Elizabeth, were present and carried Edward's train during the ceremony.

== Death and funeral ==
A painting from 1847 by French artist, Eugène Devéria (1808-1865) depicting the tragic death of Jane.

Jane's labour had been difficult, lasting two days and three nights, probably because the baby was not well positioned. After the christening, it became clear that she was seriously ill. She died on 24 October 1537 at Hampton Court Palace. Within a few weeks, there were conflicting accounts of the cause of her death. According to King Edward's biographer Jennifer Loach, her death may have been due to an infection from a retained placenta. According to Alison Weir, she may have succumbed to puerperal fever following a bacterial infection contracted during the birth. Weir has also speculated, after medical consultation, that the cause of her death may have been a pulmonary embolism.

Jane was buried on 12 November in St. George's Chapel, Windsor Castle after the funeral in which her stepdaughter Mary acted as chief mourner. A large procession, on horseback or in litters, elaborately accoutred with canopies and banners, followed Mary in the funeral cortège. The mourners included nobles, courtiers, ambassadors and bishops, with their entourages. She was the only one of Henry's wives to receive a queen's funeral.

After her death, Henry wore black for the next three months. He married Anne of Cleves two years later, although marriage negotiations were tentatively begun soon after Jane's death. He gained weight during his widowerhood, becoming obese and swollen and developing diabetes and gout. When he died in 1547, he was buried beside her, on his request, in the grave he had made for her.

== Legacy ==
Jane gave the king the son he so desperately desired, helped to restore Mary to the succession and her father's affections, ensuring that both her husband and stepdaughter felt tremendously bereft after her death. She used her influence to bring about the advancement of her family, which had been hindered by the scandal of her father's affair with his daughter-in-law, Catherine Filliol. Two of her brothers, Thomas and Edward, used her memory to improve their own fortunes. Thomas was rumoured to have been pursuing the future Elizabeth I, but he married the queen dowager Catherine Parr instead. In the reign of the young King Edward VI, Edward Seymour set himself up as Lord Protector and de facto ruler of the kingdom. Both brothers eventually fell from power and were executed.

== Costume ==
Lady Margery Lyster was in charge of the jewels of Jane Seymour. An inventory was made of the queen's beads, jewels, pomanders, tablets, girdles, borders, brooches, bracelets, buttons, aglets, and chains. Many of the pieces were gold decorated with enamel and some were set with gems.

An inventory of Henry VIII includes costume belonging to Jane Seymour, which was stored in 1542 in the Old Jewel House of Whitehall Palace. The list includes: gowns of damask, velvet, and satin; kirtles of velvet, cloth of silver, taffeta, and purple cloth of gold; cloaks of satin; sleeves of silver and gold tissue embroidered with Venice gold and tied with gold aglets; placards for gowns; stomachers; frontlets; French hoods and billiments of black velvet and white satin; partlets; and crimson velvet hats. The same clothes were listed again in 1547.

Jane Seymour was said to have embroidered a bed and a chair, later given by Charles I to her relation William Seymour. Included in the 1542 inventory are some items of embroidery, possibly her own work such as a cushion featuring an antelope. A piece with a branch of roses and a crowned white falcon seems to be an emblem associated with Anne Boleyn. Jane Seymour owned great and little "babies", dolls dressed in gowns of cloth of silver, satin, and velvet tied with gold "aglettes", like her own sleeves. These may have been fashion dolls.

Jane Seymour's arms as queen consort

Phoenix and Castle badge used by Jane Seymour

== In media ==
=== On film ===
- In 1933, Wendy Barrie played Seymour opposite Charles Laughton's Henry VIII in Alexander Korda's highly acclaimed film The Private Life of Henry VIII.
- In 1969, Lesley Paterson portrayed Jane briefly in Anne of the Thousand Days.
- In 1972, the film Henry VIII and His Six Wives was released, adapted from the BBC series, in which Keith Michell reprised his role as Henry; on this occasion Seymour was played by Jane Asher.
- Corinne Galloway depicts Seymour in The Other Boleyn Girl (2008).

=== On TV ===
- As part of the 1970 BBC series The Six Wives of Henry VIII, Henry was played by Keith Michell, and Seymour by Anne Stallybrass.
- Seymour is a supporting character in the 2003 BBC television drama The Other Boleyn Girl, played by Naomi Benson opposite Jared Harris as Henry VIII and Jodhi May as Anne Boleyn.
- In October 2003, in the two-part ITV drama Henry VIII, Ray Winstone starred as the King. Jane Seymour was played by Emilia Fox.
- In The Simpsons 2004 episode "Margical History Tour", Seymour is portrayed by the shrill Miss Springfield during Marge's retelling of Henry's reign. Henry (portrayed by Homer) quickly orders Seymour's beheading after hearing her annoying voice.
- Anita Briem portrayed Seymour as lady-in-waiting to Anne Boleyn in the second (2008) season of the television series The Tudors, produced for Showtime. In the third season of the same series, when Jane Seymour becomes queen and later dies, the part is played by Annabelle Wallis.
- Kate Phillips, in her first professional role, plays Jane Seymour in the BBC Two adaptation of Wolf Hall. Phillips reprises the role in the sequel Wolf Hall: The Mirror and the Light.

=== In documentaries ===
- Seymour was played by Charlotte Roach in David Starkey's documentary series The Six Wives of Henry VIII in 2001.
- Lucy Telleck played Seymour opposite Charlie Clements as Henry VIII in Suzannah Lipscomb's and Dan Jones' Henry VIII and his Six Wives on Channel 5.

=== On stage ===
- Jane Seymour is portrayed in the stage adaptation of Hilary Mantel's Wolf Hall parts I and II, adapted by Mike Poulton. It was presented by the Royal Shakespeare Company in London's West End (2014) and on Broadway (2015).
- In the musical Six, she was played by Holly Musgrave in the original Edinburgh cast, Natalie Paris in the studio and West End casts and Abby Mueller in the Chicago cast.

=== In books ===
- Is the main character in Janet Wertman's Jane the Quene novel, the first installment in her Seymour Saga.
- Is the main character in Carolly Erickson's highly fictionalized novel The Favoured Queen, which follows her from her appointment as lady-in-waiting to Catherine of Aragon right up until her death.
- Is the subject of the novel Plain Jane: A Novel of Jane Seymour (Tudor Women Series) by Laurien Gardner (Sarah Hoyt).
- Appears as a lady serving both Catherine of Aragon and Anne Boleyn in Wolf Hall by Hilary Mantel, which ends with hints of her coming prominence. The second novel in Mantel's series, Bring Up the Bodies focuses on the machinations that led to the execution of Anne Boleyn, Henry VIII's growing determination to replace her with Jane Seymour and the Seymour family's stratagems to gain from the King's attraction to Jane. The third volume, The Mirror & the Light, includes Jane Seymour's story.
- The book I, Jane, by Diane Haeger, tells of her growing up and, before catching the eye of King Henry, meeting a young man whose parents are well placed in court and look down on Jane and her family. Despite this, Jane and the son become close, and over the years she never forgets him.
- Is the title character of Jane Seymour: Henry VIII's True Love by Elizabeth Norton.
- Seymour is the title character in Alison Weir's book Jane Seymour: The Haunted Queen, the third in the Six Tudor Queens series.

=== In music ===
- As Giovanna Seymour, she appears in Gaetano Donizetti's opera Anna Bolena.
- Rick Wakeman recorded the piece "Jane Seymour" for his 1973 album The Six Wives of Henry VIII.
- The English ballad "The Death of Queen Jane" (Child No. 170) is about the death of Jane Seymour following the birth of Prince Edward. The story as related in the ballad is historically inaccurate, but apparently reflects the popular view at the time of the events surrounding her death. The historical fact is that Prince Edward was born naturally, and that his mother succumbed to infection and died 12 days later. Most versions of the song end with the contrast between the joy of the birth of the Prince and the grief of the death of the Queen.

== Sources ==
- Boutell, Charles (1863). A Manual of Heraldry, Historical and Popular. London: Winsor & Newton.
- Brown, Meg Lota; McBride, Kari Boyd (2005). Women's roles in the Renaissance. Westport: Greenwood Press. ISBN 978-0313322105.
- Farquhar, Michael (2001). A Treasure of Royal Scandals. New York: Penguin Books. ISBN 978-0-7394-2025-6.
- Fraser, Antonia (1993). The Six Wives of Henry VIII. Mandarin. ISBN 978-0-7493-1409-5.
- Lancelot, Francis (2011). Jane Seymour, Third Wife of Henry the Eighth: A Short Biography. Shamrock Publishing.
- Lipscomb, Suzannah (2012). 1536: The Year that Changed Henry VIII. Lion Books. ISBN 9780745959030.
- Norton, Elizabeth (2009). Jane Seymour: Henry VIII's True Love (hardback). Chalford: Amberley Publishing. ISBN 9781848681026.
- Seal, Graham (2001). Encyclopedia of Folk Heroes (hardback). Oxford: ABC-CLIO. p. 129. ISBN 9781576072165.
- Starkey, David (2003). Six Wives the Queens of Henry VIII. London: Chatto and Windus. ISBN 0-701-17298-3.
- Vergil, Polydore (1950). Hay, Denys (ed.). The Anglica historia of Polydore Vergil, A.D. 1485–1537. Edited with a translation by Denys Hay. Camden third series. Vol. 74. Royal Historical Society. p. 337.
- Wagner, John A.; Schmid, Susan Walters, eds. (2012). Encyclopedia of Tudor England (hardback). Vol. 3. Santa Barbara: ABC-CLIO. ISBN 9781598842982.
- Walder, John (1973). All Colour book of Henry VIII. London: Octopus Books. ISBN 978-0706402322.
- Walsh, Andrew (21 March 2009). "The death of Jane Seymour – a Midwife's view". Tudor Stuff: Tudor History From the Heart of England. Tudorstuff.wordpress.com.
- Weir, Alison (2007). The Six Wives of Henry VIII. London: Vintage. ISBN 9780099523628.
- Weir, Alison (5 January 2010). The Lady in the Tower: The Fall of Anne Boleyn. Random House Publishing Group. ISBN 978-0-345-51978-8.

English royalty
Vacant Title last held by Anne Boleyn	Queen consort of England; Lady of Ireland; 30 May 1536 – 24 October 1537	Vacant Title next held by Anne of Cleves
