= Adlai (given name) =

- Gender: Male
- Language: English

Origin
- Language: Hebrew
- Origin: Adaliah
- Meaning: "God is just"

Adlai is a male given name of Hebrew origin meaning "God is just". Notable people with this name include:

- Adlai H. Gilkeson (1893–1959), American brigadier general
- Adlai Osborne (1744–1814), North Carolina delegate to the Continental Congress
- Adlai Stevenson I (1835–1914), Grover Cleveland's Vice President
- Adlai Stevenson II (1900–1965), grandson of the above entry, former Governor of Illinois, and unsuccessful Presidential candidate
- Adlai Stevenson III (1930–2021), son of the above entry, and former Senator from Illinois
- Adlai Wertman (born 1959), Professor of Social Entrepreneurship at the University of Southern California

== See also ==
- Adlai (disambiguation)
