= Coif =

Historical headgear, a close-fitting cap

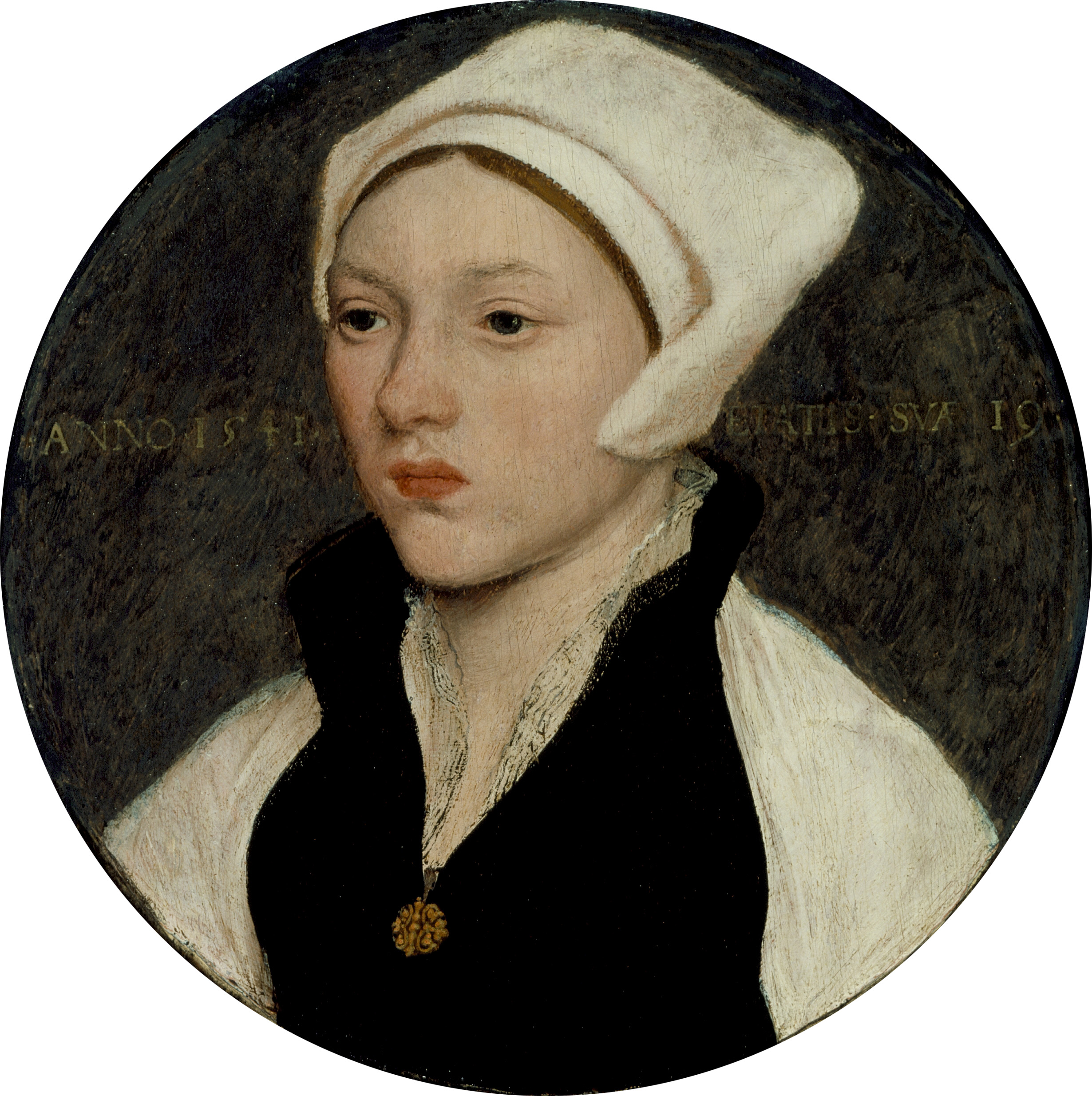
Young Woman with a White Coif by Hans Holbein the Younger, 1541

A coif (/kɔɪf/) is a close fitting headdress or cap worn by both men and women that covers the top, back, and sides of the head.

== History ==
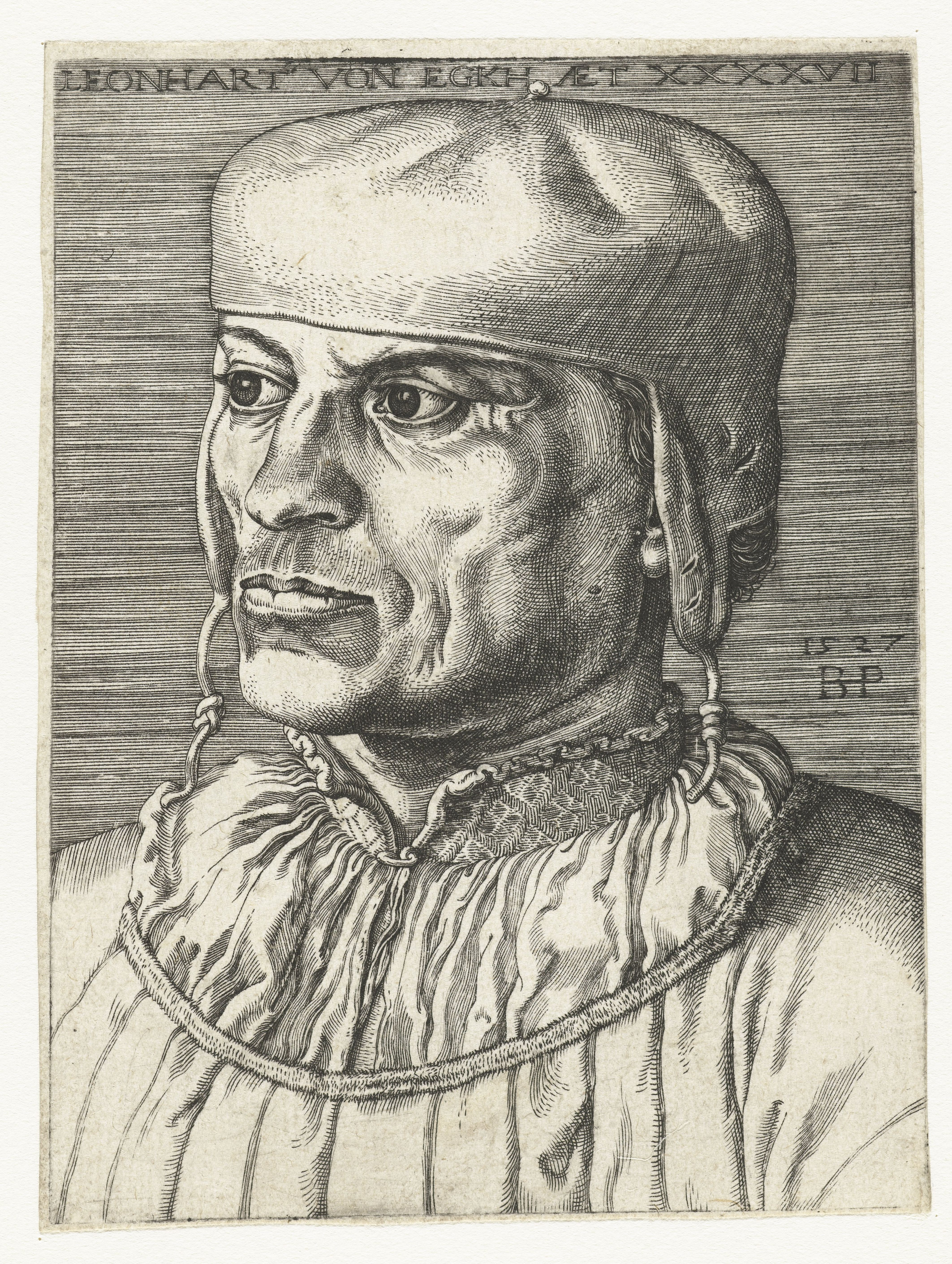
Dr. Leonhard von Eck (1480–1550) wearing a coif

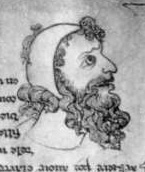
Medieval coif as worn by Aaron of Sur

Coifs date from the tenth century, but fell out of popularity with men in the fourteenth century. Coifs were worn by all classes in England and Scotland from the Middle Ages to the early seventeenth century (and later as an old-fashioned cap for countrywomen and young children).

Tudor (later Stewart in Scotland) and earlier coifs are usually made of unadorned white linen and tied under the chin. In the Elizabethan and early Jacobean eras, coifs were frequently decorated with blackwork embroidery and lace edging. Coifs were worn under gable hoods and hats of all sorts, and alone as indoor headcoverings.

Coifs were also worn by a now-defunct senior grade of English lawyer, the Serjeant-at-Law even after they became judges. A United States law school honor society is called the Order of the Coif.

The traditional religious habit of Catholic nuns and religious sisters includes a coif as a headpiece, along with the white cotton cap secured by a bandeau, to which the veil is attached, along with a white wimple or guimpe of starched linen or cotton to cover the cheeks, neck and chest.

A mail coif was a type of armour, made of mail, which covered the head (face excluded), neck and shoulders.

== See also ==
- Chullo – a knitted cap with ear flaps from the Andes
- 1500–1550 in fashion
- 1550–1600 in fashion
