= Pelican Portrait =

Portrait of Elizabeth I by Nicholas Hilliard

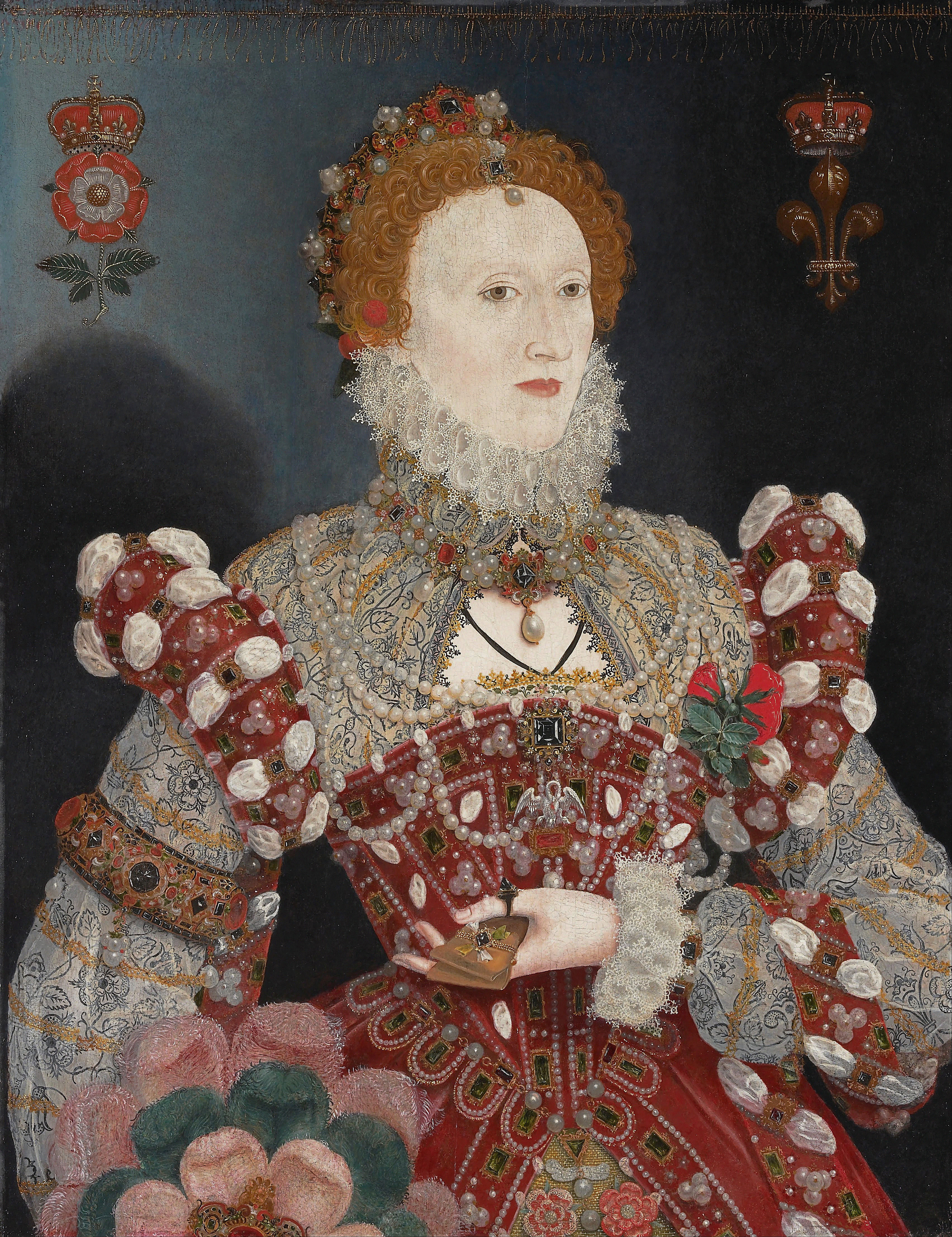
- Artist: Nicholas Hilliard
- Year: 1575
- Medium: Oil on wood panels
- Subject: Elizabeth I of England
- Location: Walker Art Gallery, Liverpool

The Pelican Portrait is an oil painting of Queen Elizabeth I of England on a wood panel, named for the pelican pendant shown on Elizabeth's breast. It is generally attributed to Nicholas Hilliard, on the basis of a scientific study and similarities to his other work.

Dating from about 1575, for many generations the painting was at Charlton House, Wiltshire, in the possession of the Earls of Suffolk. In 1930 it was sold to E. Peter Jones, who later donated it to the Walker Art Gallery, Liverpool.

== Features ==
The work was painted around 1575, when Queen Elizabeth was about forty-two. Its name comes from a rich jewel shown on her breast: a pendant in the form of a pelican in her piety. The female pelican was then believed to feed its young with blood from its own body, and the one in the pendant has its wings outstretched and is pecking its breast. This is taken as an allusion to Elizabeth as a self-sacrificing mother of the English nation, and the Queen was herself fond of the symbolism of the pelican. A pelican jewel was recorded in one of Elizabeth's inventories, as a "jewell of golde like a Pellican garnished with diamondes of sondrie sortes and bigness, under her feete three rubies and a triangle diamond".

In the portrait Elizabeth is magnificently dressed and is wearing other elaborate jewellery. On her right upper arm is a decorated armlet. Her headdress and velvet gown are richly bejewelled, especially with large pearls, which are a symbol of chastity and link the Queen to Artemis, the goddess of the Moon and chastity in Greek mythology. Two cherries on her right ear may also allude to her as a virgin Queen. The fringe of a canopy above her head hints at a throne room. A Tudor rose celebrates her dynasty, while a fleur-de-lis asserts her claim to the throne of France. The Queen's partlet and sleeves are blackwork of Tudor roses, embroidered on white cloth in black thread.

== Artist ==
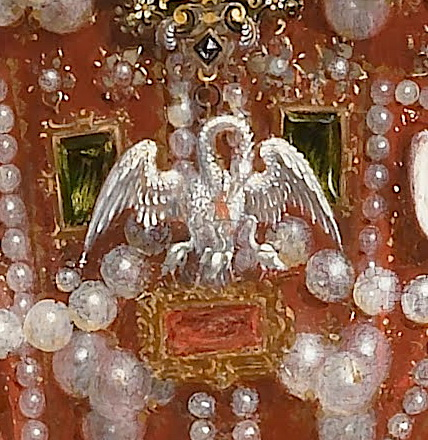
Detail with pendant

The attribution to Nicholas Hilliard (c. 1547–1619) is uncertain, though some writers have found the case for Hilliard as the artist so convincing that they state him as the painter without reservation.

Hilliard painted Elizabeth from life over many years from the early 1570s on and came nearest to being her appointed court painter. He was instrumental in building the Queen's image as an icon of virtue and splendour. Best known for his miniatures, Hilliard is also known to have painted some larger portraits, such as this.

The portrait has been compared in particular to one of Hilliard's known miniatures of the Queen. In his essay The Art of Limning he noted that the Queen sat for him in "the open alley of a goodly garden". She liked to be painted outdoors, as there was less effect from shadows.

== Technical analysis ==
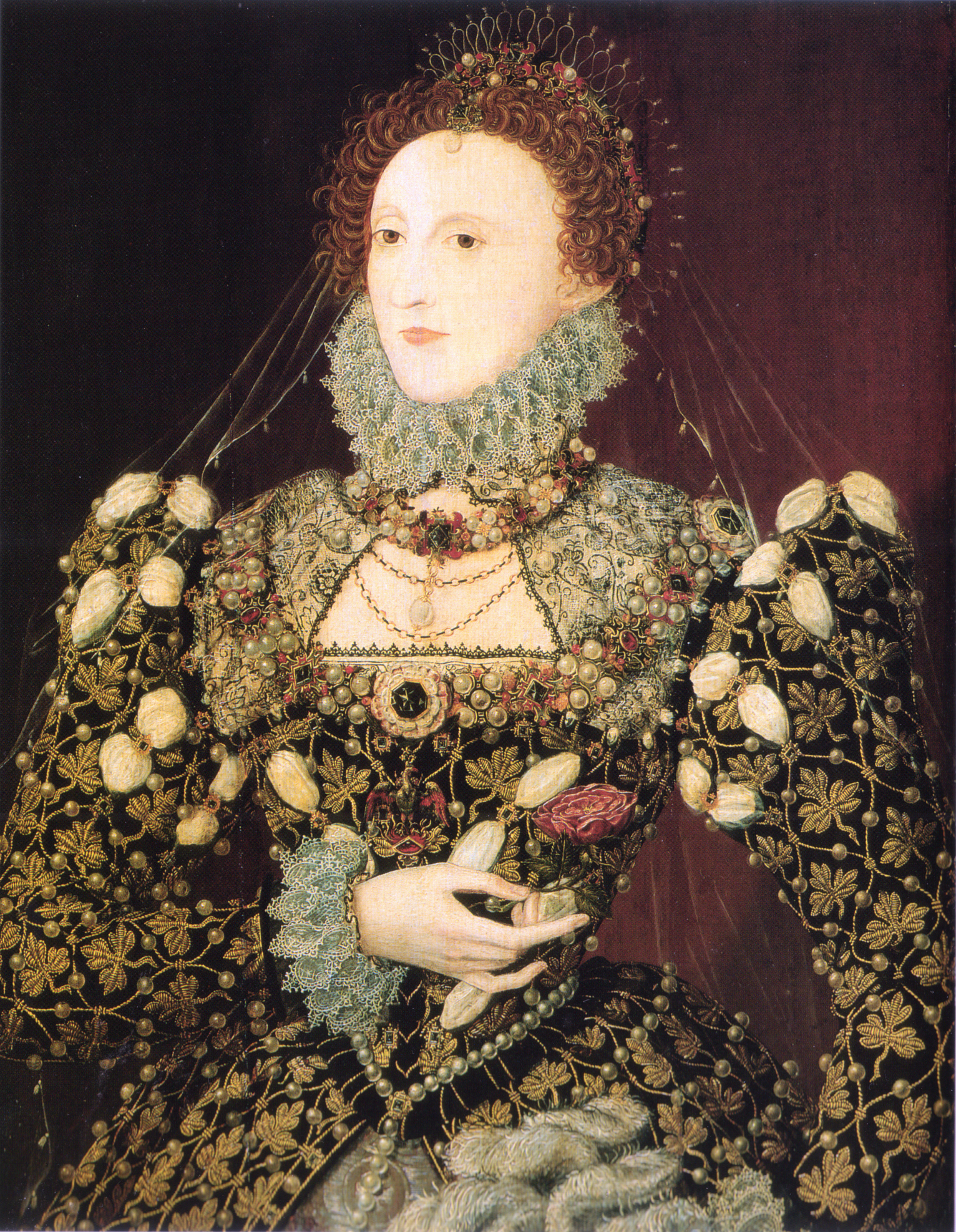
The "Phoenix Portrait"

A technical analysis of the painting alongside another of the Queen from the same period, known as the Phoenix Portrait, was carried out in September 2010 and concluded that they came from the same workshop. The wooden panels on which they are painted were made from the same two oak trees, and the two face patterns match exactly in mirror image.

The analysis discovered that the mouth, nose, and eyes of the Phoenix portrait have been altered and were first painted a little lower within the outline of the face, and the present blue-tinted background of the Pelican portrait was earlier than a purple one which had been painted on top of it, but had been removed.

== History ==
In 1801, the portrait was recorded at Charlton House, in Wiltshire, in the possession of John Howard, 15th Earl of Suffolk, and there was an unreliable Howard family tradition that Queen Elizabeth had given it to his family. It passed by descent through the Earls of Suffolk to Margaret Howard, Countess of Suffolk, who in 1930 sold it to Spink & Son for a collector, Alderman E. Peter Jones. He gave it to the Walker Art Gallery, Liverpool, in 1945. Jones, of Chester, had been managing director of the Mersey Ironworks Company and a Liberal parliamentary candidate.

== See also ==
- Portraiture of Elizabeth I
