= Dickey (garment) =

False shirt-front

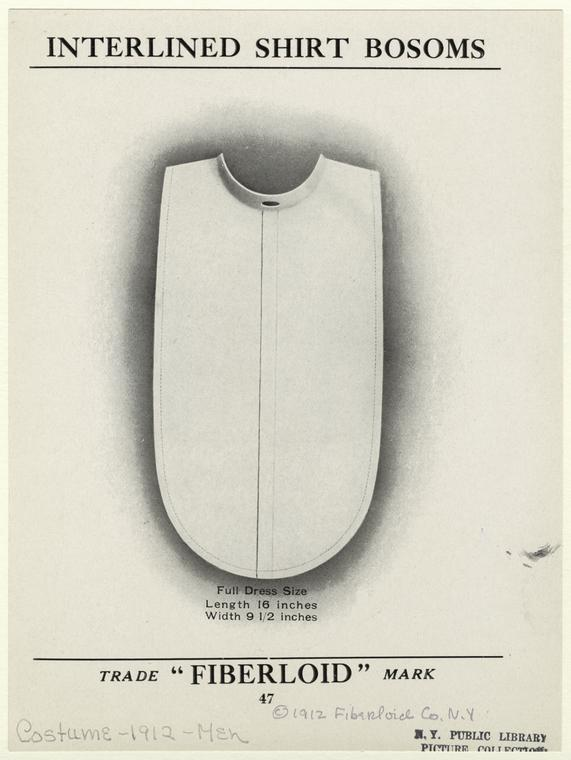
An advertisement for an interlined shirt-bosom (dickey) made of Fiberloid, a trademarked plastic material. (1912)

A dickey (also dickie and dicky, and tuxedo front in the U.S.) is a type of shirtfront that is worn with black tie (tuxedo) and with white tie evening clothes. The dickey is usually attached to the shirt collar and then tucked into the waistcoat or cummerbund. Some dickey designs have a trouser-button tab, meant to secure the dickey-bottom to the waistband of the trousers, and so prevent the dickey from becoming untucked.

The rigid dickey shirtfront, a bosom-front for a dress shirt and originally called the detachable bosom, was one of the first successful, commercial applications of celluloid. Like the detachable shirt collar, it was invented as a separate accessory for the shirt, which thus could be washed, starched, and pressed more readily than could be if the dickey were an integral part of the shirt.

Among dandies, the use of a dickey is considered bad style in the wearing of traditional modes of black tie and white tie evening dress. Etymologically, the word dickey is from Cockney rhyming slang, wherein dicky dirt denotes a shirt. In 1850s Britain, office workers wore business suits, yet their low wages disallowed a work week's supply of laundered shirts, so they adopted the dickey as a practical extension of the sartorial life of a dress shirt at work.

== Types ==
=== Celluloid (hard plastic) ===
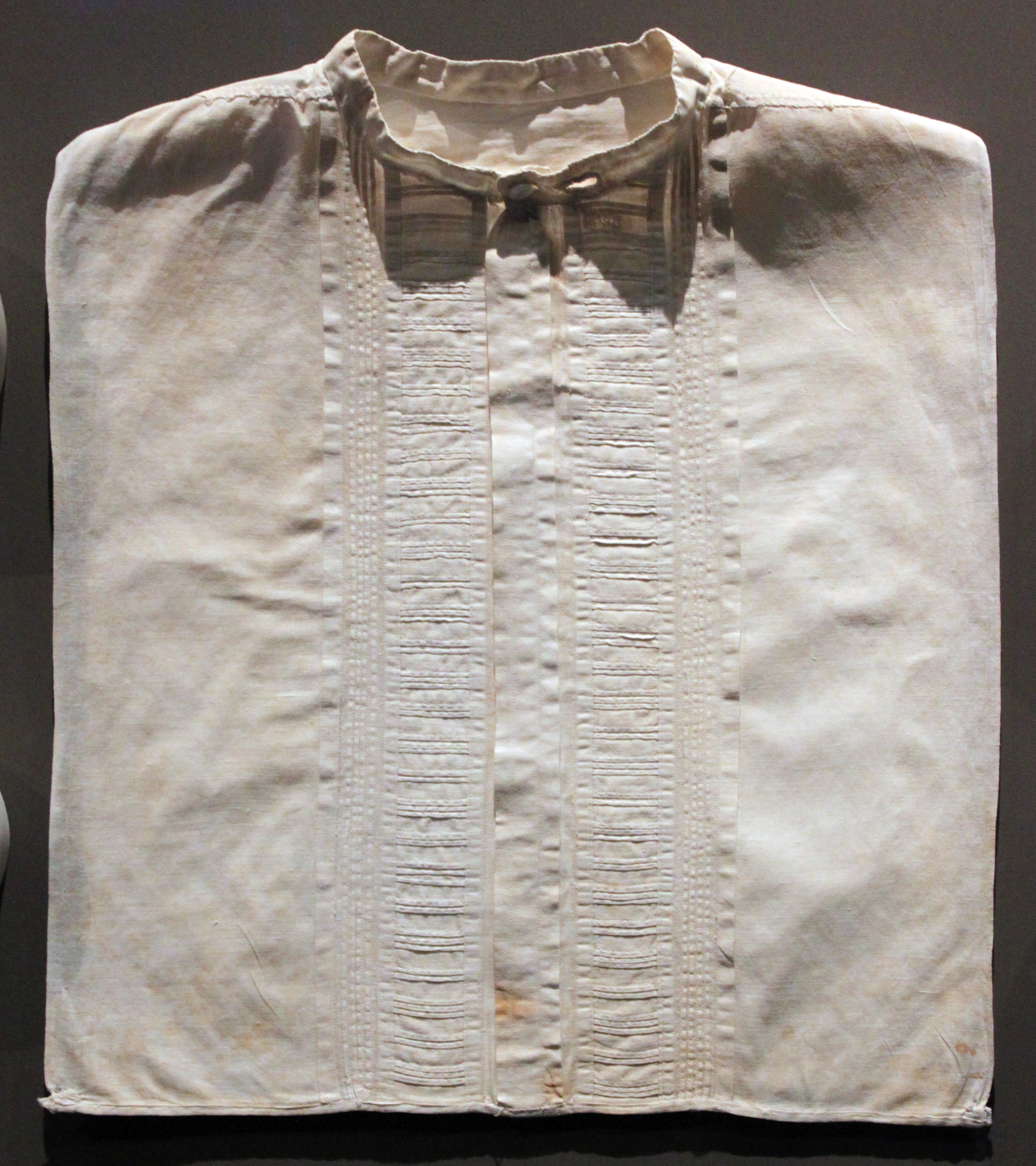
A dickey with a placket of ruffles and pleats, and a low band-collar. (1915)

Celluloid dickeys were popular for their waterproof and stain-resistant properties. Unlike traditional cloth shirt-fronts, they remained sleek, bright white, and did not wilt or wrinkle. Celluloid dickeys simulated the look of a formal shirt bib for day and evening wear. They were designed in a variety of patterns, such as: rounded, flat-end, no restraints, a restraint tab at the end of the bib or side straps that tied at the wearer's back. For this reason, they were popular with entertainers, musicians, and other performers. Nevertheless, they were frequently maligned and spoofed for their stiffness, un-manageability, and tendency to pop out of place. "The flapping dickey", a famous Vaudeville cliché, involves a dickey which has been intentionally rigged to flap in a comical fashion. For example, in the Looney Tunes cartoon Long-Haired Hare, orchestra conductor Bugs Bunny conducts an arrogant opera singer and makes him hold a note so long that his dickey snaps out of his waistcoat and rolls up to his throat.

=== Cardboard ===
Cardboard dickeys were worn in theater and service professions to save money from using linen formal shirts for uniforms. Examples of professions that used cardboard dickeys include waiters, hotel managers, doormen, bellboys, limo drivers, and servants.

=== Cloth ===
Cloth dickeys simulate many different styles. Some often-seen examples include dress shirt front and collar, formal frilled shirt front (popular in the mid-1970s with powder blue tuxedos), and most commonly in modern times, false turtleneck sweater fronts. Cloth dickeys are also often used in marching band uniforms.

Hard plastic dickeys have long since gone out of manufacture and fashion, but cloth turtleneck-style dickeys are still sometimes seen. Navy or black dickeys are common garments in many law enforcement agencies in the United States. Many law enforcement agencies require officers to wear either a tie or a mock turtleneck with their long sleeve or winter uniform. Many officers instead elect to use dickeys to give the appearance of a mock turtleneck being worn.

== Women’s wear ==
The dickey, traditionally worn by men, made the transition to women's wear around 1943. While women may have worn dickeys before this time, ads in Vogue New York can be seen promoting dickeys in the February 1943 issue. Dickeys were said to “enliven your new suit or rejuvenate your old”. Women's dickeys were made from cotton or rayon and embellished with embroidery, lace, jabots, and ruffles. They were priced between $2 and $3 at the time.

Patterns for women's dickeys can also be found dating to 1944, with Butterick's patterns providing eight variations on the dickey. While dickeys have gone in and out of style over time, they have made a resurgence in the fashion world, with the most recent one starting in 2015.

== Contemporary fashion ==
Starting in the 2010s, dickeys have been rising in popularity. In 2011, dickeys and menswear-inspired lingerie became popular as a break from minimalist and restrictive fashion at the time. At the same time, detachable collars and dickeys were showing up on the runway as Peter Pan collars. In 2013, the materials used for dickies was expanding from knits and cotton, to leather and silk. The 2014 fall winter season saw the dickey return as a winter accessory used to keep the neck warm. By 2015, contemporary designers, like Michael Kors, adopted the dickey in his resort line. In an interview with InStyle magazine, Kors said the dickey was a way to add versatility to a look, without adding bulk.

The rise of the dickey in pop culture has also encouraged the rise in popularity. For example, on the TV series The Big Bang Theory, a dickey is worn by the character Howard Wolowitz, as well as in Dinner for Schmucks, where the character Therman Murch (played by Zach Galifianakis) wore an orange turtleneck dickey. In 2012, the character Liz Lemon wore a "sweater" type dickey on the opening episode of season 6 on the TV series 30 Rock.

Appearances in film also occurred in the 1980s, such as Cousin Eddie (played by Randy Quaid) in National Lampoon's Christmas Vacation (1989) who wore a dark-green turtleneck dickey underneath an ivory sweater, and the character Kent who wore a dickey in the end scenes of the 1985 movie Real Genius.

A form of a dickey, often called a rabat or stock, is still commonplace in the attire of some Christian clergy. It is worn either over a clerical shirt or another shirt and under a jacket.

== Cultural dress ==
The dickey is not just a facet of menswear clothing, it is also used in certain types of cultural dress.

=== Armenia ===
Historically, Armenian dress consisted of layers, a result of the variability of the weather, with short and hot summers and long and cold winters. Layers could be switched out easily when changes in the weather occurred. One component of this layering was a dicky style shirt that was heavily embroidered to cover the chest if the woman's outer dress was low cut.

=== Greece ===
It is traditional for Greek widows to wear black to signify their mourning. Historically, widows in certain regions of Greece, specifically Peloponnese and Euboea, "wore a plain white chemise and an unembroidered sigouni with a black dickey, black headscarf and black apron."

=== Sámi people ===
Both men and women of the Sámi culture of Northern Europe, particularly in the central and southern parts of the Sámi region, wear dickeys under certain tunic styles. The tunics often have a V-neck opening that the dicky is worn under. The dickeys are usually rectangular and are made from wool. Traditionally, women wear red wool while men wear blue. The dickey is usually decorated with reindeer skin around the edges and metallic thread and glass beads in the center. The purpose is for the dickey to be the focal point of the outfit.

== See also ==
- Chemisette
