= Order of the Coif =

American collegiate legal honor society

- Founded: 1902; 124 years ago University of Illinois College of Law
- Type: Honor
- Affiliation: Independent
- Former affiliation: ACHS
- Status: Active
- Emphasis: Law graduates
- Scope: National
- Colors: Maroon and Black
- Symbol: Serjeant-at-law with wig and coif
- Chapters: 87
- Members: 25,000 lifetime
- Headquarters: West Virginia University College of Law; 101 Law School Drive; Morgantown, West Virginia 26506; United States
- Website: orderofthecoif.org

The Order of the Coif (/ˈkɔɪf/) is an American honor society for law school graduates. The Order was founded in 1902 at the University of Illinois College of Law. The name is a reference to the ancient English order of trial lawyers, the serjeants-at-law, whose courtroom attire included a coif—a white lawn or silk skullcap, which came to be represented by a round piece of white lace worn on top of the advocate's wig. A student who earns a Juris Doctor degree and graduates in the top ten percent of their class is eligible for membership if the student's law school has a chapter of the Order.

== History ==
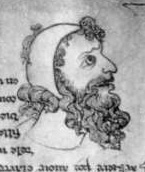
Medieval coif as worn by Aaron of Sur, 1500-1550

The University of Illinois College of Law established what would become the Order of the Coif in 1902. According to the organization's constitution, "The purpose of The Order is to encourage excellence in legal education by fostering a spirit of careful study, recognizing those who as law students attained a high grade of scholarship, and honoring those who as lawyers, judges and teachers attained high distinction for their scholarly or professional accomplishments."

In the late 19th century, several leading American law schools had established honors fraternities to recognize scholarship and distinction within the ranks of Juris Doctors in the United States. One of these, at the University of Illinois, was originally named Theta Kappa Nu. (Note: This name, briefly used by a few early chapters between 1902 and 1911 was retired after the growing fraternity determined in 1911 to adopt the earlier name that was used by its Northwestern chapter. Thus was created the American Order of the Coif. There is no connection between the legal honor society and a later developed national academic/social fraternity of the same name, Theta Kappa Nu, formed in 1924, which later would merge into Lambda Chi Alpha.) It inspired several additional chapters in Nebraska, Missouri, and Wisconsin. A local legal honor society had formed in 1907 at Northwestern University, adopting the name Order of the Coif, but three years later, in 1910, it would accept a charter from Theta Kappa Nu. Even with this charter, the Northwestern group retained use of the earlier name, which was one of the factors that necessitated a discussion and eventual negotiation of a merger, and not just an absorption.

Also, in 1910, chapters at Iowa and Michigan were formed. Rapid expansion and divergent practices at these early schools led to calls for a national convention. At this meeting, in 1911, it was determined to adopt the original name of the Northwestern group, the Order of the Coif, along with a revised constitution that was fully ratified in 1912. Thus the American Order of the Coif dates to its earliest group, in Illinois, from 1902, and adopted its name from both the Northwestern group and its institutional inspiration, the English Order.

By 1962, the society had 48 chapters and 13,061 living members. As of 2025, it has 87 chapters and 25,000 initiates. It is headquartered in Morgantown, West Virginia.

== Symbols ==
The symbolism of the Order of the Coif is far older, having evolved from the legal traditions of the Middle Ages in England. The Coif itself originated as a tight-fitting headpiece once used by both men and women. A version of this, in the form a close-fitting hood that covered all but the face, was adopted as a symbol for those barristers who had been recognized as serjeants-at-law and thus formed the narrow pool of legal practitioners who could be appointed judges of the Court of Common Pleas or, later, of the King's Bench. With this distinctive apparel, the serjeants-at-law became known as "serjeants of the coif" and their group within society as the original Order of the Coif; this predecessor inspired the name and markings of the American Order, although beyond inspiration, there is no legal connection between the two.

A new member receives a certificate of membership, a badge of membership for wear during academic ceremonies, a Coif key, and in some cases an actual coif or a representation of one. The society's gold key features a relief bust of a sergeant-at-law wearing a wig and coif and the name "Order of the Coif". Its colors are maroon and black.

== Membership ==
The induction process varies by law school, but students are generally notified of their membership after the final class ranks at their schools are announced. The basic requirement for membership is ranking in the top ten percent of a member school's graduating class. If a member law school graduates fewer than thirty students, it may induct its top three students. A school can decide not to allow an otherwise eligible student to receive the honor and may impose additional requirements for membership beyond the organization's national requirement of being in the top ten percent of the class.

Each member school may also induct a faculty member and one honorary member each year. The national organization's executive committee may also elect a limited number of honorary members. Those chosen for honorary membership are usually U.S. Supreme Court justices and other preeminent members of the legal profession.

== Chapters ==
As of 2022, 87 of 203 United States law schools accredited by the American Bar Association to award the Juris Doctor (J.D.) degree had Order of the Coif chapters.

== See also ==
- Professional fraternities and sororities
