= Tuck (sewing) =

Fold or pleat in fabric

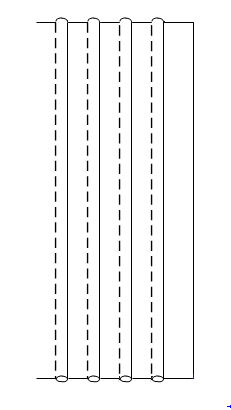
Drawing of pintucks

In sewing, a tuck is a fold or pleat in fabric that is sewn or fastened in place.

Small tucks, especially multiple parallel tucks, may be used to decorate clothing or household linens. When the tucks are very narrow, they are called pintucks or Pin-tucking.

Tucks are also used to shorten a finished garment, especially a child's garment, so that it may be lengthened ("let down") as the child grows by removing the stitching holding the tuck in place.

In Louisa May Alcott's Little Women, Amy says:

"My only comfort," she said to Meg, with tears in her eyes, "is that Mother doesn't take tucks in my dresses whenever I'm naughty, as Maria Parks's mother does. My dear, it's really dreadful, for sometimes she is so bad her frock is up to her knees, and she can't come to school.

— Chapter 4: Burdens

Tucks, made easy with the invention of the sewing machine, were very popular as ornamentation in the latter half of the 19th century, especially in fine linen or cotton fabric for chemisettes, engageantes, blouses, lingerie, summer dresses, and children's garments. Tucks were also used to decorate heavier fabrics: a travelling suit of "rough cheviot" (sturdy wool) is described as having its skirt "tucked, each tuck two inches wide and two inches apart, eight tucks in all, box-pleating at the bottom".

== Gallery ==
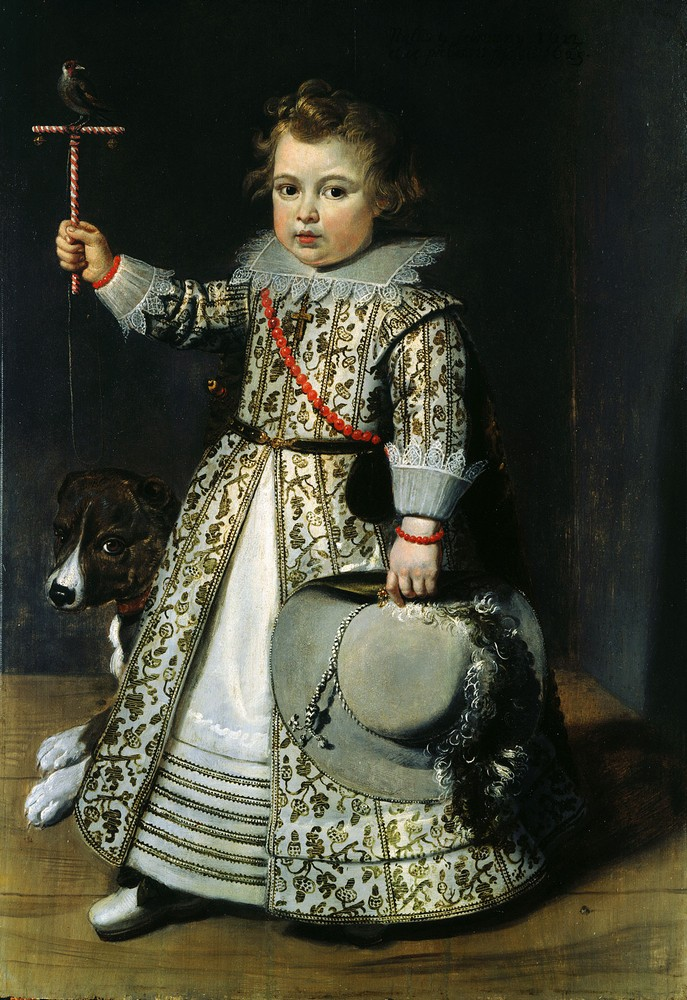
Young Boy of 1625 wearing a gown and kirtle shortened by deep tucks near the hem.

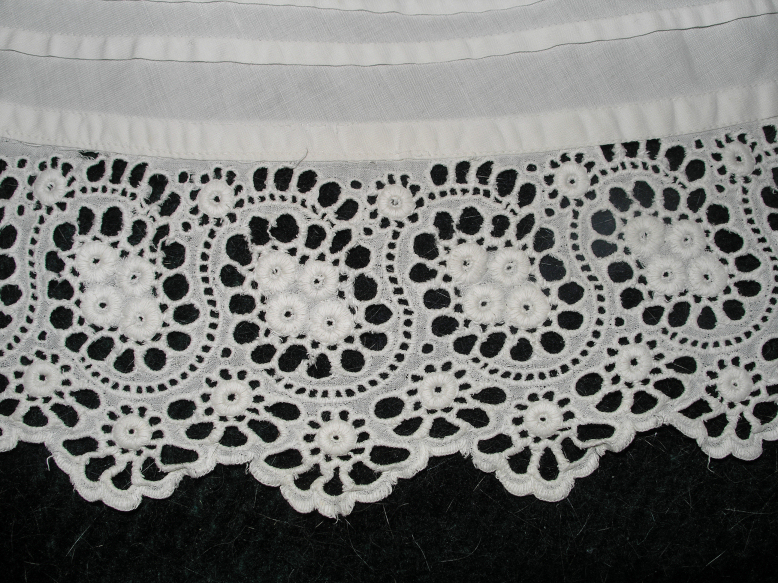
Petticoat with tucks above the cutwork border.

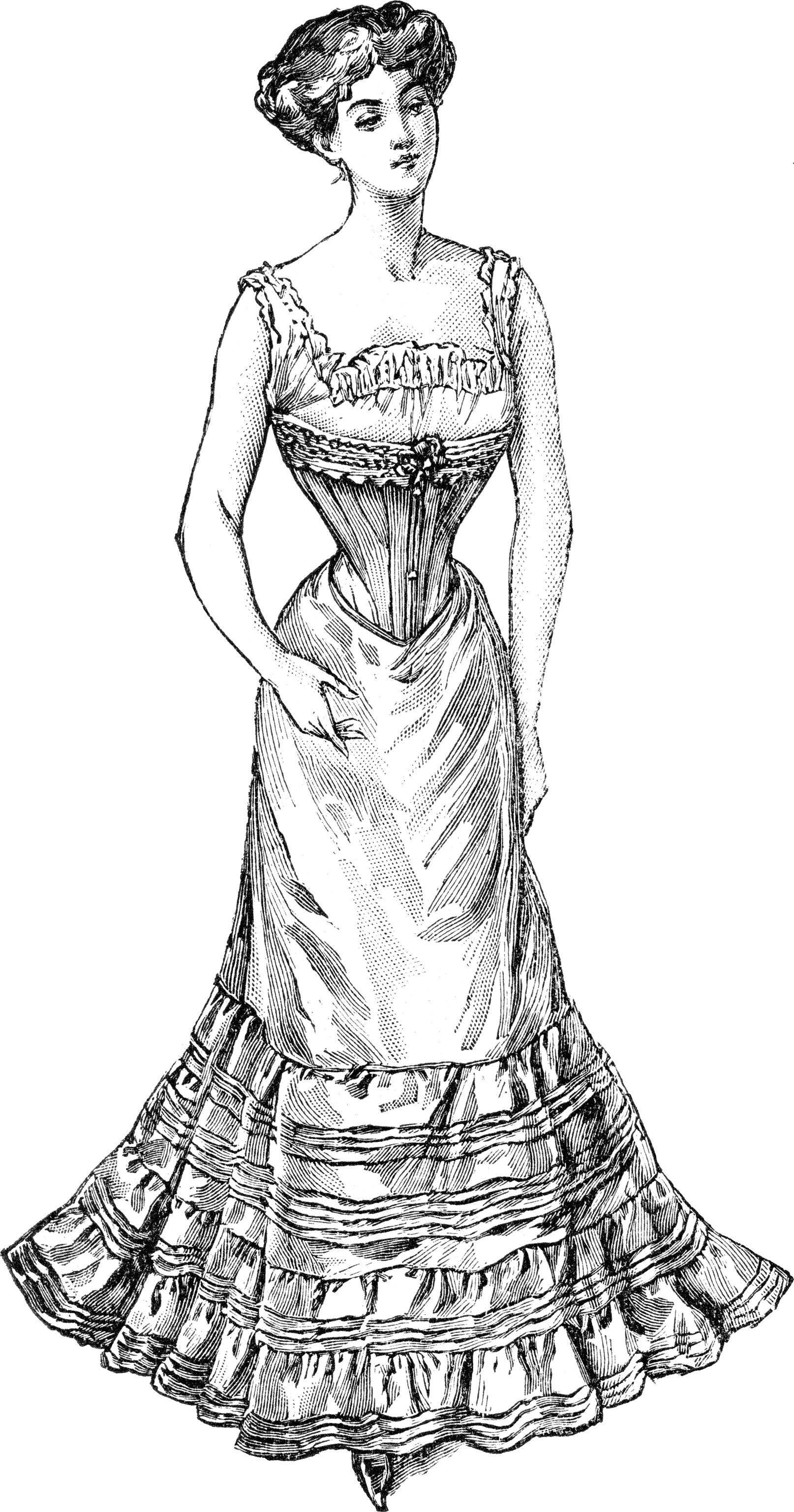
Petticoat trimmed with tucks, c. 1903-04

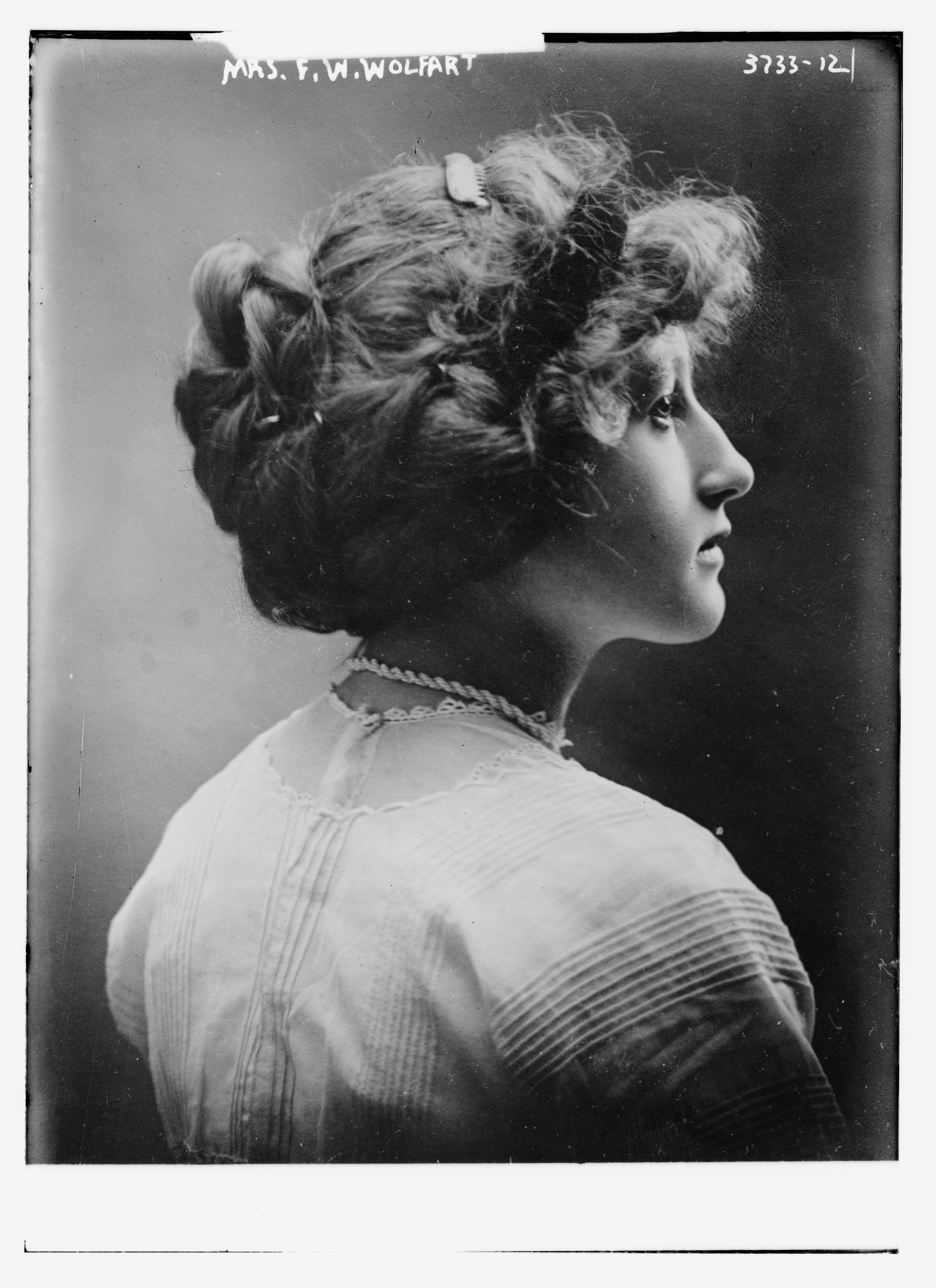
Blouse with pintucks, c. 1915
