= Wertman =

Wertman is a surname. It is a combination of the words "worth" and "man". Notable people with the surname include:

- Adlai Wertman (born 1959), American academic
- Moshe Wertman (1924–2011), Israeli politician
- Sarah Killgore Wertman (1843–1935), American lawyer
