= Partlet =

16th-century fashion accessory

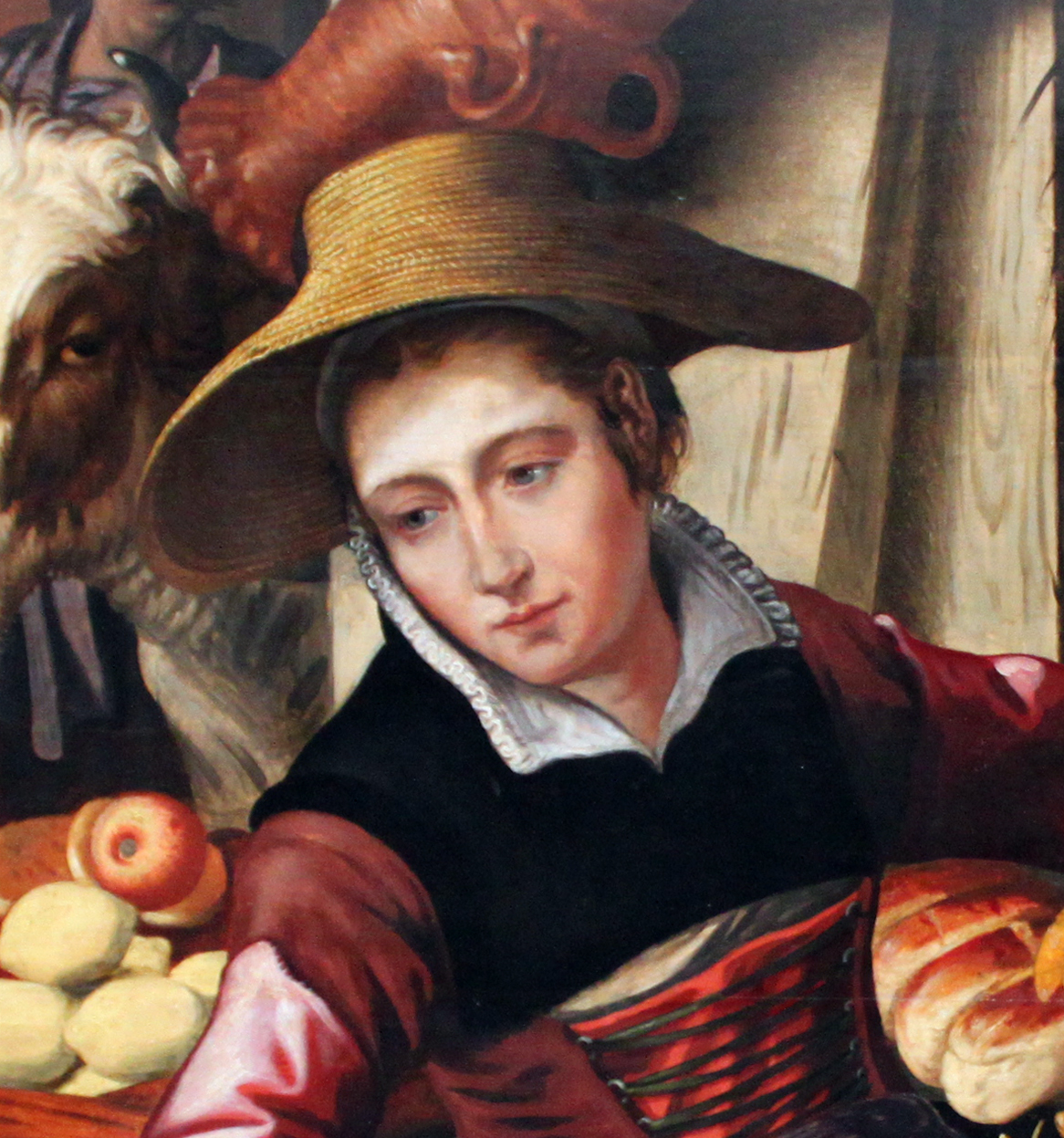
Market woman wearing a black partlet with a white lining over a reddish kirtle, Netherlandish, 1567.

A partlet (or partlett) was a 16th-century fashion accessory. The partlet was a sleeveless garment worn over the neck and shoulders, either worn over a dress or worn to fill in a low neckline.

The earliest partlets appeared in European fashion late in the 15th century. Comments on a miniature dated to c. 1485 note a Flemish style of partlet in that period. The English word "partlet" dates from at least 1515.

Partlet makers emerged, putting out a product often made of silk or linen, and worn to fill in the low necklines of both men's and women's Burgundian dress. Men continued to wear partlets, usually of rich materials, with the low-cut doublets of the early 16th century.

Early in the 16th century, partlets worn by women were made using a variety of fabrics and colors, although black was most popular. Black partlets worn over the gown, usually of velvet or satin for the upper classes, are an earlier style. A wardrobe warrant of June 1538 ordered black velvet for a "French partlet" for Princess Mary. Depictions which have been made by painters of such black partlets may be seen in a number of portraits of Tudor court ladies which were made by Hans Holbein the Younger (in England between 1526 and c. 1540), as well as in the works showing market women which were produced by Dutch painters throughout the 16th century.

Fine partlets made of linen lawn, with small standing collars and ruffles, could be worn directly over a low-necked smock, or over the kirtle. The "Pelican Portrait" of Elizabeth I shows the Elizabethan fashion for matching partlet and sleeves worked with blackwork embroidery. Such sets of partlet and sleeves were common New Year's gifts to the queen. In 1562, Lady Cobham gifted the queen "a partelett and a peire of sleeves of sypers wrought with silver and black silke".

Elaborate lattice-work partlets such as that worn by Eleanor of Toledo (1522-1562) in one of her portraits by Bronzino could be decorated by goldsmiths with gold, jewels and pearls. This was called "Caulle fashion" in England. In 1563 Elizabeth's silkwoman Alice Montague employed a woman "altering and translating" the queen's partlets. 1568 Elizabeth I set her "Mistress Launder" to work to "translate" her partlets with 520 pearls costing a penny each.

The origin of the term 'partlet' (attested from 1515) is uncertain, but it may derive from 'Dame Partlet', a traditional name for a hen, perhaps in reference to the ruffle of feathers on some hens' necks.

== Gallery ==
Partlets

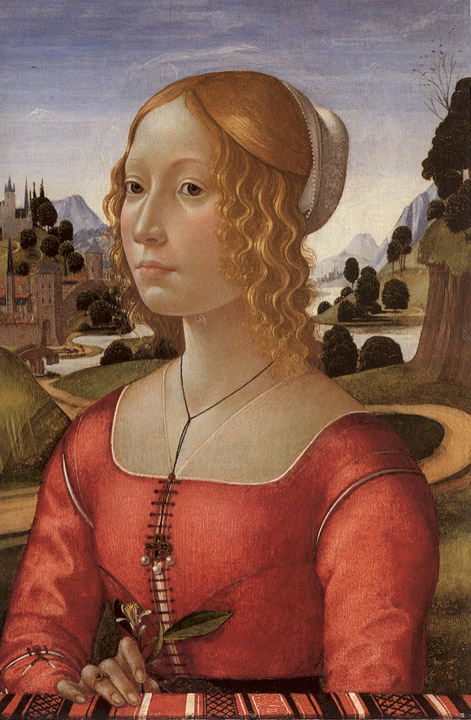
Italian partlet, c. 1490

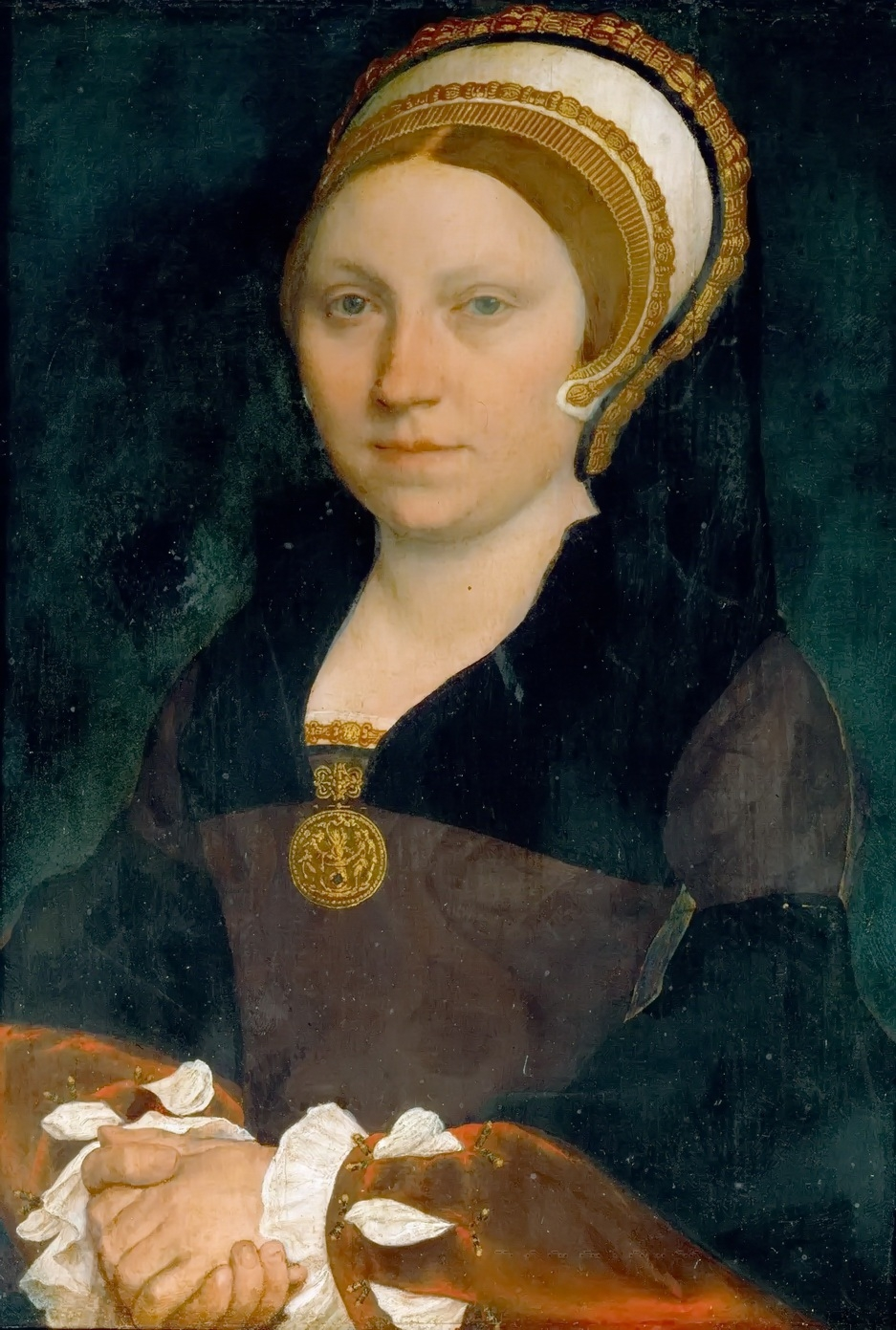
Tudor partlet, c. 1540–43

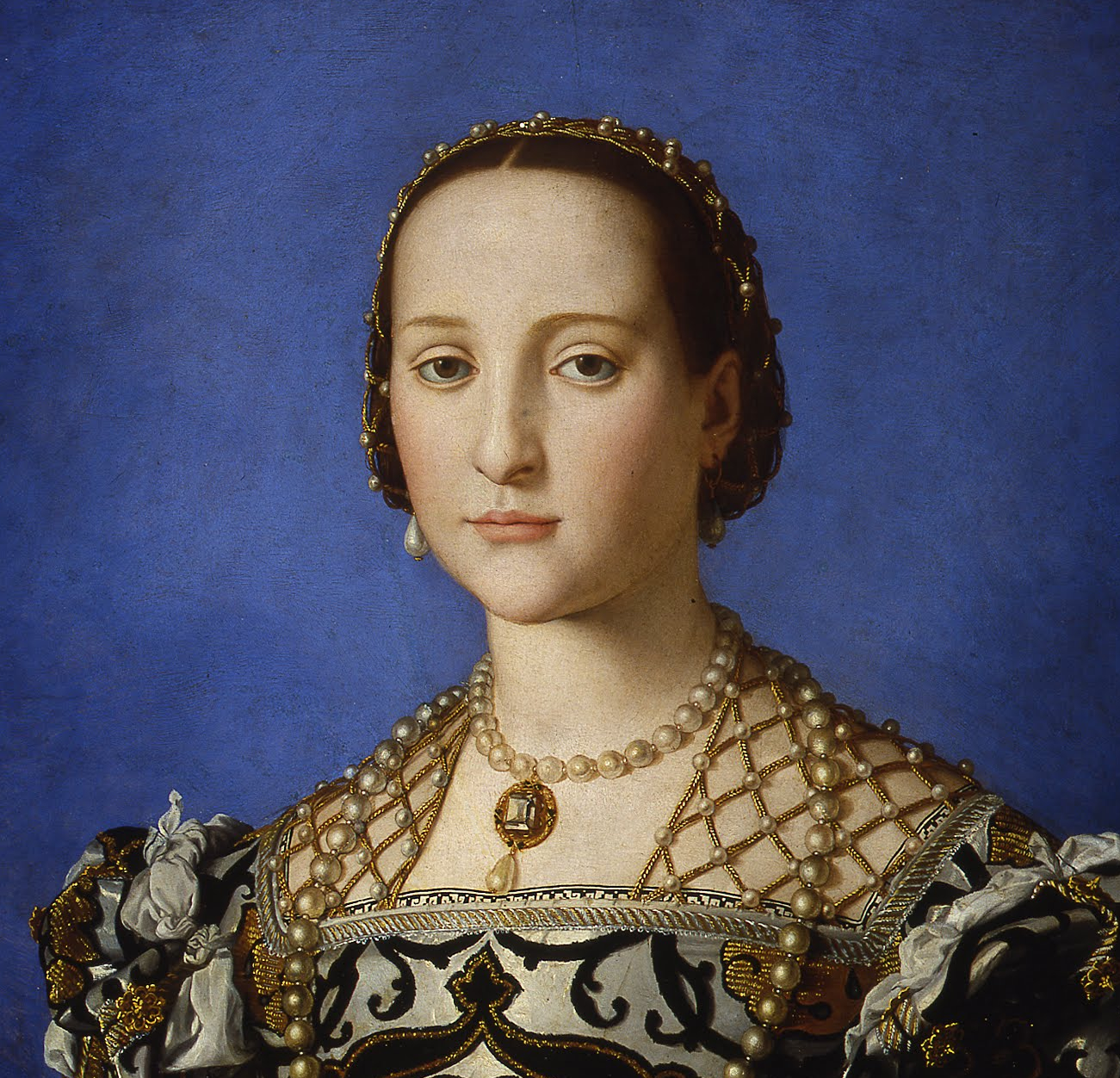
Lattice-work partlet worn by Eleanor of Toledo

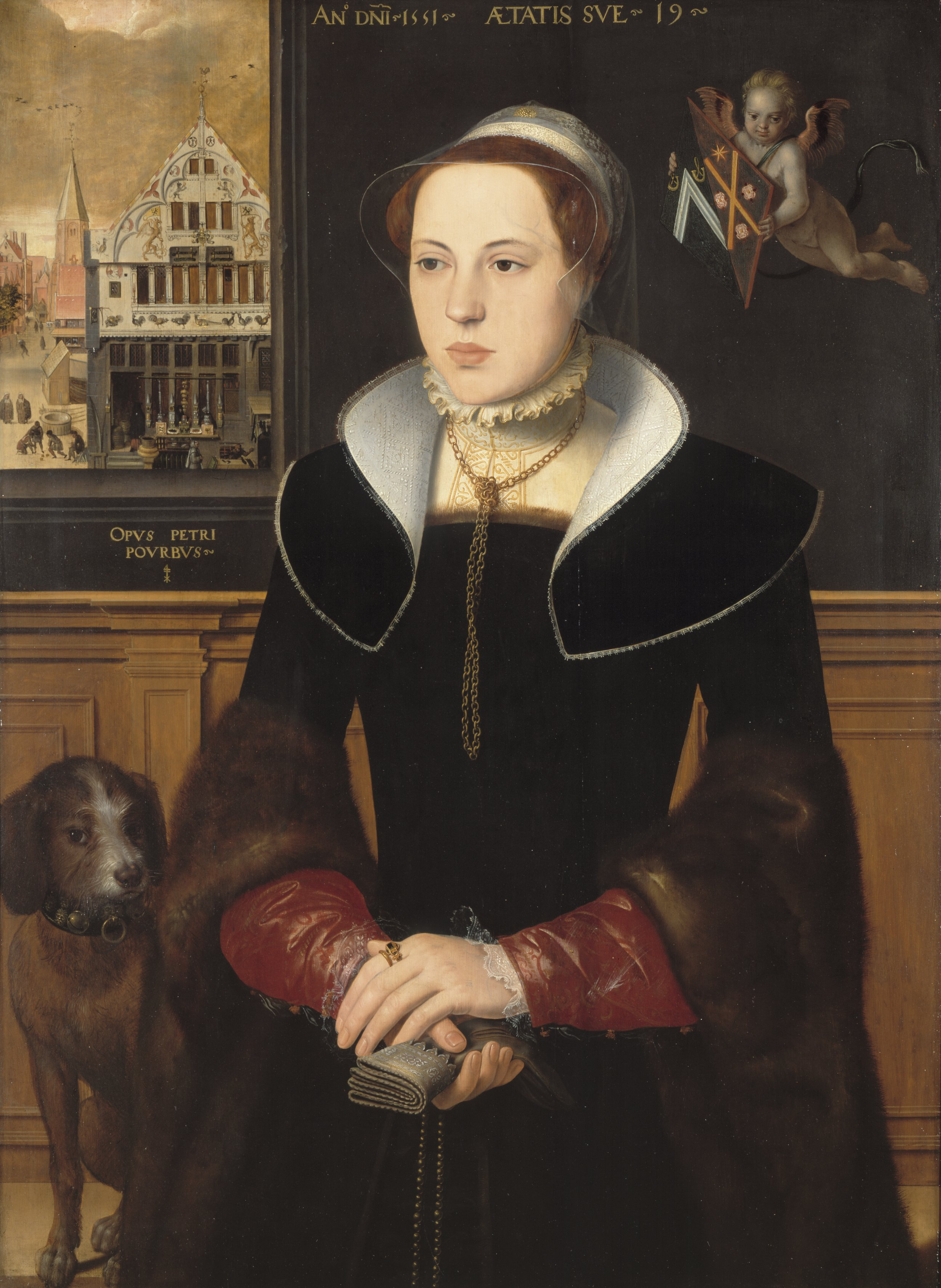
Netherlandish partlet

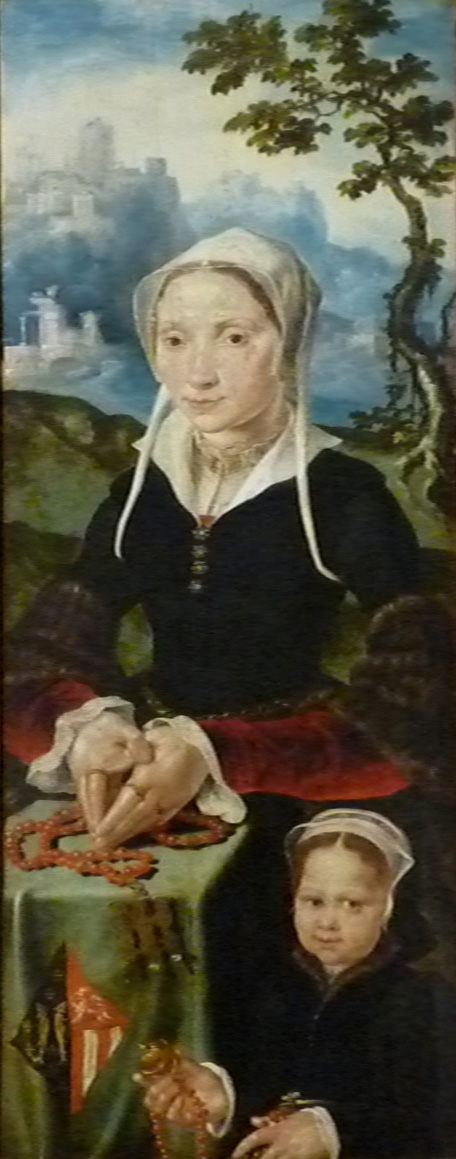
Netherlandish partlet, c. 1560

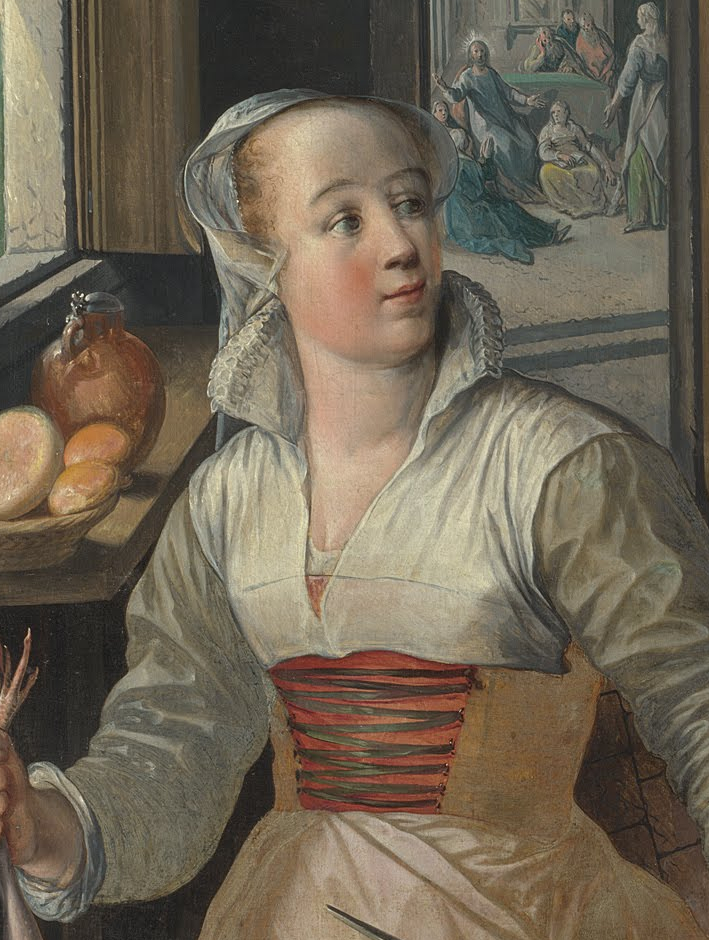
Linen partlet with ties

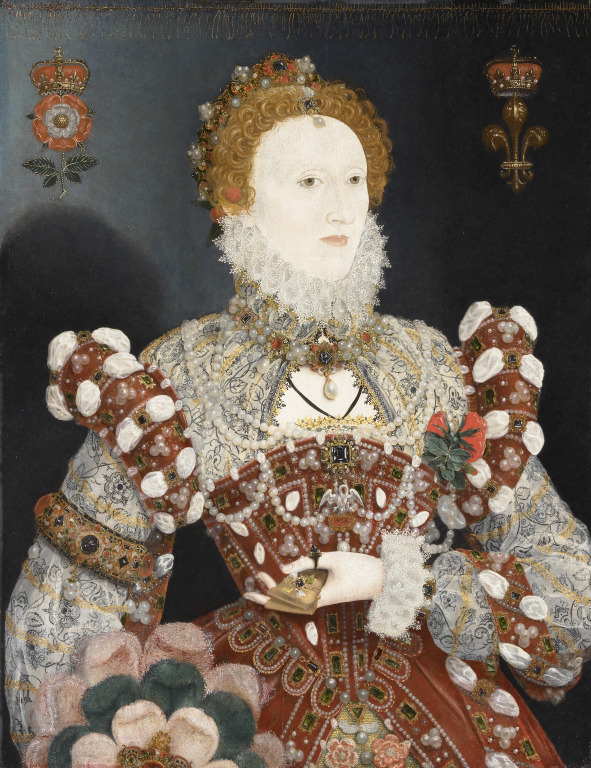
The "Pelican Portrait", c. 1573–75

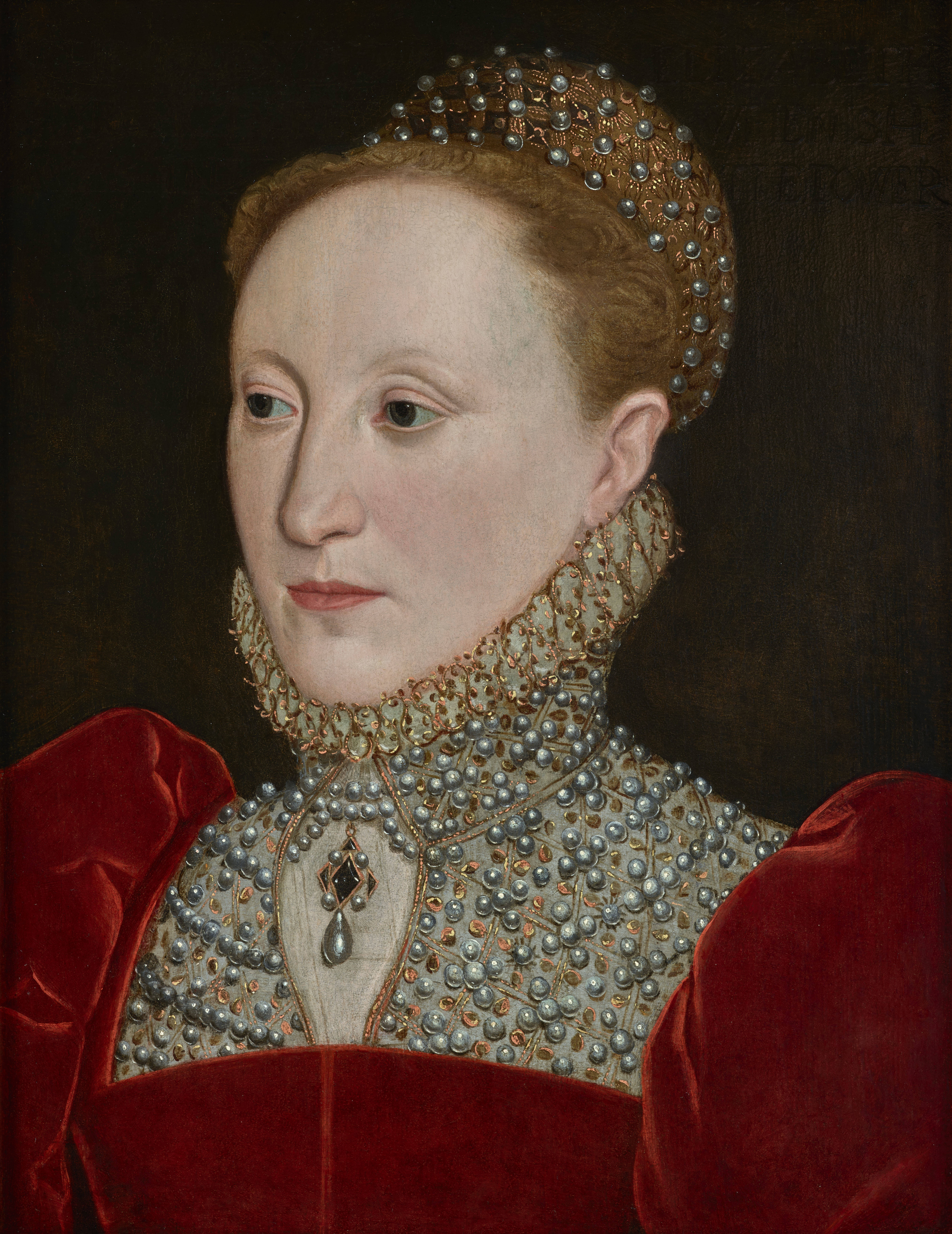
Elizabeth I with a partlet embroidered with pearls

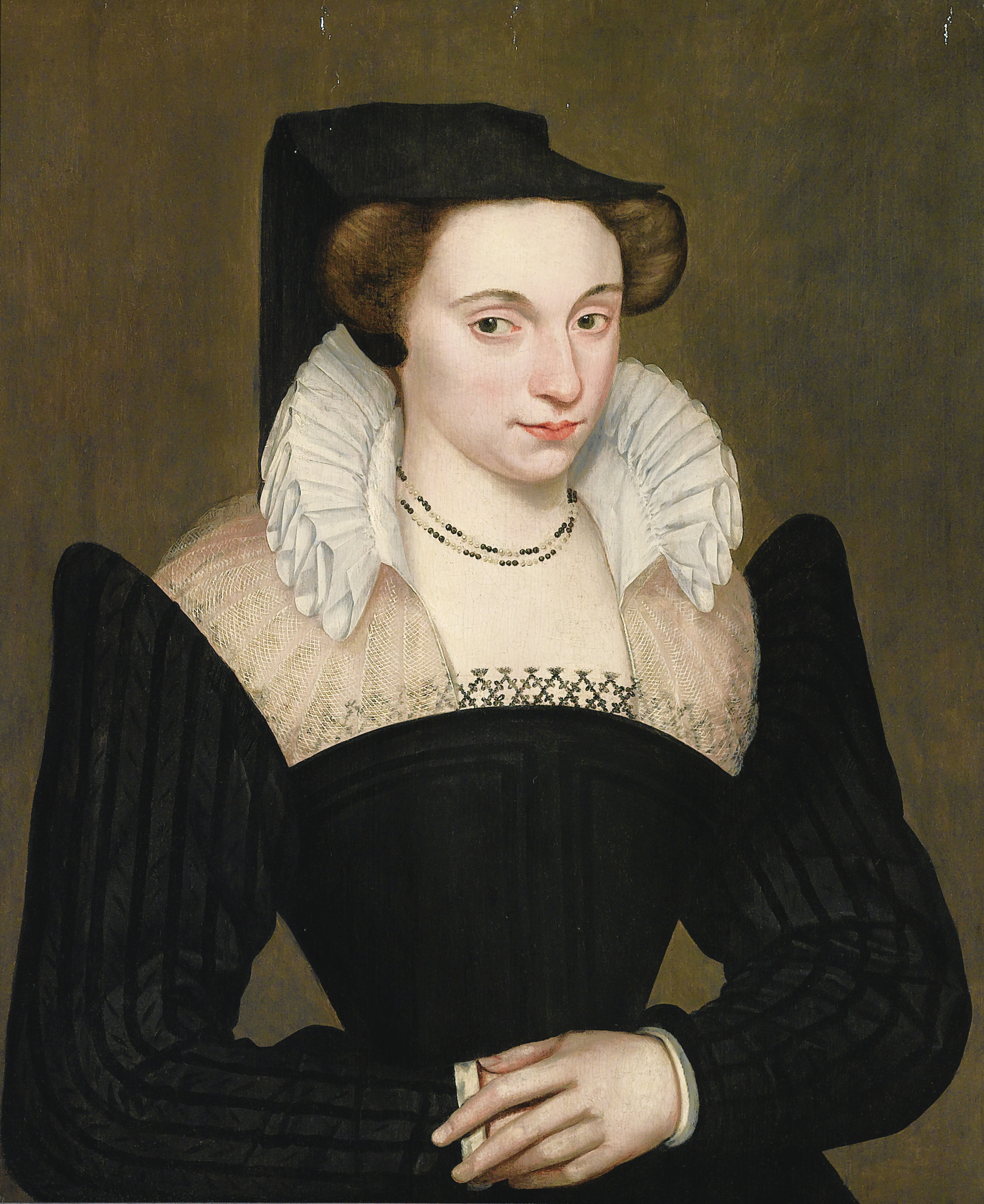
French open partlet with attached collar and ruffle

== See also ==
- Guimpe
- Chemisette
