= Guimpe =

Medieval West European garment

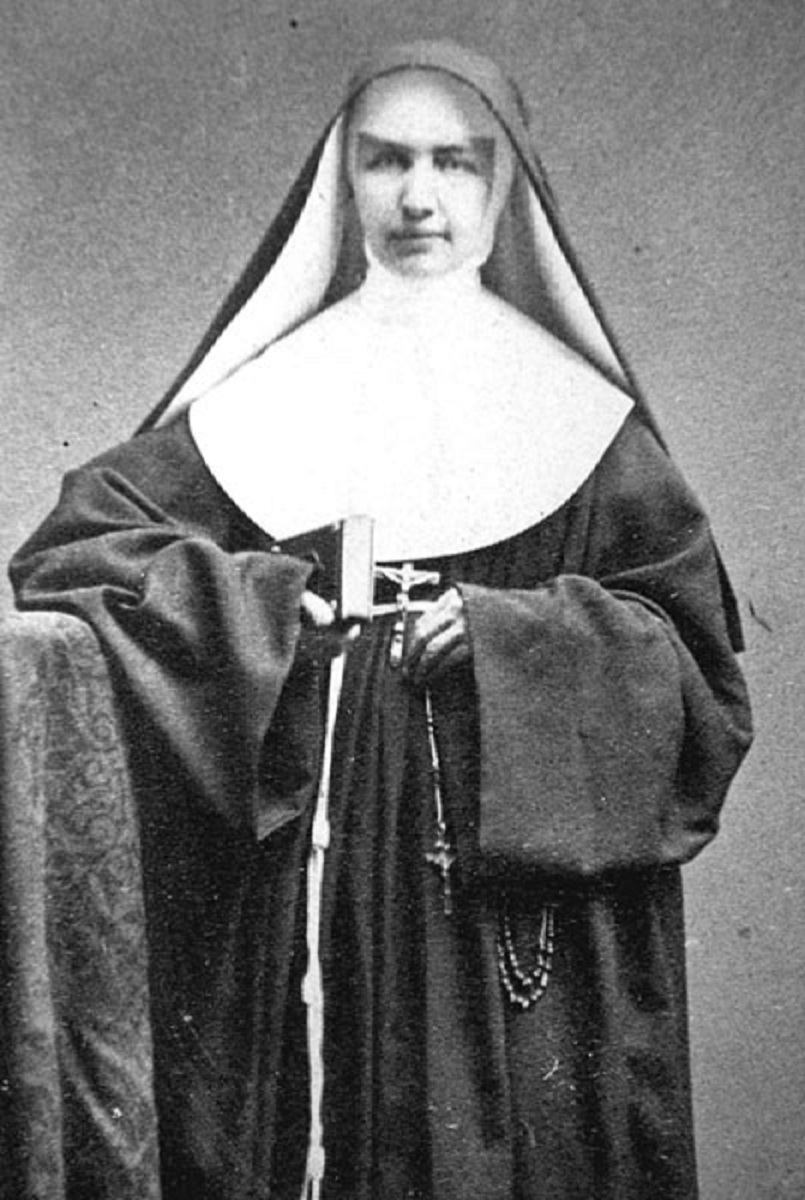
St. Marianne Cope, wearing a religious habit including a large guimpe

The guimpe (from the French guimpe) was a garment which developed in medieval Western Europe. It was a silk or linen kerchief, sometimes sheer, sometimes starched, which covered the neck and shoulders of the wearer, sometimes the entire chest as well. It was worn as part of the apparel of a woman of means, both to show social standing – due to the added upkeep it required – and to demonstrate the woman's sense of modesty. Among nuns it was worn in combination with a coif and wimple.

As women in Renaissance Italy began to leave their heads uncovered, and to expose their shoulders, the guimpe slowly fell into disuse. Its use continued solely in monasteries, as part of a nun's religious habit. As women's religious orders began to adopt contemporary attire, it has largely disappeared from these circles as well.

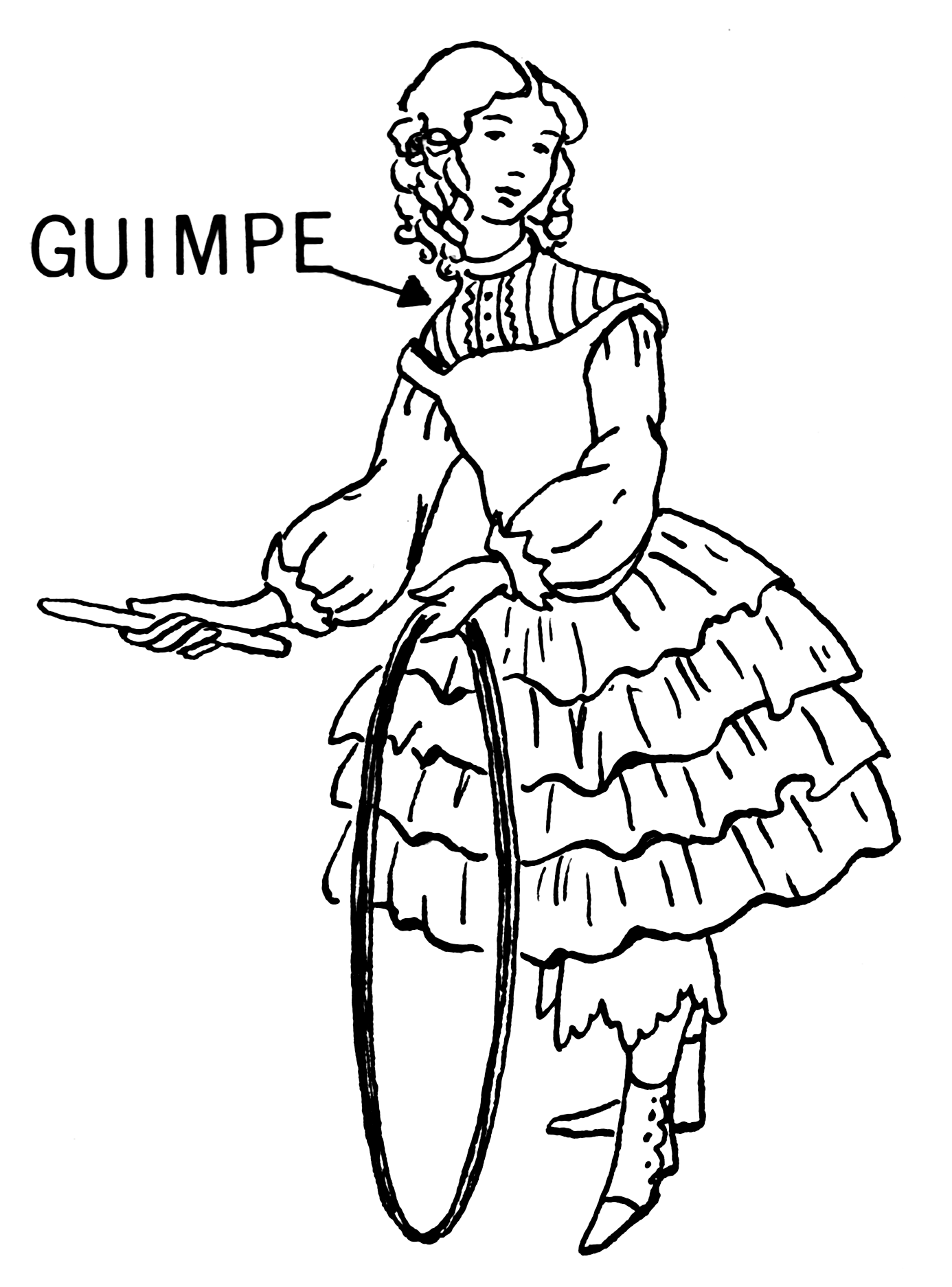

From the early nineteenth century onwards, the term guimpe also described a form of short under-blouse or chemisette which was worn under a pinafore or low cut dress to fill in the neckline and, if sleeved, cover the arms.

For a similar garment of the sixteenth century, see partlet.
