= Chemisette =

19th-century women's fashion accessory

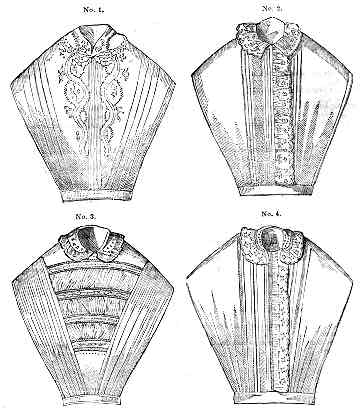
Chemisettes from Godey's Lady's Book 1850

A chemisette (from French, "little chemise") is an article of women's clothing worn to fill in the front and neckline of any garment. Chemisettes give the appearance of a blouse or shirt worn under the outer garment without adding bulk at the waist or upper arm.

Chemisettes of linen or cotton were often worn with day dresses in the mid-19th century, and could be decorated with tucks, embroidery (especially whitework), or lace.

When wide pagoda sleeves were fashionable (1850s), chemisettes might have matching engageantes (false undersleeves).

== See also ==
- Guimpe
- Godey's Lady's Book (links to online editions)
- 1850s in fashion
- 1860s in fashion
- Dickey (garment), a similar false-front mostly for men's shirts in the early 20th century
- Trim (sewing)
- Victorian fashion
