= The Life of Jane Dormer, Duchess of Feria =

English chronicle

The Life of Jane Dormer, Duchess of Feria was a chronicle written by Jane Dormer, lady-in-waiting to Mary I of England.
