= The Social History of Lighting =

1958 book by William T. O'Dea

The Social History of Lighting, by William T. O'Dea, is a nonfiction book about the history of artificial lighting from prehistory through the present. It was first published by Macmillan Inc., in 1958. O'Dea had previously been the keeper of the Science Museum, London.

It received a generally positive review from E.S. Turner in The Daily Telegraph.
