= Adlai, West Virginia =

Unincorporated community in West Virginia, United States

Adlai
- Unincorporated community
- Location within the state of West Virginia Adlai (the United States)
- Coordinates: 39°20′16″N 81°03′47″W
- Country: United States
- State: West Virginia
- County: Pleasants
- Elevation: 801 ft (244 m)
- Time zone: UTC-5 (Eastern (EST))
  - Summer (DST): UTC-4 (EDT)
- GNIS ID: 1553696

Adlai is an unincorporated community in Pleasants County, West Virginia, United States. Adlai is located along South Fork Rock Run.
