= Wimple =

Medieval form of female headdress

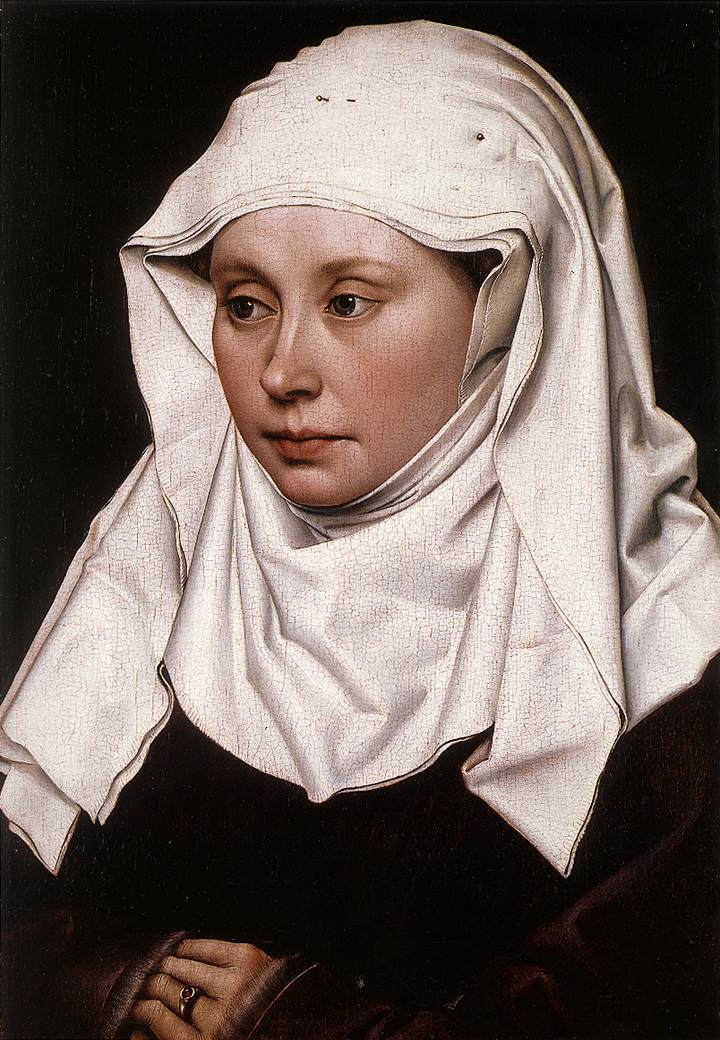
A wimple as shown in Portrait of a Woman, 1430–1435, by Robert Campin (1375/1379–1444), National Gallery, London. The wimple is constructed of four layers of cloth and the pins holding it in place are visible at the top of the head.

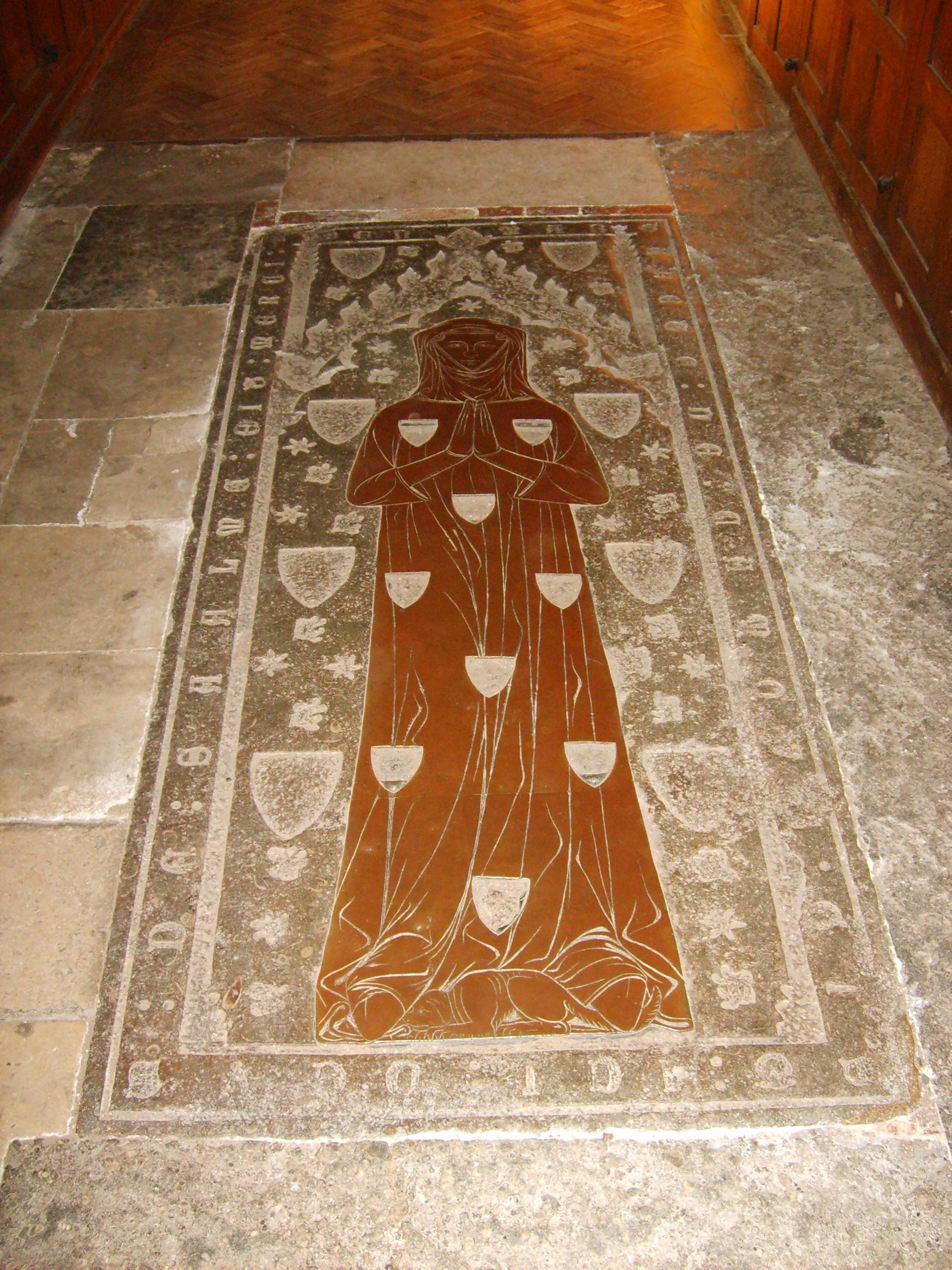
Monumental brass of Margaret, Lady Camoys (d.1310), St George's Church, Trotton, West Sussex. This is the earliest surviving brass of a female figure in England. She wears around her neck a wimple (or gorget) which hides the chin and sides of the face. This style of dress continued in fashion until the end of the reign of King Edward III (1327–1377).

A wimple (or gorget) is a medieval form of female headcovering, formed of a large piece of cloth worn draped around the neck and chin, covering the top of the head; it was usually made from white linen or silk. Its use developed in early medieval Europe; in medieval Christianity, a married woman showing her hair was considered unseemly. A wimple might be elaborately starched, creased and folded in prescribed ways. Later elaborate versions were supported on wire or wicker framing, such as the escoffion or the cornette.

Italian women abandoned their head coverings in the 15th century or replaced them with transparent gauze, showing their braids. Elaborate braiding and elaborately laundered clothes demonstrated status, because such grooming was performed by others. Today a plain wimple is worn by the nuns of certain orders who retain a traditional habit.

== In literature ==
In Meidan Maregrete, St Margaret of Antioch binds up a devil with her wempel ('wimple').

In Geoffrey Chaucer's The Canterbury Tales (c. 1387 – 1400), the Wife of Bath and the Prioress are depicted wearing wimples.

The King James Version of the Bible reads "wimples" in Isaiah 3:22 in a list of women's fine clothes, although the precise meaning of the underlying Hebrew word miṭpaḥat (מִטְפַּחַת, 'cloak') remains uncertain (compare "vail" [veil] in Ruth 3:15, the only other occurrence in the Hebrew Bible).

== See also ==
- Guimpe
- Headpiece
- Headscarf
- Hijab
- Veil
