= Adlai Wertman =

American business professor and banker

- Born: August 22, 1959 (age 66); Queens, New York, United States
- Education: Stony Brook University; University of Pennsylvania
- Employer: USC Marshall School of Business
- Title: Professor of clinical entrepreurship
- Website: marshall.usc.edu/faculty/directory/awertman

Adlai Wertman (born August 22, 1959, in Queens, New York) was the David C. Bohnett Professor of Social Entrepreneurship at the Marshall School of Business at the University of Southern California, retiring in 2024. He was also the founding director of the Brittingham Social Enterprise Lab at Marshall, a center focused on using business education and resources to address global social, environmental and health challenges.

From 2001 to 2007, Wertman was president and CEO of Chrysalis, a non-profit, privately funded organization in Los Angeles, California, that helps homeless individuals secure employment through training and job placement. In 2005, Chrysalis helped 2,500 homeless people in Los Angeles find jobs.

In 2000, after 18 years as a Wall Street investment banker, Wertman left his job to run Chrysalis. His career switch, from investment banker managing director to homeless service provider, was profiled in the Los Angeles Times, The Jerusalem Post, Los Angeles Business Journal, and other publications.

In 2009, Los Angeles Mayor Antonio Villaraigosa appointed Wertman Commissioner of the Los Angeles Fire and Police Pension Fund, which oversees the city's $14 billion uniformed employee pension portfolio. His term expired in 2011.

Wertman is an advisory board member of the Roberts Enterprise Development Fund (REDF) and the Global Health Institute at the Keck School of Medicine of USC and a trustee of the Jewish Community Foundation Los Angeles.

He is a senior fellow at the USC Center for Religion and Civic Culture and the UCLA School of Public Affairs. He is also a Wexner Heritage Fellow.

Wertman consults with numerous non-profits and government groups and is a frequent speaker on the issues of social entrepreneurship, social enterprise, fundraising and non-profit management.

Wertman earned his BA in econometrics from the State University of New York at Stony Brook and his MBA in finance, public policy management and strategic planning from The Wharton School at the University of Pennsylvania. He lives in Los Angeles with his wife, Janet, and their three children.
