= Open Letters Monthly =

Online arts and culture magazine

Open Letters Monthly or Open Letters Monthly: an Arts and Literature Review, was an online arts and culture magazine. It was founded in 2007 by Sam Sacks, John Cotter, and Steve Donoghue, and published its last issue in 2017. It features long-form criticism of books, films, and art exhibits as well as original artwork and poetry.

== Critical reception ==
In 2007, M. A. Orthofer of the complete review called Open Letters Monthly "the best new on-line literary periodical out there." In 2010, blogger, author, and critic Maud Newton noted that "Open Letters has been doing really great stuff for a long time." Daniel E. Pritchard of The Critical Flame wrote that the Open Letters Monthly "presents a primer on some of the best internet reviews and criticism available."
