= Wedding canopy =

Wedding canopy may refer to:

- Chuppah, the wedding canopy used in Jewish weddings
- Mandap, the wedding canopy used in Hindu, Sikh and Jain weddings
- Nuptial veil, the wedding canopy used in Christian weddings
