= Care cloth =

Cloth used in ancient wedding tradition

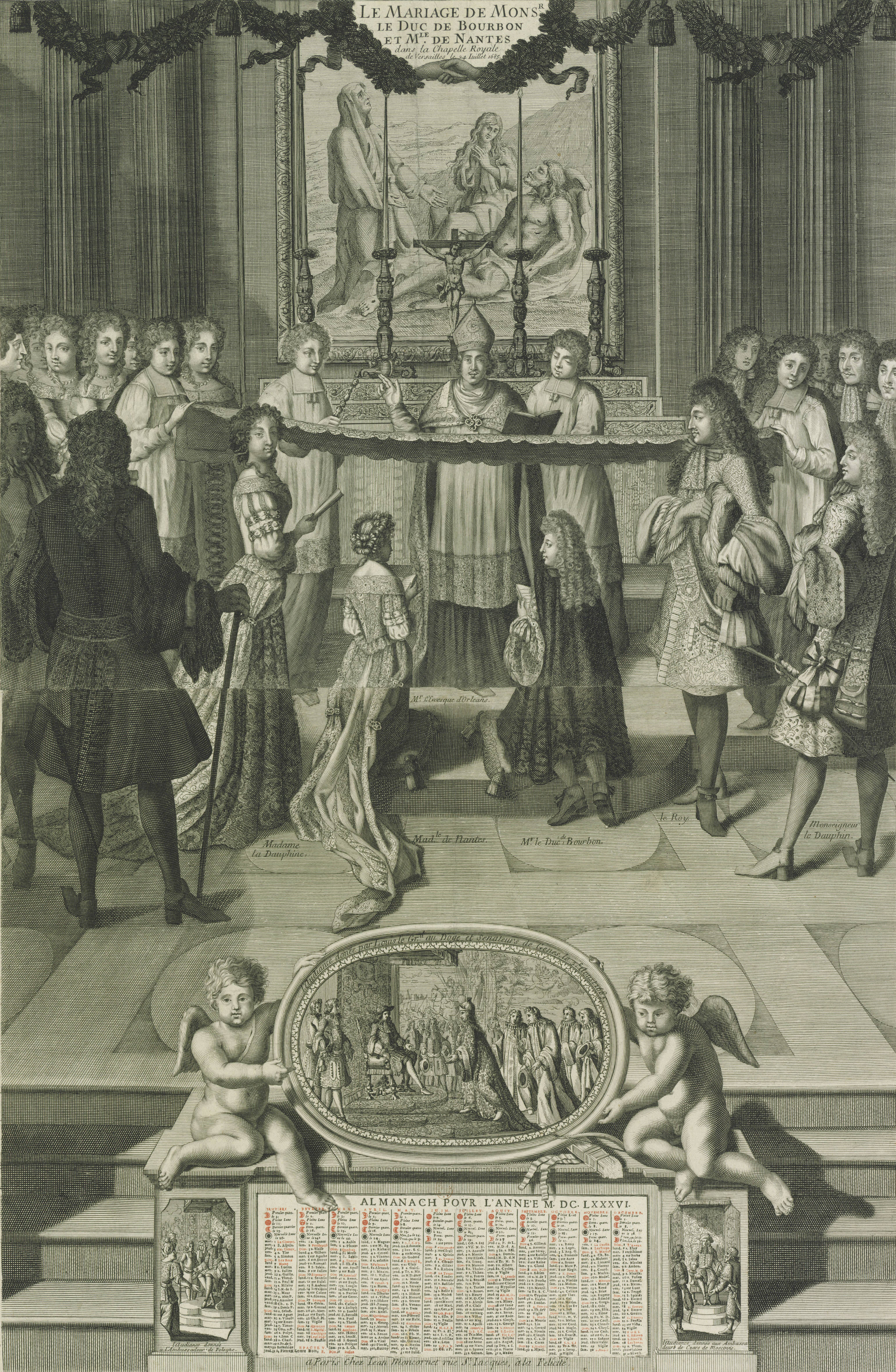
Engraving depicting the marriage of the Duke of Bourbon and Mademoiselle de Nantes at Versailles in 1685, with a nuptial veil held over the couple

The nuptial veil, which is also referred to as the care cloth, carde clothe or wedding canopy, is an ancient Christian wedding tradition where a cloth is held over the heads of the bride and groom during the Nuptial Blessing. Symbolizing the "marriage yoke joining the bride and groom together", it is a rectangular linen or silk sheet smaller than the analogous Chuppah of Judaism, typically featuring a red pattern or a red cord, and is white in color. St. Isidore of Seville explained that the white represents the purity of Christian and marital love, while the red signifies the continuation of the family bloodline.

== Use ==
Traditionally, the Care cloth had two distinct uses during the solemn nuptial blessing of the Mass. Firstly, it would be draped over the shoulders of the groom and over the head and shoulders of the bride as they knelt for blessing. This use symbolized the yoke of marriage, which binds the couple together.

Alternatively, the Care cloth may be suspended over the kneeling couple by the best man and maid of honor, or by two designated sponsors each holding a side. This use serves as a reminder to the couple to maintain decorum and privacy, as it partially conceals them from view.

During formal periods, this practice had an additional function. If a couple had a child born out of wedlock, placing the child under the care cloth with the parents would confer legitimacy upon the child.

== History ==
Reference to the wedding canopy is found in the Bible, in Psalm 19:5.

The mention of Care cloth can be found in John Brand's work Observations on the Popular Antiquities of Great Britain, which chiefly illustrates the origin of vulgar and provincial customs, ceremonies, and superstitions. Thomas Blount, in his Glossographia (1681), says that in the Sarum Rite, when there was a marriage before Mass, the couple would kneel together with a fine linen cloth laid over their heads during the Mass. They would remain under the cloth until they received the benediction, and then they would be dismissed, as John wrote.

=== Velatio nuptialis ===
In the era of the Church Fathers, the velatio nuptialis served as a validation of the Sacrament of Marriage by the Church, further confirming its significance.

Pope Siricius, during the latter part of the fourth century, drew attention to the significance of the velatio, also known as the canopy veil or huppa. This concept was later referenced in the Veronense Sacramentary, which was compiled between the fifth and seventh centuries, and was specifically identified as the Velatio nuptialis, referring to the nuptial veiling. During the Anglo-Saxon period, the Nuptial Benediction was typically conducted with the use of a veil, which was a square piece of cloth held over the heads of the bride and groom.

The use of Care cloth as a canopy until the 14th century is well-documented. Evidence supporting this includes references to the acquisition of a section of "Lucca cloth" in the "wardrobe accounts" of Edward II, as well as its use during the nuptial mass of Richard and Isabella in 1321 as a veil to cover their heads.

By 1530, its usage had declined, though the care cloth continues to be used in certain traditional wedding liturgies of Western Christian denominations.

==== Origin ====
The origin of velatio nuptialis is uncertain, with some proposing a connection to Greek and Roman customs. However, the use of a red veil (flammeum) for brides in Roman marriages is sparsely documented in Church Fathers and not mentioned in ancient liturgy. Greco-Roman influence may have played a role, as the Latin and Greek terms for marriage - nubere, nuptiae connubium, and νυμφίος - all relate to the concept of a veil. Contemporary Jewish wedding ceremonies feature a ceremonial canopy known as a "huppah", which lacks strong biblical support and may have been influenced by Christian practices. The 12th-century Rabbi Isaac ben Abba Mari decidedly disapproved of the incorporation of the practice of draping a cloth over the couple during the marriage benediction.

=== Significance ===
The wedding veil or care cloth held great significance in Western culture, so much so that it was the inspiration behind the event's name. In ancient Rome, a woman would wear a red veil on her wedding day to symbolize her new responsibilities and status as a married woman.

The Latin term "nubere", meaning to cover the head, gave rise to the word "nuptial" in English. Veiling was adopted by Latin Christians as early as the 300s, and the veil was used to cover both the bride and groom's heads, emphasizing their shared marital responsibilities. This is why the veil came to be known as the "care cloth" in English, as the word "care" originally meant to bear a burden. In Europe, the bridal veil became more popular than the care cloth after the Renaissance.

In Anglo-Saxon culture, the "care cloth" or "nuptial veil" played a significant role in wedding ceremonies as it was believed to symbolize the purity and sanctity of the union between the bride and groom. The veil was a square piece of fabric held over the heads of both individuals, and it was also meant to conceal the bride's blushes.

== Analogous customs ==
The canopy in British wedding ceremonies was purportedly employed to conceal the bride's blushing, although historical accounts from Edward describe it as a veil. Nonetheless, it cannot be conclusively regarded as a precursor to the veil, given that British brides did not typically wear veils until the eighteenth and nineteenth centuries.

Similar types of bridal canopy ceremonies may be performed during weddings across different societies, and they may hold different significances. The Chuppah, a canopy used in Jewish weddings, is another example of a canopy custom.

In Sri Lanka, a decorated canopy known as a "poruwa" is utilized during the wedding ceremony, serving as a platform where the couple can either sit or stand.

In Egyptian weddings, the bride is escorted to the baths the night before the wedding under a silk canopy. On the day of the wedding, the bride walks under a silk canopy of bright colors such as pink, rose, or yellow, often striped with two colors, which is carried by four men using a pole at each corner.

A canopy was used by the Bedouin of Ethiopia to conceal the bride. As part of Chinese wedding customs, a sacred umbrella was used to shield the bride's head from malevolent forces and safeguard this delicate body part.

The wedding mandapa refers to a temporary pavilion constructed specifically for the purpose of conducting Hindu or Jain weddings. It serves as the primary location for conducting the main wedding rituals and ceremonies.

== See also ==
- Christian head covering
- Lucca cloth
