= Chuppah =

Canopy under which a Jewish couple stand during their wedding

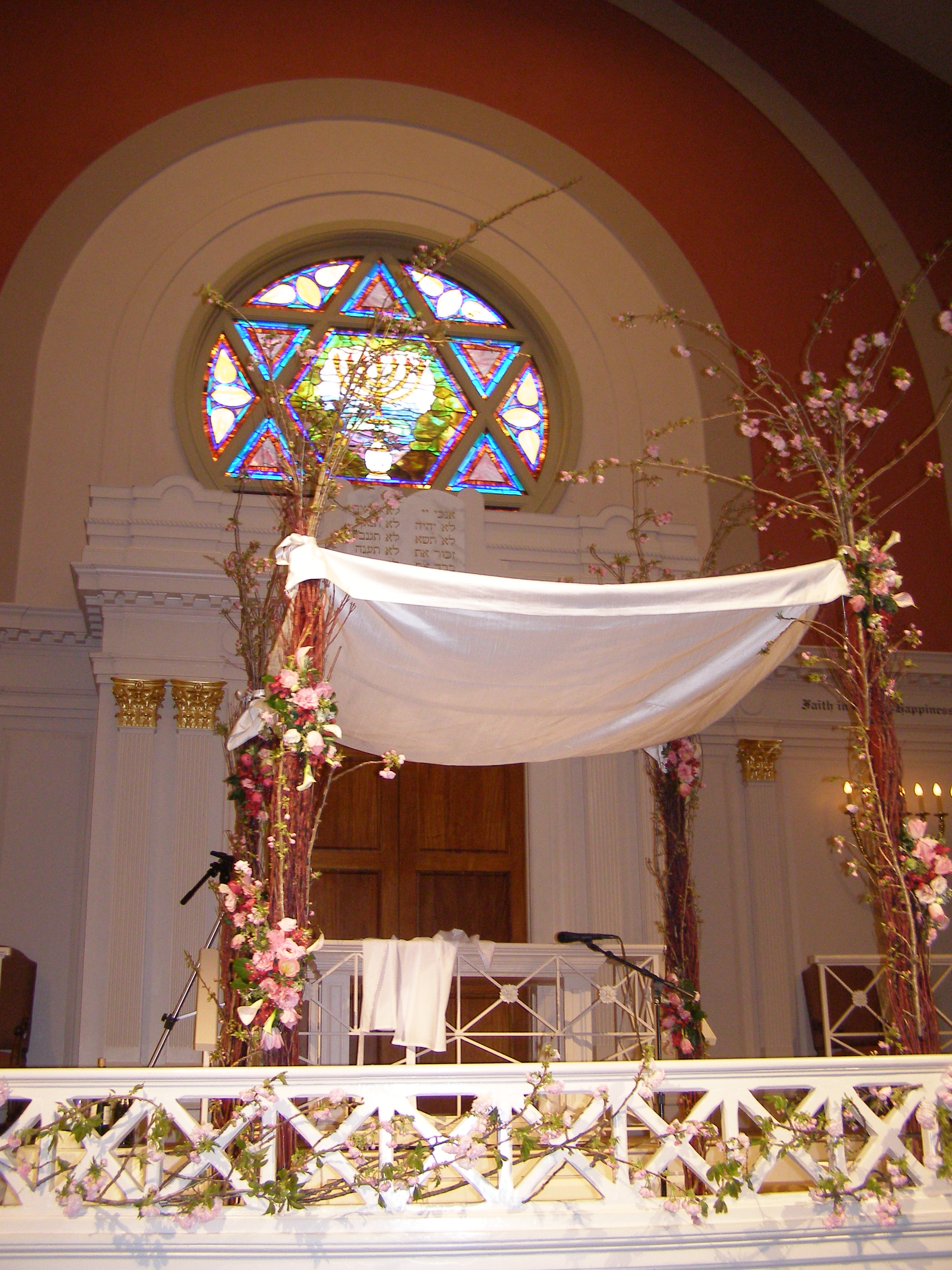
A chuppah at the Sixth & I Synagogue in Washington, D.C.

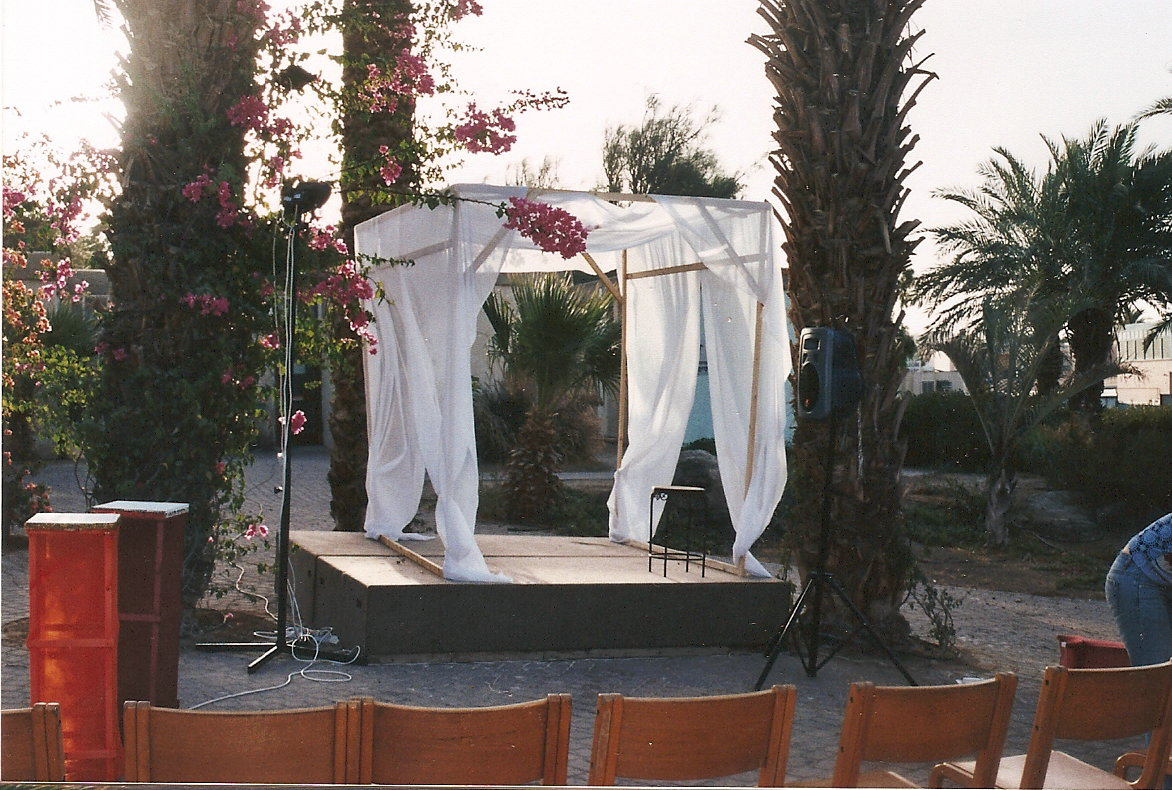
A chuppah wedding in kibbutz Eilot, Israel

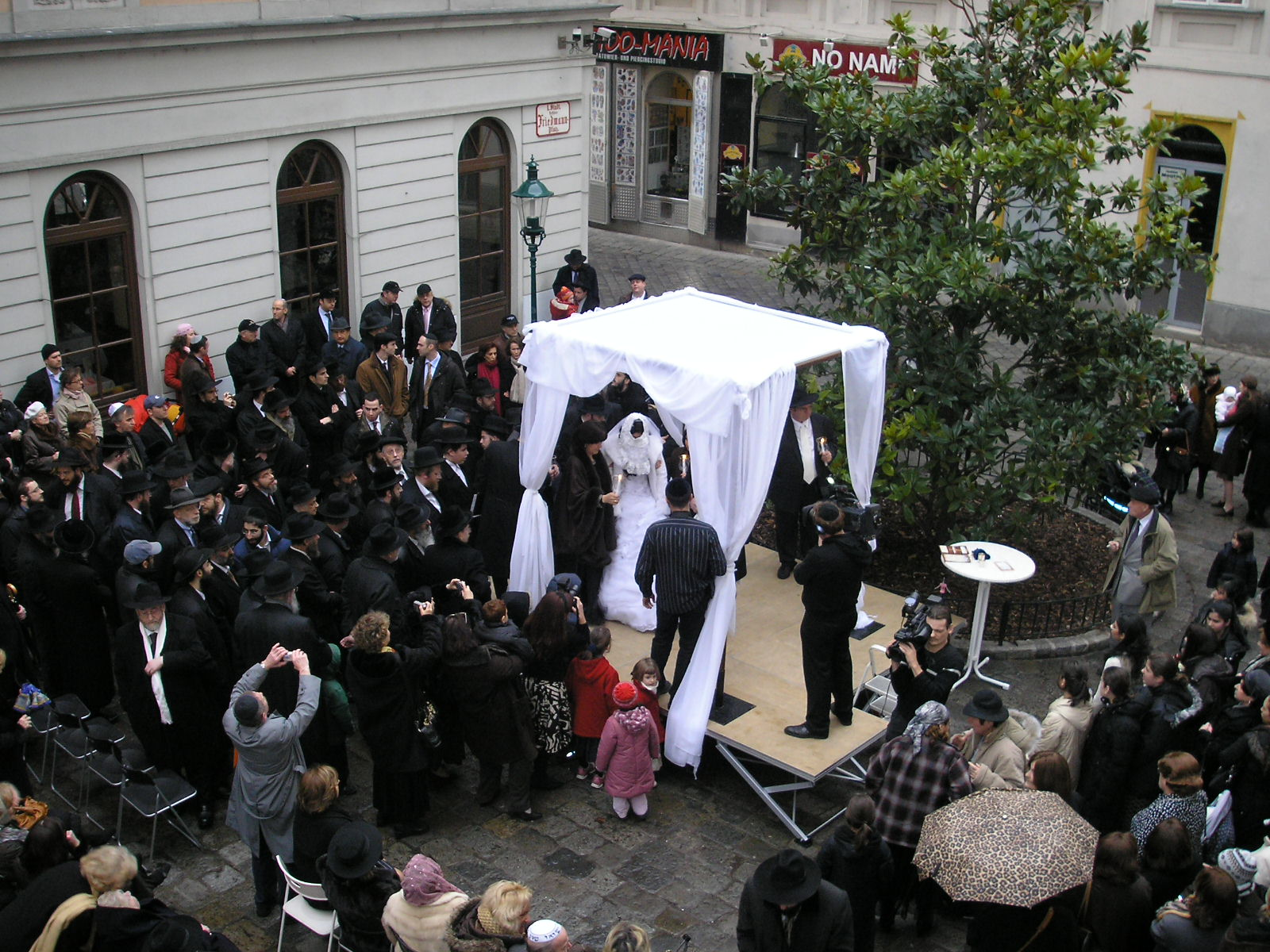
Orthodox Jewish wedding with chuppah in Vienna's first district, 2007

Chuppa at a synagogue in Toronto, Canada

A chuppah (Hebrew: חֻפָּה, romanized: ḥuppā, lit. 'canopy, covering', Yiddish: חֻפָּה, romanized: khupe~khipe) (Note: also huppah, chipe, chupah, or chuppa) is a canopy under which a Jewish couple stand during their wedding ceremony. It consists of a cloth or sheet, sometimes a tallit, stretched or supported over four poles, or sometimes manually held up by attendants to the ceremony. A chuppah symbolizes the home that the couple will build together.

In a more general sense, chuppah refers to the method by which nessuin, the second stage of a Jewish wedding, is accomplished. According to some opinions, it is accomplished by the couple standing under the canopy along with the rabbi who weds them; however, there are other views.

== Customs ==
A traditional chuppah, especially in Orthodox Judaism, recommends that there be open sky exactly above the chuppah, although this is not mandatory among Sephardic communities. If the wedding ceremony is held indoors in a hall, sometimes a special opening is built to be opened during the ceremony. Many Hasidim prefer to conduct the entire ceremony outdoors. It is said that the couple's ancestors are present at the chuppah ceremony.

In Yemenite communities, the practice was not for the groom and his bride to stand under a canopy (chuppah) hung on four poles, as is widely practised today in Jewish weddings, but rather to be secluded in a bridal chamber that was, in effect, a highly decorated room in the house of the groom, known as the chuppah (see Yichud).

== History and legal aspects ==
The word chuppah appears in the Hebrew Bible, for example in Joel 2:16 and Psalms 19:5. Abraham P. Bloch states that the connection between the term chuppah and the wedding ceremony "can be traced to the Bible"; however, "the physical appearance of the chuppah and its religious significance have undergone many changes since then".

There were for centuries regional differences in what constituted a huppah. Indeed, Solomon Freehof finds that the wedding canopy was unknown before the 16th century. Alfred J. Kolatch notes that it was during the Middle Ages that the "chupa ... in use today" became customary. Daniel Sperber notes that for many communities before the 16th century, the huppah consisted of a veil worn by the bride. In others, it was a cloth spread over the shoulders of the bride and groom.

Numerous illustrations of Jewish weddings in medieval Europe, North Africa and Italy show no evidence of a huppah as it is known today. Moses Isserles (1520–1572) notes that the portable marriage canopy was widely adopted by Ashkenazi Jews as a symbol of the chamber within which marriages originally took place in the generation before he composed his commentary to the Shulchan Aruch.

In Biblical times, a couple consummated their marriage in a room or tent. In Talmudic times, the room where the marriage was consummated was called the chuppah. There is however a reference of a wedding canopy in the Babylonian Talmud, Gittin 57a: "It was the custom when a boy was born to plant a cedar tree and when a girl was born to plant a pine tree, and when they married, the tree was cut down and a canopy made of the branches".

Jewish weddings consist of two separate parts: the erusin or betrothal, and the actual ceremony, known as the nessuin. The betrothal ceremony, which is today accomplished when the groom gives a wedding ring to the bride, prohibits her to all other men and cannot be dissolved without a get or religious divorce. The second ceremony, the nessuin, permits the bride to her husband.

Originally, the two ceremonies usually took place separately. After the betrothal, the bride lived with her parents until the day the actual marriage ceremony arrived; the wedding ceremony would then take place in a room or tent that the groom had set up for her. After the ceremony the bride and groom would spend an hour together in an ordinary room, and then the bride would enter the chuppah and, after gaining her permission, the groom would join her.

In the Middle Ages these two stages were increasingly combined into a single ceremony (which, from the 16th century, became the "all but universal Jewish custom" and the chuppah lost its original meaning, with various other customs replacing it. Indeed, in post-talmudic times the use of the chuppa chamber ceased; the custom that became most common instead was to "perform the whole combined ceremony under a canopy, to which the term chuppah was then applied, and to regard the bride's entry under the canopy as a symbol of the consummation of the marriage. The canopy "created the semblance of a room".

There are varying legal opinions as to how the chuppah ceremony is to be performed today. Major opinions include standing under the canopy, and secluding the couple together in a room (yichud). The betrothal and chuppah ceremonies are separated by the reading of the ketubah.

This chuppah ceremony is connected to the seven blessings which are recited over a cup of wine after the ceremony (birchat nisuin or sheva brachot).

== Symbolism ==
The chuppah represents a Jewish home symbolized by the cloth canopy and the four poles. Just as a chuppah is open on all four sides, so was the tent of Abraham open for hospitality. Thus, the chuppah represents hospitality to one's guests. This "home" initially lacks furniture as a reminder that the basis of a Jewish home is the people within it, not the possessions. In a spiritual sense, the covering of the chuppah represents the presence of God over the covenant of marriage. As the kippah served as a reminder of the Creator above all, (also a symbol of separation from God), so the chuppah was erected to signify that the ceremony and institution of marriage has divine origins.

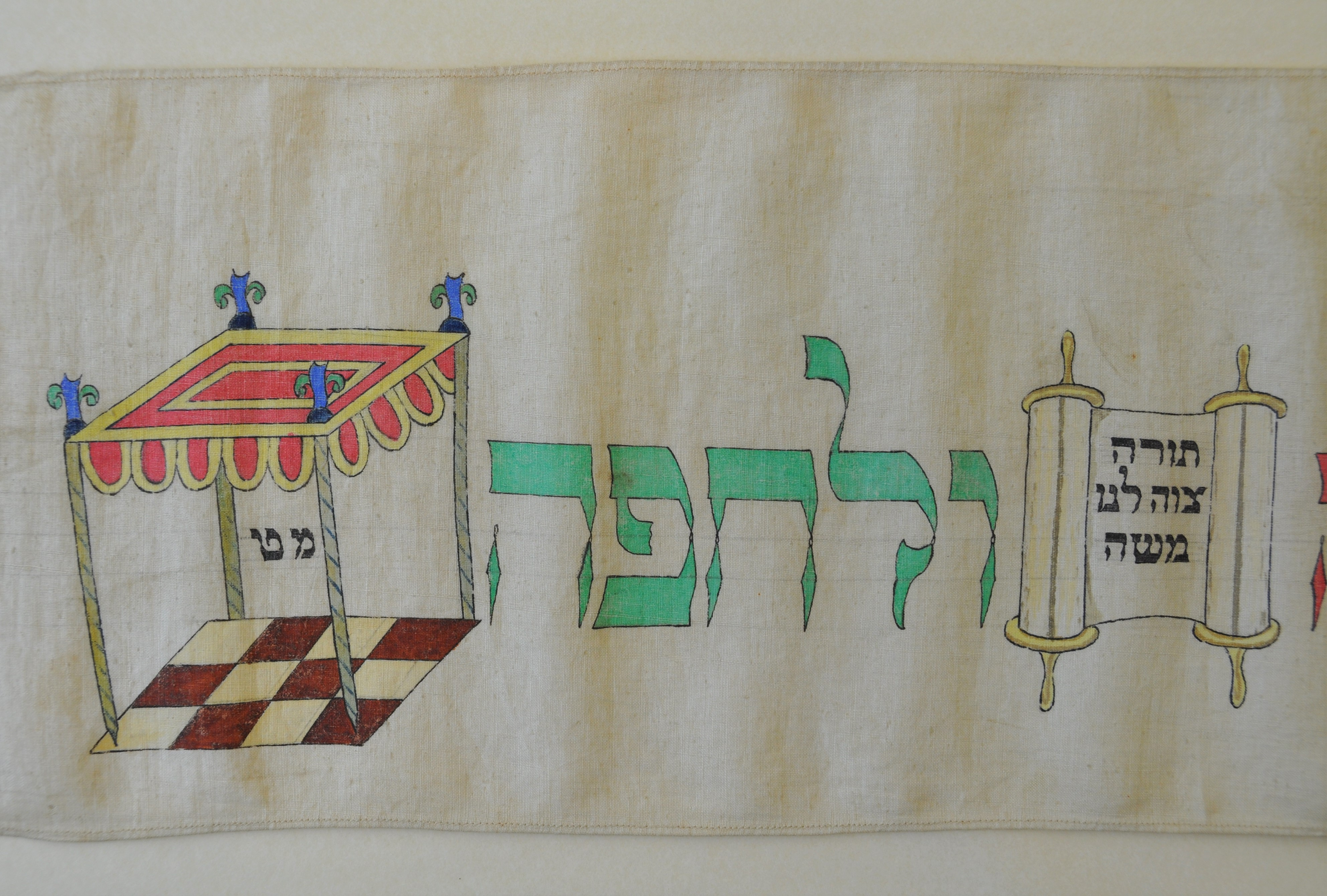
Detail of Chuppah and Torah scroll on a painted wimpel from the Lengnau collection, 1886, in the Jewish Museum of Switzerland

The symbol of the chuppah is often painted or embroidered onto wimpels after a boy’s Brit Milah ceremony. Here, the chuppah is a reference to a wish for the boy’s life to be under the guidance of God and for him to have a traditional marriage and family (also expressed in a blessing).

In Ashkenazic communities, before going under the chuppah the groom covers the bride's face with a veil, known as the badeken (in Yiddish) or hinuma (in Hebrew). The origin of this tradition and its original purpose are in dispute. There are opinions that the chuppah means "covering the bride's face", hence covering the couple to be married. Others suggest that the purpose was for others to witness the act of covering, formalizing the family's home in a community, as it is a public part of the wedding. In Sephardic communities, this custom is not practiced. Instead, underneath the chuppah, the couple is wrapped together underneath a tallit, which is a fringed garment.

The groom enters the chuppah first to represent his ownership of the home on behalf of the couple. When the bride then enters the chuppah it is as though the groom is providing her with shelter or clothing, and he thus publicly demonstrates his new responsibilities toward her.

== Modern trends ==
A chuppah can be made of any material. A tallit or embroidered velvet cloth are commonly used. Silk or quilted chuppot are increasingly common, and can often be customized or personalized to suit the couple's unique interests and occupations.

== See also ==
- Care cloth
- Jewish wedding
- Mandap
- Poruwa Ceremony
