= Veil =

Hanging cloth covering parts of a person or object

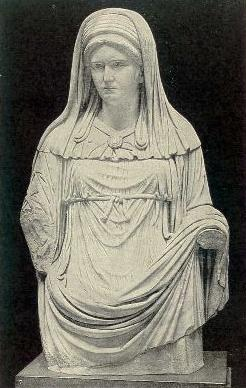
Roman statue of a veiled Vestal Virgin

A veil is an article of clothing or hanging cloth that is intended to cover some part of the head or face, or an object of some significance. Veiling has a long history in European, Asian, and African societies. The practice has been prominent in different forms in Judaism, Christianity, and Islam. The practice of veiling is especially associated with women and sacred objects, though in some cultures, it is men, rather than women, who are expected to wear a veil. Besides its enduring religious significance, veiling continues to play a role in some modern secular contexts, such as wedding customs.

== History ==
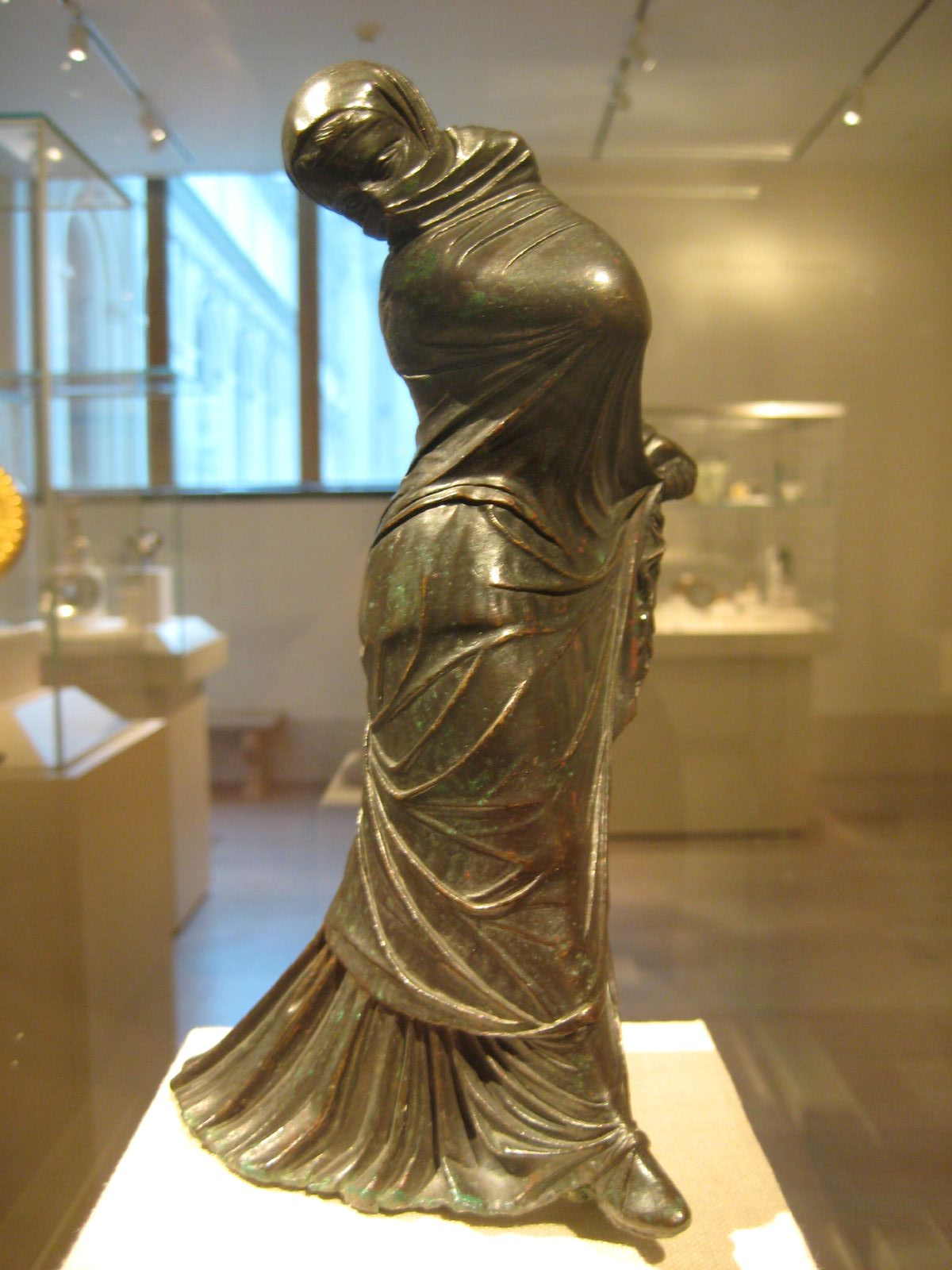
Greek bronze statuette of a veiled and masked dancer, 2nd–3rd century BC.

=== Antiquity ===
Elite women in ancient Mesopotamia and in the Macedonian and Persian empires wore the veil as a sign of respectability and high status. The earliest attested reference to veiling is found in a Middle Assyrian law code dating from between 1400 and 1100 BC. Assyria had explicit sumptuary laws detailing which women must veil and which women must not, depending upon the woman's class, rank, and occupation in society. Female slaves and prostitutes were forbidden to veil and faced harsh penalties if they did so. The Middle Assyrian law code states:

§ 40. A wife-of-a-man, or [widows], or [Assyrian] women who go out into the main thoroughfare [shall not have] their heads [bare]. […] A prostitute shall not veil herself, her head shall be bare. Whoever sees a veiled prostitute shall seize her, secure witnesses, and bring her to the palace entrance. They shall not take her jewellery; he who has seized her shall take her clothing; they shall strike her 50 blows with rods; they shall pour hot pitch over her head. And if a man should see a veiled prostitute and release her and not bring her to the palace entrance: they shall strike that man 50 blows with rods; the one who informs against him shall take his clothing; they shall pierce his ears, thread (them) on a cord, tie (it) at his back; he shall perform the king's service for one full month. Slave-women shall not veil themselves, and he who should see a veiled slave-woman shall seize her and bring her to the palace entrance: they shall cut off her ears; he who seizes her shall take her clothing.

Veiling not only was thus a marker of aristocratic rank, but also served to "differentiate between 'respectable' women and those who were publicly available". The veiling of matrons was also customary in ancient Greece. Between 550 and 323 B.C.E respectable women in classical Greek society were expected to seclude themselves and wear clothing that concealed them from the eyes of strange men.

The Mycenaean Greek term 𐀀𐀢𐀒𐀺𐀒, a-pu-ko-wo-ko, possibly meaning "headband makers" or "craftsmen of horse veil", and written in Linear B syllabic script, is also attested since ca. 1300 BC. In ancient Greek the word for veil was καλύπτρα (kalyptra; Ionic Greek: καλύπτρη, kalyptrē; from the verb καλύπτω, kalyptō, "I cover").

Classical Greek and Hellenistic statues sometimes depict Greek women with both their head and face covered by a veil. Caroline Galt and Lloyd Llewellyn-Jones have both argued from such representations and literary references that it was commonplace for women (at least those of higher status) in ancient Greece to cover their hair and face in public. Roman women were expected to wear veils as a symbol of the husband's authority over his wife; a married woman who omitted the veil was seen as withdrawing herself from marriage. In 166 BC, consul Sulpicius Gallus divorced his wife because she had left the house unveiled, thus allowing all to see, as he said, what only he should see. Unmarried girls normally did not veil their heads, but matrons did so to show their modesty and chastity, their pudicitia. Veils also protected women against the evil eye, it was thought.

A veil called flammeum was the most prominent feature of the costume worn by the bride at Roman weddings. The veil was a deep yellow color reminiscent of a candle flame. The flammeum also evoked the veil of the Flaminica Dialis, the Roman priestess who could not divorce her husband, the high priest of Jupiter, and thus was seen as a good omen for lifelong fidelity to one man. The Romans apparently thought of the bride as being "clouded over with a veil" and connected the verb nubere (to be married) with nubes, the word for cloud.

Intermixing of populations resulted in a convergence of the cultural practices of Greek, Persian, and Mesopotamian empires and the Semitic-speaking peoples of the Middle East. With the spread of Christianity, the ordinance of headcovering by women became normative throughout Christendom because it was enjoined in the Bible and by the Church Fathers. Veiling and seclusion of women appear to have established themselves among Jews and Christians, before spreading to urban Arabs of the upper classes and eventually among the urban masses. In the rural areas it was common to cover the hair, but not the face.

=== Later history ===
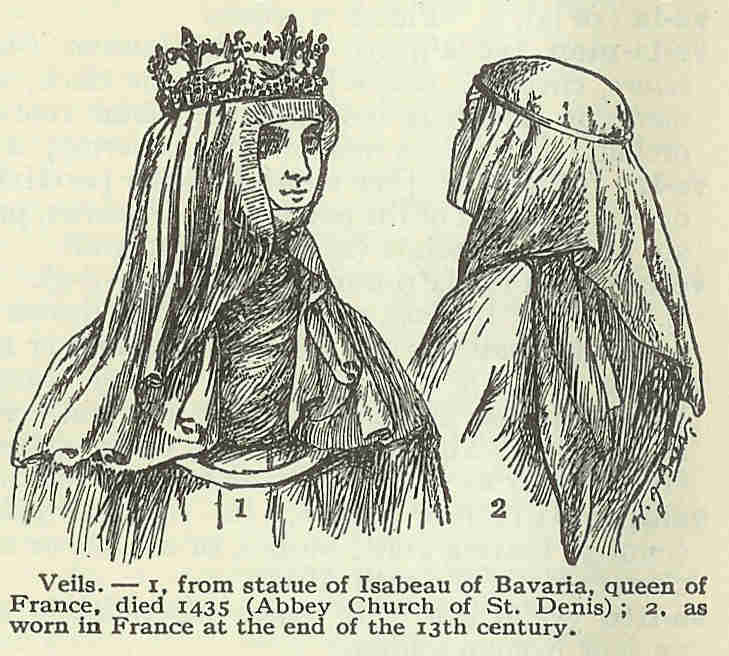
Depiction of Isabeau of Bavaria, queen of France, wearing veiling

For many centuries, until around 1175, Anglo-Saxon and then Anglo-Norman women, with the exception of young unmarried girls, wore veils that entirely covered their hair, and often their necks up to their chins (see wimple). Only in the Tudor period (1485), when hoods became increasingly popular, did veils of this type become less common. This varied greatly from one country to another. In Italy, veils, including face veils, were worn in some regions until the 1970s. Women in southern Italy often covered their heads to show that they were modest, well-behaved and pious. They generally wore a cuffia (cap), then the fazzoletto (kerchief/head scarves) a long triangular or rectangular piece of cloth that could be tied in various ways, and sometimes covered the whole face except the eyes, sometimes bende (lit. swaddles, bandages) or a wimple underneath too.

For centuries, European women have worn sheer veils, but only under certain circumstances. Sometimes a veil of this type was draped over and pinned to the bonnet or hat of a woman in mourning, especially at the funeral and during the subsequent period of "high mourning". They would also have been used, as an alternative to a mask, as a simple method of hiding the identity of a woman who was traveling to meet a lover, or doing anything she did not want other people to find out about. More pragmatically, veils were also sometimes worn to protect the complexion from sun and wind damage (when untanned skin was fashionable), or to keep dust out of a woman's face, much as the keffiyeh (worn by men) is used today.

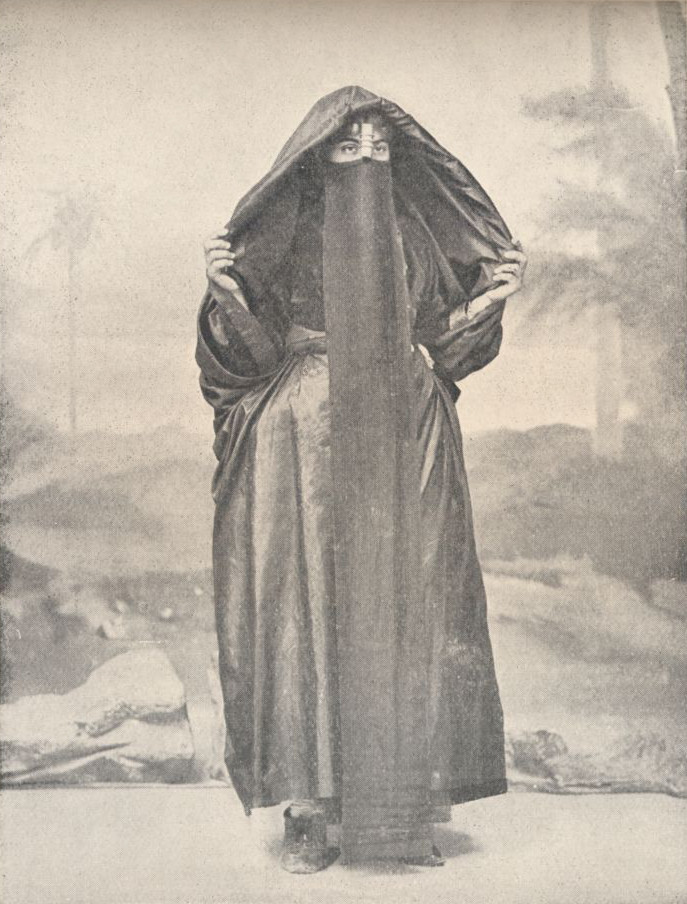
Coptic woman wearing a veil (1918)

In Judaism, Christianity, and Islam the concept of covering the head is or was associated with propriety and modesty. Most traditional depictions of the Virgin Mary, the mother of Christ, show her veiled. During the Middle Ages most European married women covered their hair rather than their face, with a variety of styles of wimple, kerchiefs and headscarves. Veiling, covering the hair, was the normative practice of Christian women until at least the 19th century and still extant in certain regions, in accordance with Christian teaching delineated by Saint Paul in 1 Corinthians 11. While in the Western world this practice largely lapsed in the 1960s with the rise of the sexual revolution, traditional congregations, such as those of Conservative Anabaptist Christians, as well as certain Oriental Orthodox Christians and Eastern Orthodox Christians, continue observing the ordinance of headcovering. Other Christian women, including certain Catholic and Lutheran, as well as certain conservative Reformed Christian women (such as those belonging to the Heritage Reformed Congregations or Free Presbyterian Church of North America), continue to wear a headcovering at least during prayer and worship. Lace face-veils are often worn by female relatives at funerals in some Catholic countries. In Orthodox Judaism, married women cover their hair for reasons of modesty; many Orthodox Jewish women wear headscarves (tichel) for this purpose.

Christian Byzantine literature expressed rigid norms pertaining to veiling of women, which have been influenced by Persian traditions, although there is evidence to suggest that they differed significantly from actual practice. Since Islam identified with the monotheistic religions practiced in the Byzantine and Sasanian empires, in the aftermath of the early Muslim conquests veiling of women was adopted as an appropriate expression of Qur'anic ideals regarding modesty and piety. Veiling gradually spread to upper-class Arab women, and eventually, it became widespread among Muslim women in cities throughout the Middle East. Veiling of Arab Muslim women became especially pervasive under Ottoman rule as a mark of rank and exclusive lifestyle, and Istanbul of the 17th century witnessed differentiated dress styles that reflected geographical and occupational identities. Women in rural areas were much slower to adopt veiling because the garments interfered with their work in the fields. Since wearing a veil was impractical for working women, "a veiled woman silently announced that her husband was rich enough to keep her idle." By the 19th century, upper-class urban Muslim and Christian women in Egypt wore a garment which included a head cover and a burqa (muslin cloth that covered the lower nose and the mouth). Up to the first half of the twentieth century, rural women in the Maghreb and Egypt put on a face veil when they visited urban areas, "as a sign of civilization". The practice of veiling gradually declined in much of the Muslim world during the 20th century before making a comeback in recent decades. The choice, or the forced option for women to veil remains controversial, whether a personal choice as an outward sign of religious devotion, or a forced one because of extremist groups that require a veil, under severe penalty, even death. The motives and reasons for wearing a hijab are wide and various, but ultimately depend on each individual person's situation and can not be said to come from any one distinct reason or motive. Although religion can be a common reason for choosing to veil, the practice also reflects political and personal conviction, so that it can serve as a medium through which personal choices can be revealed, in countries where veiling is indeed a choice, such as Turkey.

=== Veils for men ===
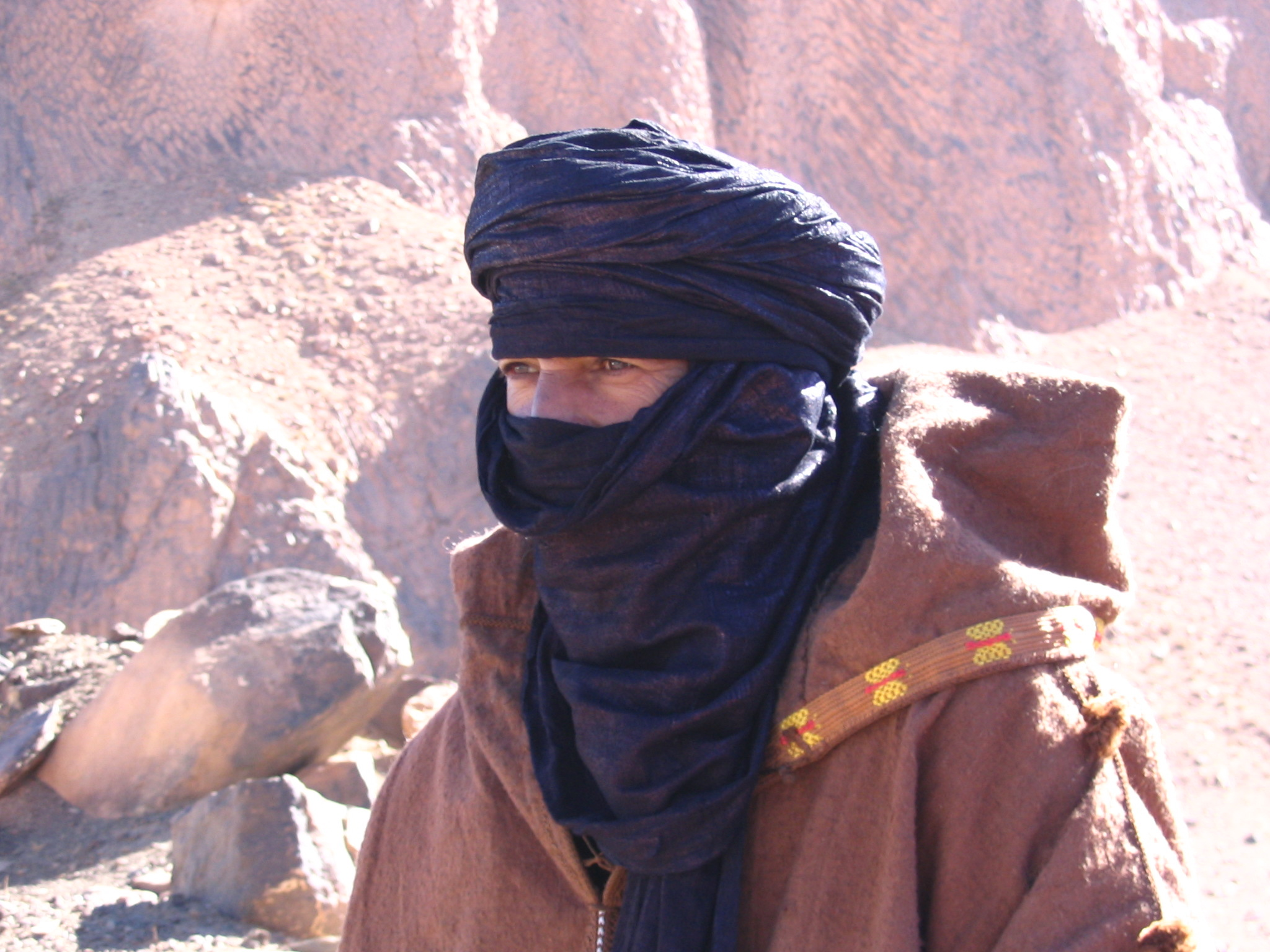
Tuareg man wearing a veil

Among the Tuareg, Songhai, Hausa, and Fulani of West Africa, women do not traditionally wear the veil, while men do. Male veiling was also common among the Berber Sanhaja tribes. The North African male veil, which covers the mouth and sometimes part of the nose, is called litham in Arabic and tagelmust by the Tuareg. Tuareg boys start wearing the veil at the onset of puberty and veiling is regarded as a mark of manhood. It is considered improper for a man to appear unveiled in front of elders, especially those from his wife's family.

Ancient African rock engravings depicting human faces with eyes but no mouth or nose suggest that the origins of litham are pre-Islamic and even pre-historic. Wearing of the litham is not viewed as a religious requirement, although it was apparently believed to provide magical protection against evil forces. In practice, the litham has served as protection from the dust and extremes of temperature characterizing the desert environment. Its use by the Almoravids gave it a political significance during their conquests.

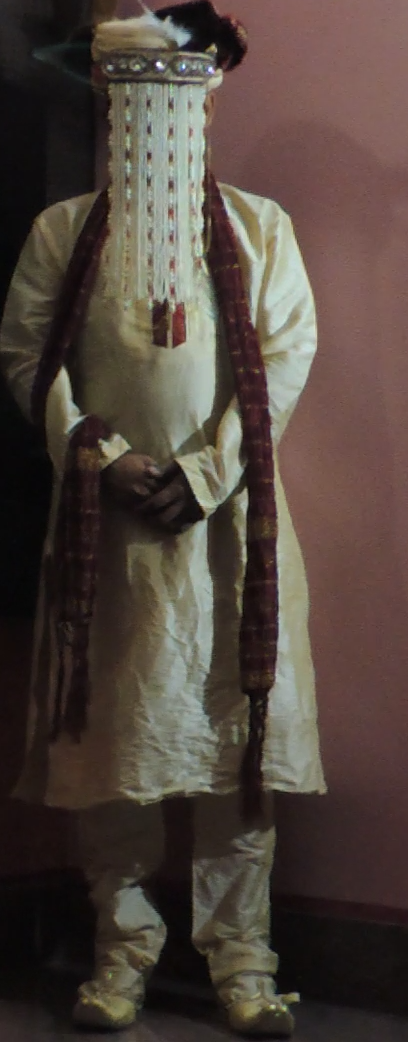
Indian groom in traditional attire, with Sherwani, Sehra and Mojdi

In some parts of India, Pakistan, Bangladesh, and Nepal, men wear a sehra (headdress) on their wedding day. This is a male veil covering the whole face and neck. The sehra is made from either flowers or beads. The most common sehra is made from fresh marigolds. The groom wears this throughout the day concealing his face even during the wedding ceremony. In Northern India today, grooms can be seen arriving on a horse with the sehra wrapped around the head.

== Veiling and religion ==
=== Biblical references ===
Biblical references include:

- Hebrew: מטפחת mitpachat (Ruth 3:15; marg., "sheet" or "apron;" R.V., "mantle"). In Isaiah 3:22, this word is plural, rendered "wimples;" R.V., "shawls", i. e., wraps.
- Massekah (Isaiah 25:7; in Isaiah 28:20 rendered "covering"). The word denotes something spread out and covering or concealing something else (compare with 2 Corinthians 3:13–15).
- Masveh (Exodus 34:33, 35), the veil on the face of Moses. This verse should be read, "And when Moses had done speaking with them, he put a veil on his face", as in the Revised Version. When Moses spoke to them, he was without the veil; only when he ceased speaking, he put on the veil (compare with 2 Corinthians 3:13).
- Parochet (Exodus 26:31–35), the veil of the tabernacle and the temple, which hung between the holy place and the most holy (2 Chronicles 3:14). In the temple, a partition wall separated these two places. In it were two folding doors, which are supposed to have been always open, the entrance being concealed by the veil which the high priest lifted when he entered into the sanctuary on the Day of Atonement. This veil was rent when Christ died on the cross (Matthew 27:51; Mark 15:38; Luke 23:45).
- Tza'iph (Genesis 24:65). Rebecca "took a veil and covered herself". (See also Genesis 38:14,19) Hebrew women generally appeared in public with the face visible (Genesis 12:14; 24:16; 29:10; 1 Samuel 1:12).
- Radhidh (Song of Solomon 5:7, R.V. "mantle;" Isaiah 3:23). The word probably denotes some kind of cloak or wrapper.
- Masak, the veil which hung before the entrance to the holy place (Exodus 26:36–37).

Note: Genesis 20:16, which the King James Version renders as: "And unto Sarah he said, Behold, I have given thy brother a thousand pieces of silver: Behold, he is to thee a covering of the eyes, unto all that are with thee, and with all other: Thus, she was reproved" has been interpreted in one source as implied advice to Sarah to conform to a supposed custom of married women, and wear a complete veil, covering the eyes as well as the rest of the face, but the phrase is generally taken to refer not to Sarah's eyes, but to the eyes of others, and to be merely a metaphorical expression concerning vindication of Sarah (NASB, RSV), silencing criticism (GWT), allaying suspicions (NJB), righting a wrong (BBE, NLT), covering or recompensing the problem caused her (NIV, New Life Version, NIRV, TNIV, JB), a sign of her innocence (ESV, CEV, HCSB). The final phrase in the verse, which KJV takes to mean, "she was reproved", is taken by almost all other versions to mean instead, "she was vindicated", and the word "הוא", which KJV interprets as "he" (Abraham), is interpreted as "it" (the money). Thus, the general view is that this passage has nothing to do with material veils.

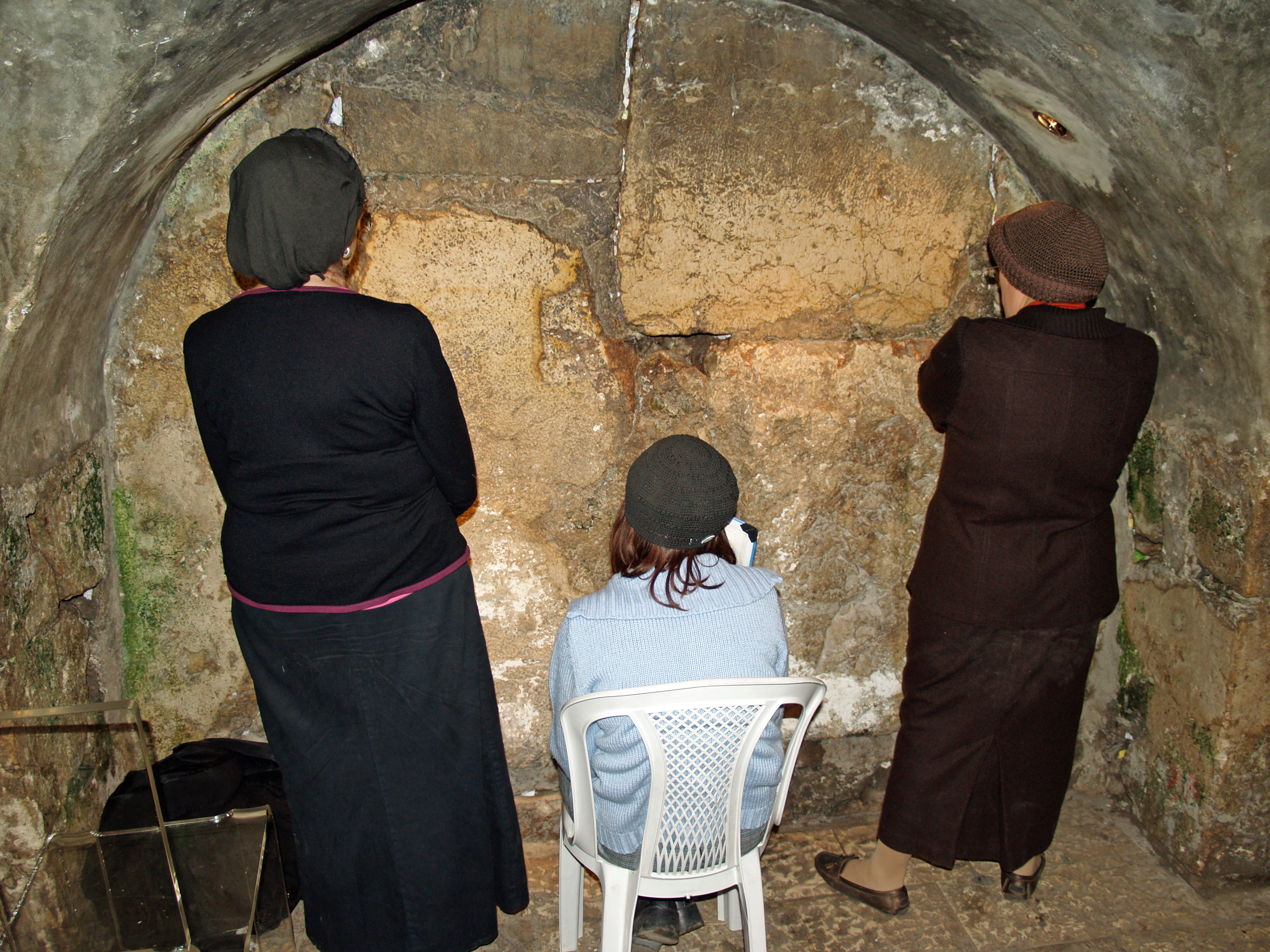
Praying Jewish woman wearing Tichel

=== Judaism ===
After the destruction of the Temple in Jerusalem, the synagogues that were established took the design of the Tabernacle as their plan. The Ark of the Law, which contains the scrolls of the Torah, is covered with an embroidered curtain or veil called a parokhet. (See also below regarding the traditional Jewish custom of veiling – and unveiling – the bride.)

=== Christianity ===
==== Veiling of women ====
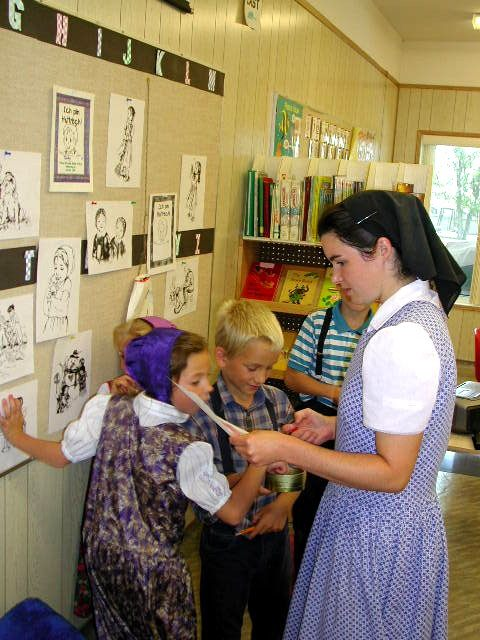
A Hutterite teacher wearing an hanging veil, which is worn throughout the day

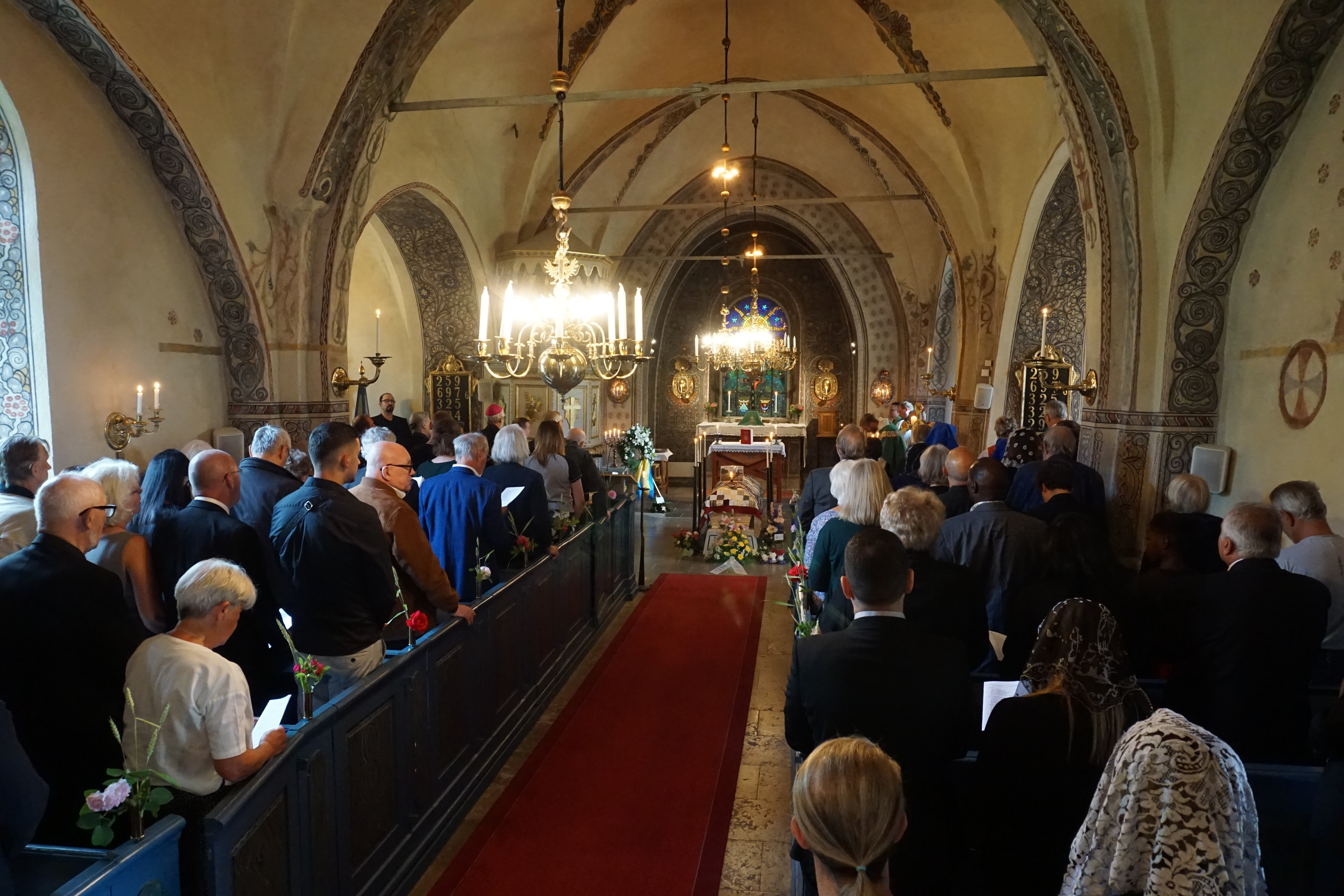
A number of Evangelical-Lutheran women veiling during Mass at Alsike Church, Sweden (2023)

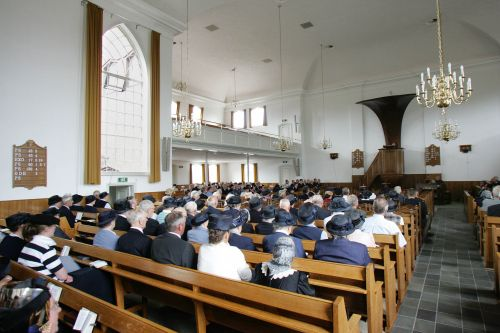
Headcovering in the Restored Reformed Church of Doornspijk

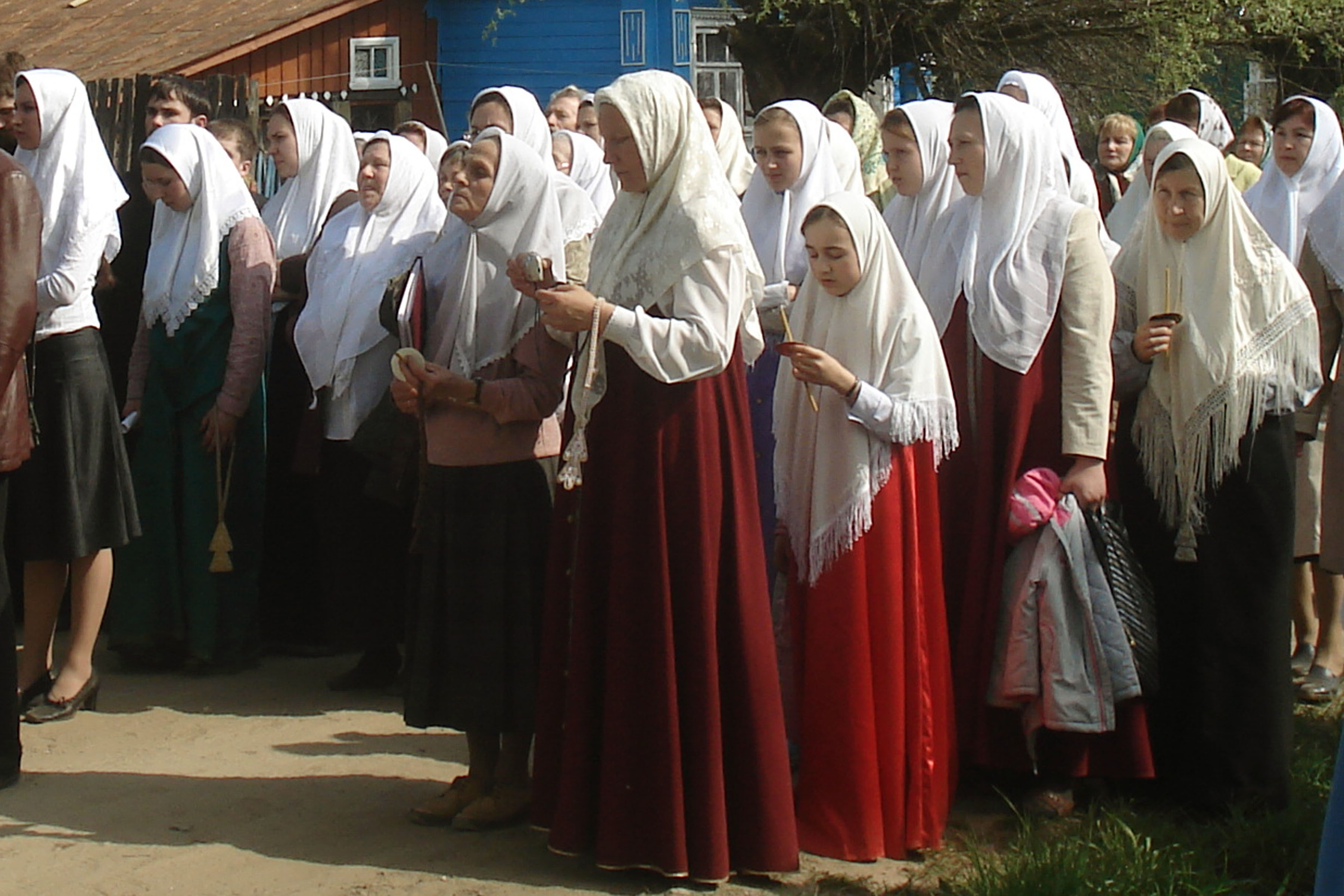
Women of the Russian Orthodox Old-Rite Church wearing headscarves

Traditionally, in Christianity, women were enjoined to cover their heads, and men were instructed to remove their hat when praying or prophesying. Wearing a veil (also known as a headcovering) is seen as a sign of humility before God, as well as a reminder of the bridal relationship between Christ and the church. This practice is based on 1 Corinthians 11:4–15 in the Christian Bible, where St. Paul writes:

^{2}I commend you because you remember me in everything and maintain the traditions even as I have delivered them to you. ^{3}But I want you to understand that the head of every man is Christ, the head of a woman is her husband, and the head of Christ is God. ^{4}Any man who prays or prophesies with his head covered dishonors his head, ^{5}but any woman who prays or prophesies with her head unveiled dishonors her head—it is the same as if her head were shaven. ^{6}For if a woman will not veil herself, then she should cut off her hair; but if it is disgraceful for a woman to be shorn or shaven, let her wear a veil. ^{7}For a man ought not to cover his head, since he is the image and glory of God; but woman is the glory of man. ^{8}(For man was not made from woman, but woman from man. ^{9}Neither was man created for woman, but woman for man.) ^{10}That is why a woman ought to have a veil on her head, because of the angels. ^{11}(Nevertheless, in the Lord woman is not independent of man nor man of woman; ^{12}for as woman was made from man, so man is now born of woman. And all things are from God.) ^{13}Judge for yourselves; is it proper for a woman to pray to God with her head uncovered? ^{14}Does not nature itself teach you that for a man to wear long hair is degrading to him, ^{15}but if a woman has long hair, it is her pride? For her hair is given to her for a covering. ^{16}If any one is disposed to be contentious, we recognize no other practice, nor do the churches of God.

— 1 Corinthians 11:2-16, Revised Standard Version

The early Church Fathers, including Tertullian of Carthage, Clement of Alexandria, Hippolytus of Rome, John Chrysostom and Augustine of Hippo attested in their writings that men should pray uncovered, and that women should wear a headcovering. John Chrysostom (c. 347 – 407) delineated Saint Paul's teaching on the wearing of headcoverings by Christian women, continually:

Well then: the man he compelleth not to be always uncovered, but only when he prays. "For every man," saith he, "praying or prophesying, having his head covered, dishonoureth his head." But the woman he commands to be at all times covered. Wherefore also having said, "Every woman that prayeth or prophesieth with her head unveiled, dishonoureth her head," he stayed not at this point only, but also proceeded to say, "for it is one and the same thing as if she were shaven." But if to be shaven is always dishonourable, it is plain too that being uncovered is always a reproach. And not even with this only was he content, but he added again, saying, "The woman ought to have a sign of authority on her head, because of the angels." He signifies that not at the time of prayer only but also continually, she ought to be covered. But with regard to the man, it is no longer about covering but about wearing long hair, that he so forms his discourse. To be covered he then only forbids, when a man is praying; but the wearing of long hair he discourages at all times.

For he said not merely covered, but covered over, meaning that she be with all care sheltered from view on every side. And by reducing it to an absurdity, he appeals to their shame, saying by way of severe reprimand, but if she be not covered, let her also be shorn. As if he had said, "If thou cast away the covering appointed by the law of God, cast away likewise that appointed by nature."

Additionally, the Church Fathers taught that because the hair of a woman has sexual potency, it should only be for her husband to see and covered the rest of the time. In Western Europe and North America, from the arrival of Christianity to those lands to the mid-20th century, women in most mainstream Christian denominations wore head coverings (often in the form of a scarf, cap, veil or hat). These included many Anglican, Baptist, Catholic, Lutheran, Methodist, Moravian, and Reformed (including Continental Reformed, Congregationalist and Presbyterian traditions) Churches. In these denominations, the practice now continues in certain congregations and by individuals who have sought to follow the precedent set in Scripture and church history.

Christian veiling throughout the day is still practiced by those who wear plain dress, such as traditional Anabaptists including Mennonites (Old Order Mennonites and Conservative Mennonites), Hutterites, Schwarzenau Brethren (Old Order Schwarzenau Brethren and Dunkard Brethren Church), River Brethren (Old Order River Brethren and Calvary Holiness Church), Apostolic Christians, Amish (Old Order Amish, New Order Amish, Para-Amish and Beachy Amish), and Charity Christians, as well as Conservative Quakers.

Many Holiness Christians who practice the doctrine of outward holiness, also practice headcovering (such as the Calvary Holiness Church). The Plymouth Brethren and conservative Reformed and Presbyterian churches, along with Traditionalist Catholics and Traditionalist Evangelical-Lutherans, practice headcovering when praying at home and while attending public liturgies. In many Oriental Orthodox Churches and certain Eastern Orthodox congregations, the custom of women's covering their heads continues in church (and when praying privately at home).

==== Veiling of nuns and consecrated virgins ====
A veil forms part of the headdress of some orders of nuns or religious sisters in Catholicism, Lutheranism and Anglicanism; this is why a woman who becomes a nun is said "to take the veil". In medieval times married women normally covered their hair outside the house, and a nun's veil is based on secular medieval styles, often reflecting the fashion of widows in their attire. In many institutes, a white veil is used for the canonical novitiate, in some orders also for the time during the temporary vows.

A black veil is the traditional sign of a professed nun. Some monasteries or communities bestow the black veil at the first profession of vows, but usually it is bestowed with the profession of solemn vows. When the vows have been professed the white veil of a novice will be swapped for the black veil of the professed, and she is usually crowned with a wreath of flowers.

A veil of consecration, longer and fuller, is used by some orders whose nuns receive the consecration of virgins who are already in solemn vows or who are being consecrated as a virgin in the same ceremony. References to "consecrated nuns" in medieval literature refers to solemnly professed nuns who received the consecration of virgins from their bishops, usually some years after their final profession of vows. The reintroduced rite of the consecration of virgins for women living in the world provides, as the Roman Ritual.

Since the reintroduction of the rite of consecration of virgins for women living in the world in 1970, the newly consecrated virgin receives a veil as a sign of her consecration, as in ancient times. The nuptial symbolism of the rite was displayed particularly in the bestowal of the veil on the virgin by the bishop, as can be found in the writings of Ambrose of Milan and in the oldest liturgical sources.

After the promulgation of Pope Paul VI's decree Perfectae caritatis on the adaption and renewal of religious life most monastic orders for nuns retained the veil. Regarding other institutes of religious sisters who work as teachers, nurses or in other active apostolates, some wear the veil, while some others have abolished the use of the veil.

The fullest versions of the nun's veil cover the top of the head and flow down around and over the shoulders. In western Christianity, it does not wrap around the neck or face. In those orders that retain one, the starched white covering about the face, neck, and shoulders is known as a wimple and is a separate garment.

The Catholic Church has revived the ancient practice of women to be consecrated by their bishop as a consecrated virgin living in the world. These virgins are set aside as sacred persons who belong only to Christ and the service of the church. The veil is a bridal one, because the velatio virginum primarily signified the newly consecrated virgin as the Bride of Christ. In ancient times his veil was called the flammeum because it was supposed to remind the virgin of the indissoluble nuptial bond she was contracting with Christ. The wearing of the flammeum for the sacred virgin Bride of Christ arose from the bridal attire of the strictest pagan marriage which did not permit of divorce at the time. The flammeum was a visible reminder that divorce was not possible with Christ, their Divine spouse.

In Eastern Orthodoxy and in the Eastern Rites of the Catholic Church, a veil called an epanokamelavkion is used by both nuns and monks, in both cases covering completely the kamilavkion, a cylindrical hat they both wear. In Slavic practice, when the veil is worn over the hat, the entire headdress is referred to as a klobuk. Nuns wear an additional veil under the klobuk, called an apostolnik, which is drawn together to cover the neck and shoulders as well as the head, leaving the face itself open.

Some female members of Lutheran and Anglican religious communities also wear a veil, differing according to the traditions of each community.

==== Veiling of objects ====
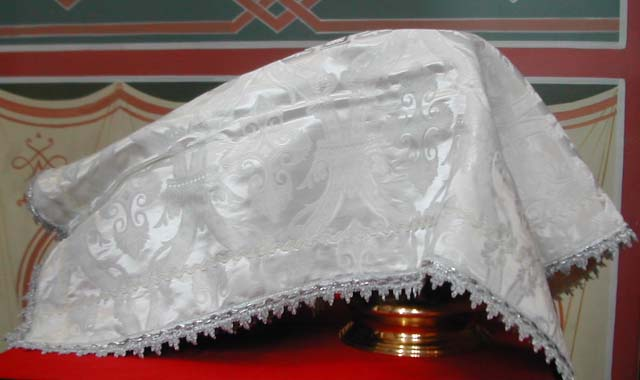
Aër covering a chalice and diskos on the prothesis

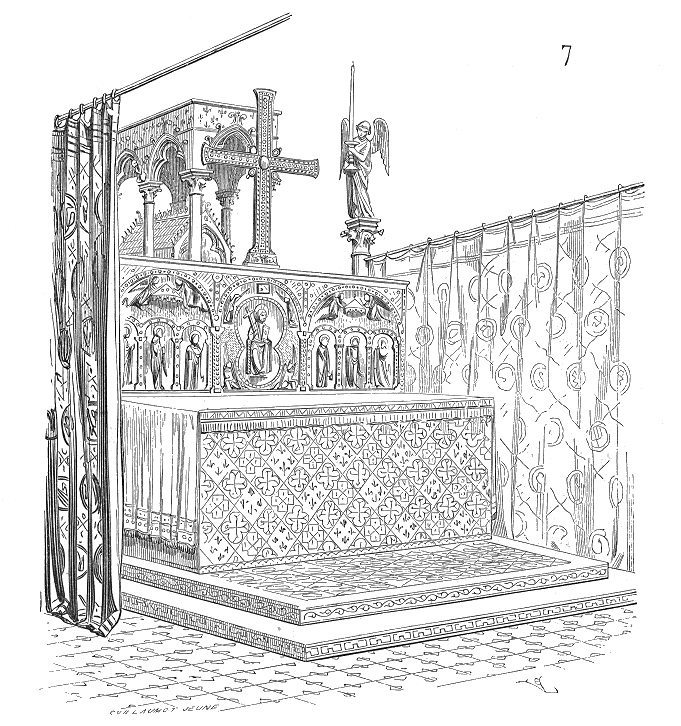
Sanctuary in the Basilique Saint-Denis showing veiling to either side of the altar

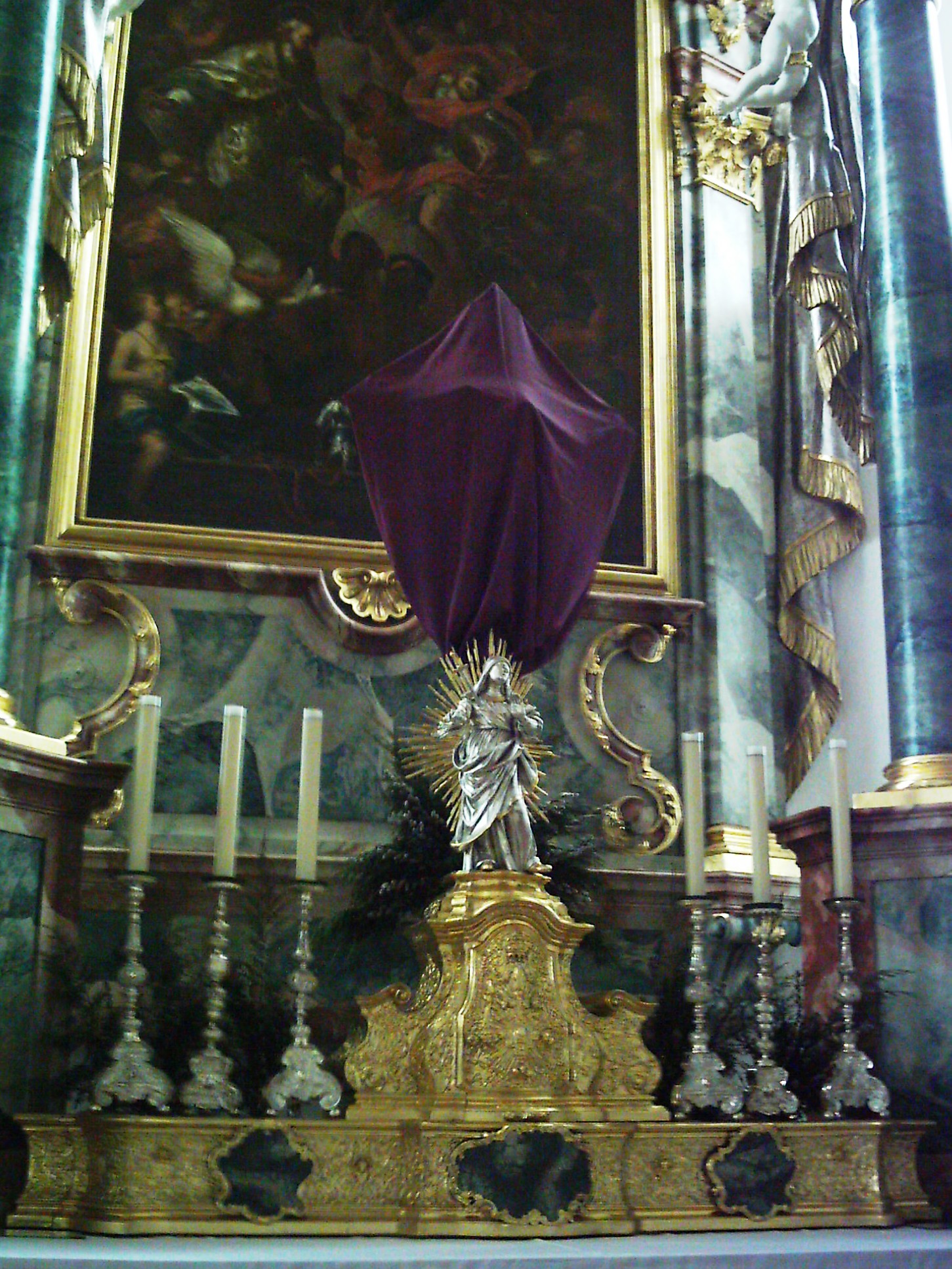
An altar cross veiled during Holy Week

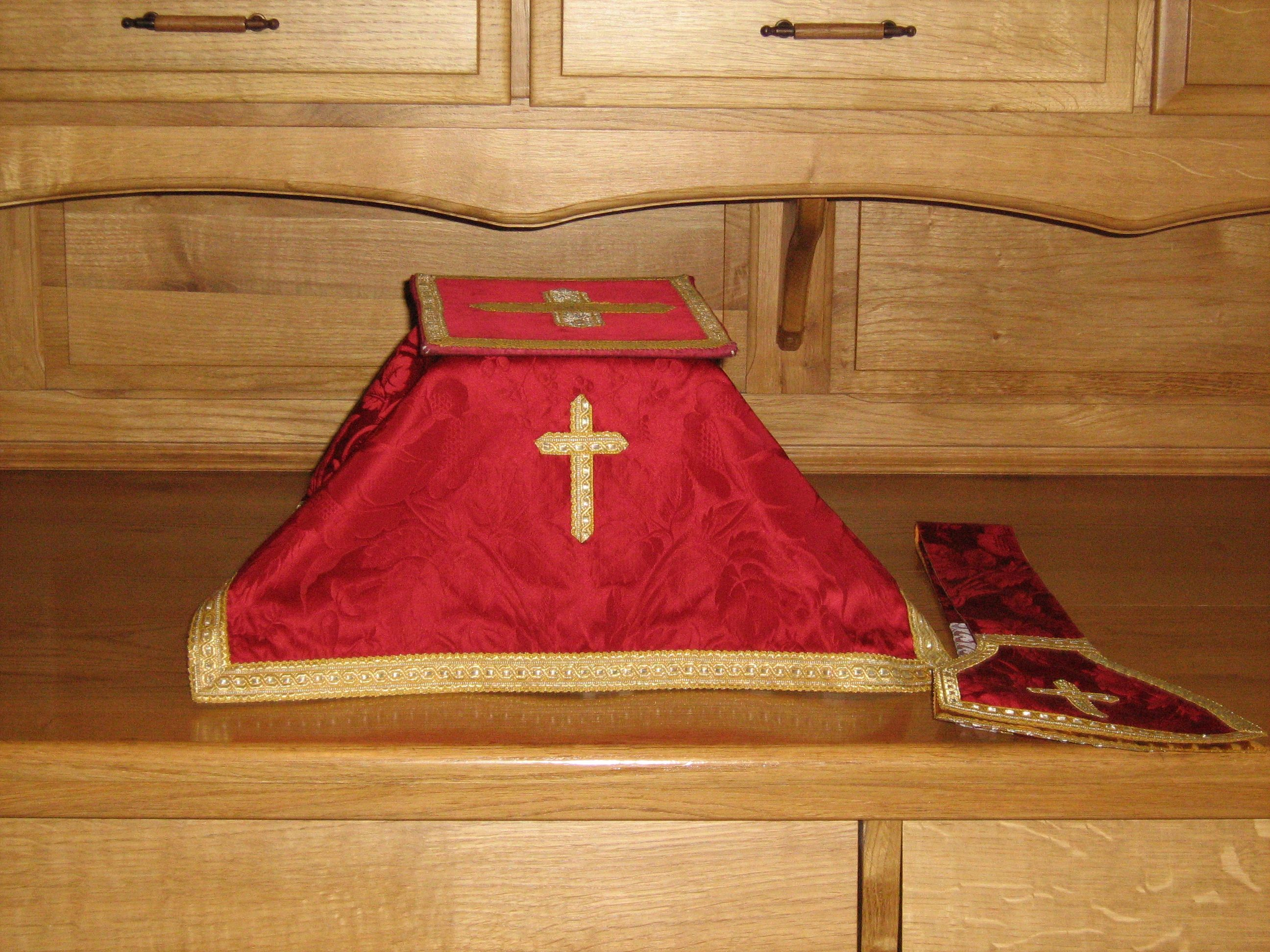
Western burse and chalice veil laid over the holy vessels

Among Christian churches which have a liturgical tradition, several different types of veils are used. These veils are often symbolically tied to the veils in the Tabernacle in the wilderness and in Solomon's Temple. The purpose of these veils was not so much to obscure as to shield the most sacred things from the eyes of sinful men. In Solomon's Temple the veil or parochet was placed between the "Inner Sanctuary" and the "Holy of Holies". According to the New Testament, this veil in the Second Temple was torn the moment Jesus Christ died on the cross.

Tabernacle veil
Used to cover the church tabernacle, particularly in the Roman Catholic tradition but in some others as well, when the Eucharist is actually stored in it. The veil is used to remind worshipers that the (usually metal) tabernacle cabinet echoes the tabernacle tent of the Hebrew Scriptures, and signals the tabernacle is actually in use. It may be of any liturgical color, but is most often white (always appropriate for the Eucharist), cloth of gold or silver (which may substitute for any liturgical color aside from violet), or the liturgical color of the day (red, green or violet). It may be simple, unadorned linen or of silk, and may be fringed or otherwise decorated. It is often designed to match the vestments of the celebrants.
Ciborium veil
The ciborium is a goblet-like metal vessel with a cover and usually cruciform knob on it, used in the Roman Catholic Church and some others to hold the consecrated hosts of the Eucharist when, for instance, it is stored in the tabernacle or when communion is to be distributed. It may be veiled with a white cloth, usually silk, and a hole for the top knob. This veiling was formerly required but is now optional. In part, it signals that the ciborium actually contains the consecrated Eucharist at the moment.
Chalice veil
During Eucharistic celebrations, a veil is often used to cover the chalice and paten to keep dust and flying insects away from the bread and wine. Often made of rich material, the chalice veils not only have a practical purpose, but are also intended to show honor to vessels used for the sacrament.
In the West, a single chalice veil is normally used. The veil will usually be the same material and color as the priest's vestments, though it may also be white. It covers the chalice and paten when not actually in use on the altar.
In the East, three veils are used: one for the chalice, one for the diskos (paten), and a third one (the Aër) is used to cover both. The veils for the chalice and diskos are usually square with four lappets hanging down the sides, so that when the veil is laid out flat it will be shaped like a cross. The Aër is rectangular and usually larger than the chalice veil used in the West. The Aër also figures prominently in other liturgical respects.
Humeral veil
The humeral veil is used in both Roman Catholic and Anglican Churches during the liturgy of Exposition and Benediction of the Blessed Sacrament, and on some other occasions when special respect is shown to the Eucharist. From the Latin for "shoulders," it is an oblong piece of cloth worn as a sort of shawl, used to symbolize a more profound awareness of the respect due to the Eucharist by shielding the celebrant's hands from actually contacting the vessel holding the Eucharist, either a monstrance or ciborium, or in some cases to shield the vessel itself from the eyes of participants. It is worn by only bishops, priests and deacons.
Vimpa
A vimpa is a veil or shawl worn over the shoulders of servers who carry the miter and crosier in Roman Catholic liturgical functions when they are not being used by the bishop.
Chancel veil
In the early liturgies, there was often a veil that separated the sanctuary from the rest of the church (again, based upon the biblical description of the Tabernacle). In the Byzantine liturgy this veil developed into the iconostasis, but a veil or curtain is still used behind the Royal Doors (the main doors leading into the sanctuary), and is opened and closed at specific times during the liturgy. In the West, it developed into the Rood Veil, and later the Rood Screen, and finally the chancel rail, the low sanctuary railing in those churches that still have this. In some of the Eastern Churches (for instance, the Syrian liturgy) the use of a veil across the entire sanctuary has been retained.
Lenten veiling
Some churches veil their crosses during Passiontide with a fine semi-transparent mesh. The color of the veil may be black, red, purple, or white, depending upon the liturgical day and practice of the church. In traditional churches, there will sometimes be curtains placed to either side of the altar.

The Veil of Our Lady is a liturgical feast celebrating the protection afforded by the intercessions of the Virgin Mary.

=== Islam ===
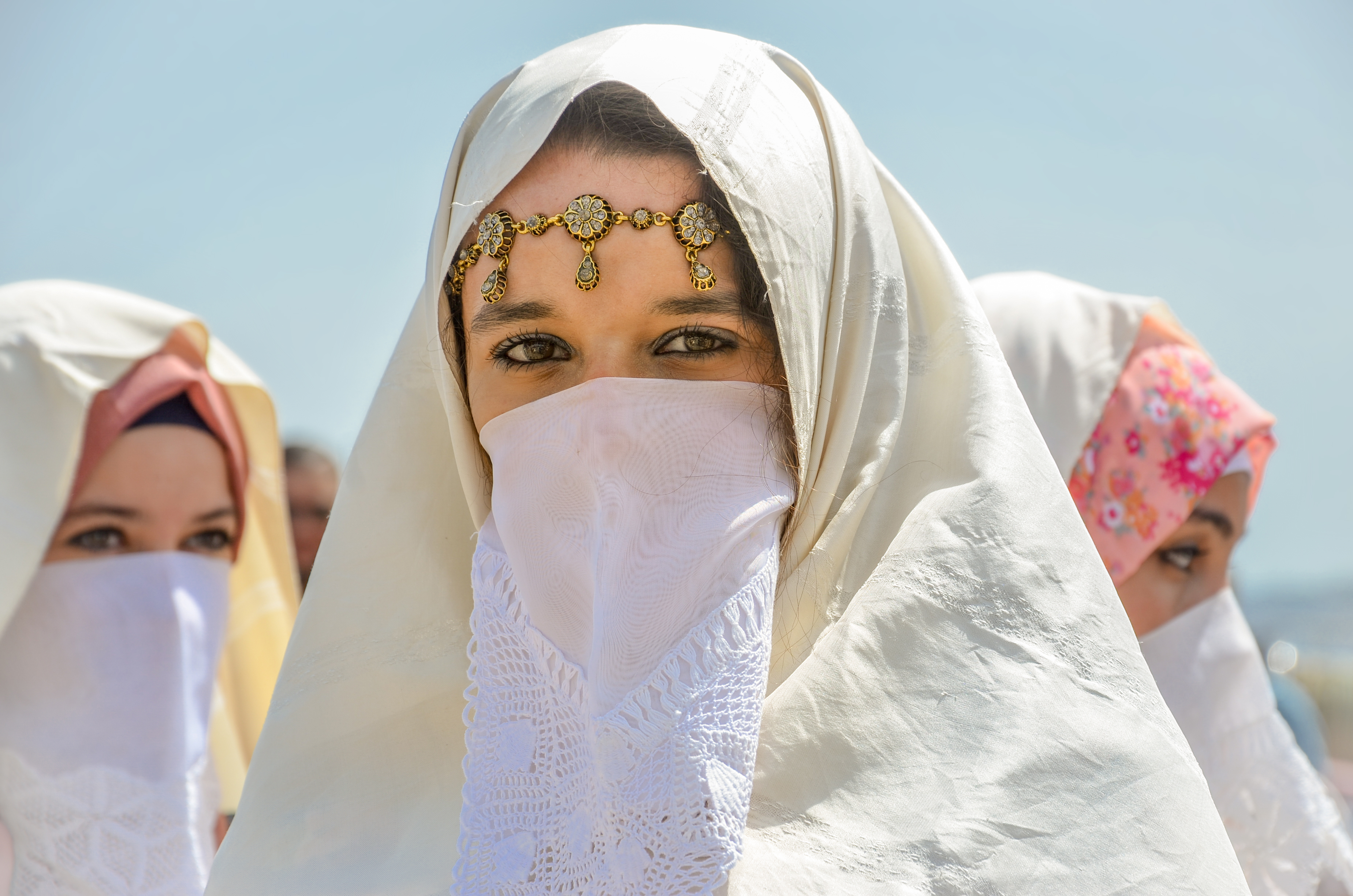
Women in the predominantly Islamic country of Algeria wearing a haïk, a type of veil.

A variety of headdresses worn by Muslim women and girls in accordance with hijab (the principle of dressing modestly) are sometimes referred to as veils. The principal aim of the Muslim veil is to cover the Awrah (parts of the body that are considered private). Many of these garments cover the hair, ears, and throat, but do not cover the face.

Depending on geography and culture, the veil is referenced and worn in different ways. The khimar is a type of headscarf. The niqāb and burqa are two kinds of veils that cover most of the face except for a slit or hole for the eyes. In Algeria, a larger veil called the haïk includes a triangular panel to cover the lower part of the face. In the Arabian Peninsula and parts of North Africa (specifically Saudi Arabia), the abaya is worn constructed like a loose robe covering everything but the face itself. In another location, such as Iran, the chador is worn as the semicircles of fabric are draped over the head like a shawl and held in place under the neck by hand. The two terms for veiling that are directly mentioned in the Quran is the jilbab and the khimar. In these references, the veiling is meant to promote modesty by covering the genitals and breasts of women.

The Afghan burqa covers the entire body, obscuring the face completely, except for a grille or netting over the eyes to allow the wearer to see. The boshiya is a veil that may be worn over a headscarf; it covers the entire face and is made of a sheer fabric so the wearer is able to see through it. It has been suggested that the practice of wearing a veil – uncommon among the Arab tribes prior to the rise of Islam – originated in the Byzantine Empire, and then spread.

The Bedouin living in Southern Palestine and the Sinai peninsula also use face veils. The traditional veils in Palestine are short and decorated with coins. In northern Sinai, the veil sections are longer, and often contain embroidery, chains, pendants, beads, … The Bedouin-style mask is known as al-maghrun, al-baghrah, or al-niqab.

In the UAE, Qatar and Oman, a face mask known as the burghu is used, and in Bahrain, Qatar and Oman, the batulah is used.

In Central Asian sedentary Muslim areas (today Uzbekistan and Tajikistan) women wore veils which when worn the entire face was shrouded, called Paranja or faranji. The traditional veil in Central Asia worn before modern times was the faranji but it was banned by the Soviet Communists.

In Pakistan, upper and middle-class women in towns wear burqas over their normal clothes in public. The burqa is the most visible dress in Pakistan. It is typically a tent-like garment worn over the ordinary clothes and is made of white cotton. Many upper-class women wear a two-piece burqa which is usually black in colour but sometimes navy blue or dark red. It consists of a long cloak and a separate headpiece with a drop-down face veil. Some educated urban women no longer wear the burqa. The burqa is also not worn by rural peasant women who work in the fields. In rural areas only elite women wear burqas.

==== Restrictions ====
The wearing of head and especially face coverings by Muslim women has raised political issues in the West; including in Quebec, and across Europe. Countries and territories that have banned or partially banned the veil include, among others:

- France, where full-face veils (burqa and niqab) have been banned in public places since April 2011, with a 150-euro fine for breaching the ban. All religious veils have been banned in public schools.
- Belgium, also banned full face veils in public places, in July 2011.
- Spain has several towns and cities which have banned the full face veil, including Barcelona.
- Russia's Stavropol region has announced a ban on hijabs in government schools, which was challenged but upheld by the Russian Supreme Court.

Places where headscarves continue to be a contentious political issue include:

- United Kingdom, where the Home Office Minister Jeremy Browne called for a national debate about headscarves and their role in public environments in Britain.
- Quebec, where there is much discussion as to whether the province should allow people wearing a veil over their face to vote without removing it.
- Europe, with a large Muslim population, the European Court of Human Rights has allowed countries to ban full-face veils, as it does not breach the European Convention on Human Rights.

=== Indian religions ===
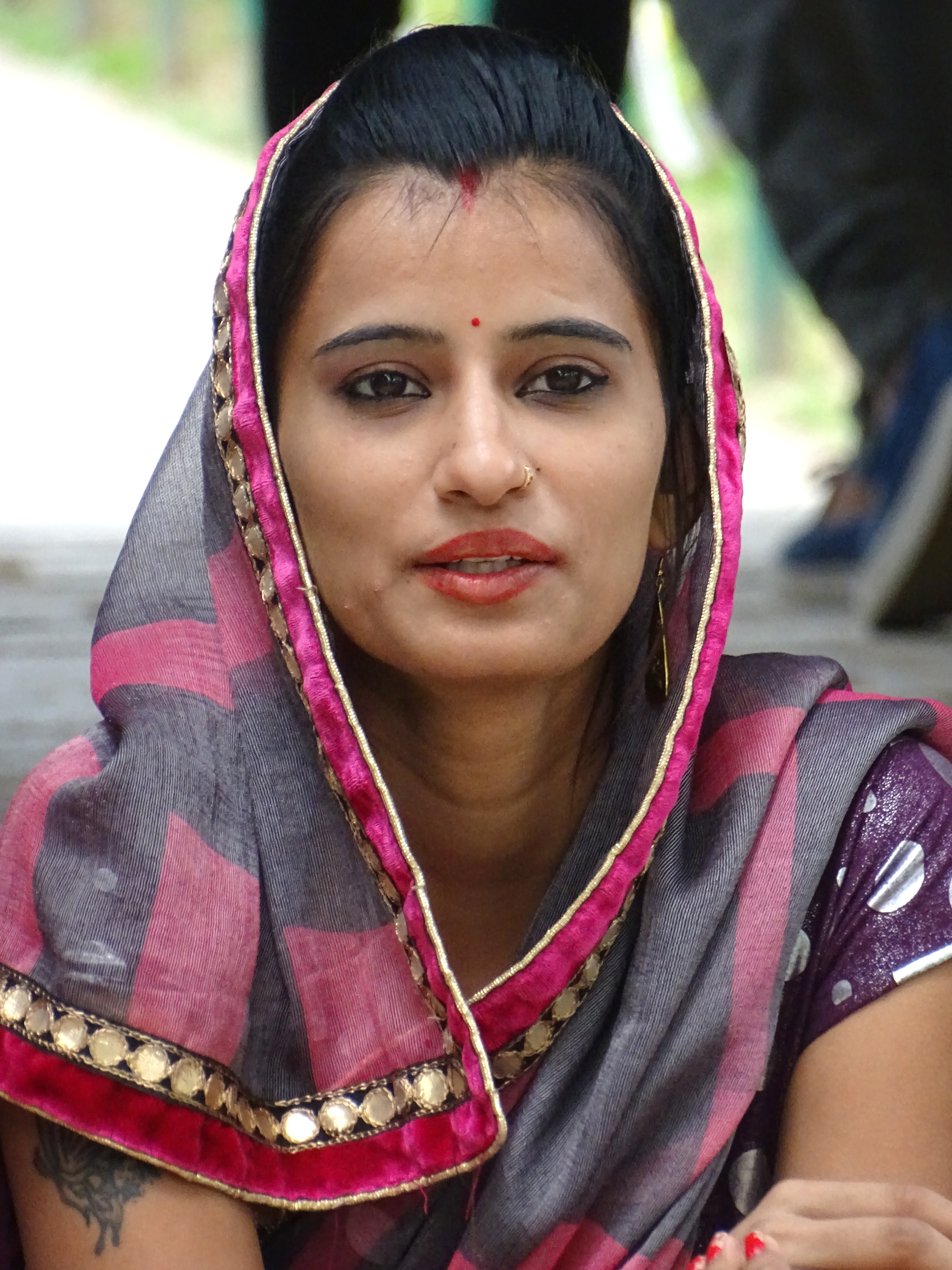
In the northern Indian subcontinent (India, Pakistan, Bangladesh, Afghanistan, Bangladesh, Nepal and Bhutan), it is customary for women of many religions (Hindu, Jain, Sikh, Muslim and Christian) to enter houses of worship and to go out in public wearing a headcovering called a dupatta.

In Indian subcontinent, from 1st century B.C. societies advocated the use of the veil for married Hindu women which came to be known as Ghoonghat. Buddhists attempted to counter this growing practice around 3rd century CE. Rational opposition against veiling and seclusion from spirited ladies resulted in system not becoming popular for several centuries. Under the Medieval Islamic Mughal Empire, various aspects of veiling and seclusion of women was adopted, such as the concept of Purdah and Zenana, partly as an additional protection for women. Purdah became common in the 15th and 16th century, as both Vidyāpati and Chaitanya mention it.

Sikhism was highly critical of all forms of strict veiling, Guru Amar Das condemned it and rejected seclusion and veiling of women, which saw decline of veiling among some classes during late medieval period. This was stressed by Kabir.

Stay, stay, O daughter-in-law - do not cover your face with a veil. In the end, this shall not bring you even half a shell. The one before you used to veil her face; do not follow in her footsteps. The only merit in veiling your face is that for a few days, people will say, "What a noble bride has come". Your veil shall be true only if you skip, dance and sing the Glorious Praises of the Lord. Says Kabeer, the soul-bride shall win, only if she passes her life singing the Lord's Praises.

— Kabir, Guru Granth Sahib 484

== Bridal veils ==
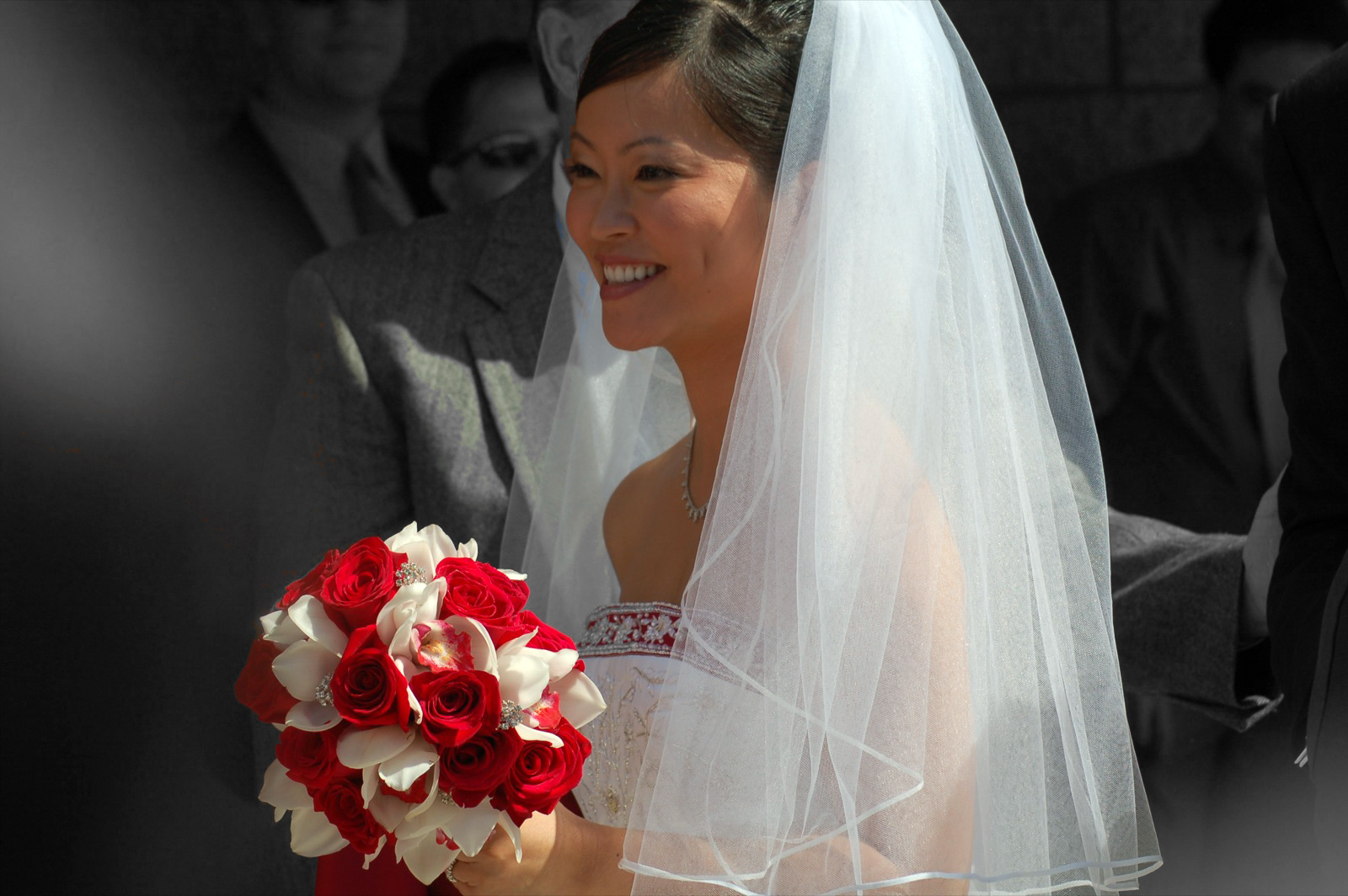
A bridal veil as part of her wedding dress

The veil is one of the oldest parts of a bridal ensemble, dating as far back as Greek and Roman times, to hide a bride "from evil spirits who might want to thwart her happiness" or to frighten the spirits away. The veil also served to hide the bride's face from the groom prior to the wedding, as superstition says that it is bad luck for the groom to see the bride before the ceremony.

In the context of weddings in Western Christian culture, the veil has been used to symbolize modesty before God, obedience, and when the veil is white, chastity; the practice of the wedding veil is part of the larger practice of the woman's headcovering in Christianity, rooted in 1 Corinthians 11:1–13. By the 17th and 18th century, bridal veils were occasionally worn, but were generally out of fashion in Britain and North America, with brides choosing from many other options instead. However, the bridal veil returned to popularity after Queen Victoria wore a veil in her wedding to Prince Albert in 1840. The bridal veil became a status symbol during the Victorian era, and the weight, length, and quality of the veil indicated the bride's social status. Bridal veils worn over the face were not common until the second half of the 19th century.

The tradition of a veiled bride's face continues today wherein, a virgin bride, especially in Christian or Jewish culture, enters the marriage ritual with a veiled face and head, and remains fully veiled, both head and face, until the ceremony concludes. After the full conclusion of the wedding ceremony, either the bride's father lifts the veil, presenting the bride to the groom who then kisses her, or the new groom lifts her face veil in order to kiss her. Some see the lifting of the veil as symbolically consummating the marriage, representing another thin membrane (the hymen) that will be physically penetrated on the wedding night. In Orthodox Judaism, as well as among Christians in certain parts of the world such as Eastern Europe, women will then wear a headcovering in public after being married (as well as while worshipping). In Scandinavia, the bridal veil is usually worn under a traditional crown and does not cover the bride's face; instead, the veil is attached to and hangs from the back.

A bridal veil is not normally worn during a civil marriage ceremony, nor when the bride is remarrying. In these cases, when it is worn, the veil is worn as a fashion accessory as part of the bridal attire, instead of for its symbolism.

=== Judaism ===
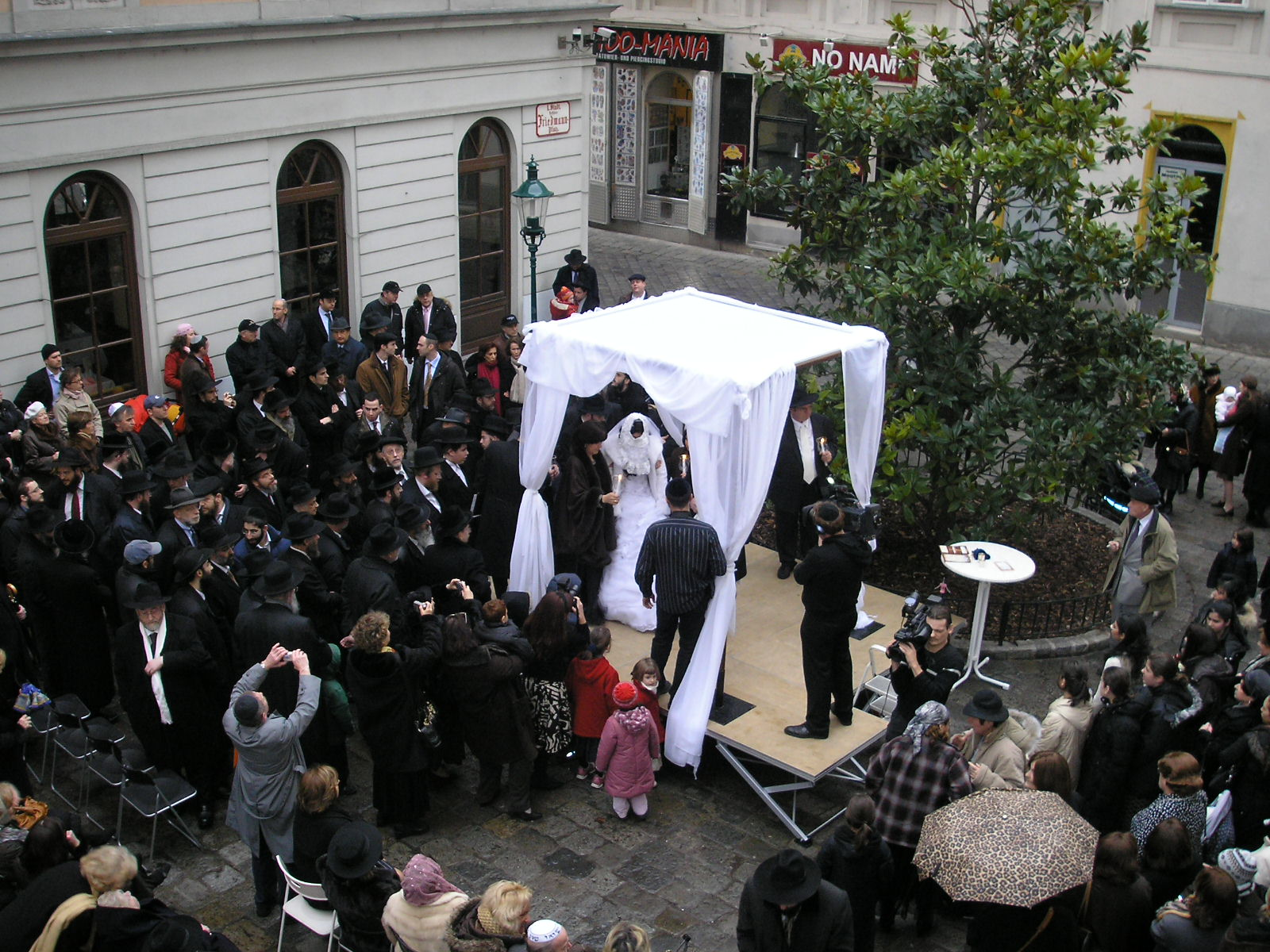
An Orthodox Jewish wedding in Vienna, where the bride is wearing a traditional veil

In Judaism, the tradition of the bride wearing a veil during the wedding ceremony dates back to biblical times. According to the Torah in Genesis 24:65, Isaac is brought Rebekah to marry by his father Abraham's servant, and Rebekah took her veil and covered herself when Isaac was approaching.

In a traditional Jewish wedding, just before the ceremony, the badeken takes place, at which the groom places the veil over the bride's face, and either he or the officiating rabbi gives her a blessing. The veil stays on her face until just before the end of the wedding ceremony – when they are legally married according to Jewish law – then the groom helps lift the veil off her face. The most often cited interpretation for the badeken is that, according to Genesis 29, when Jacob went to marry Rachel, his father-in-law Laban tricked him into marrying Leah, Rachel's older and homelier sister.

Many say that the veiling ceremony takes place to make sure that the groom is marrying the right bride. Some say that as the groom places the veil over his bride, he makes an implicit promise to clothe and protect her. Finally, by covering her face, the groom recognizes that he is marrying the bride for her inner beauty; while looks will fade with time, his love will be everlasting. In some ultra-orthodox communities, it is a custom for the bride to wear an opaque veil as she is escorted to the groom. This is said to show her complete willingness to enter into the marriage and her absolute trust that she is marrying the right man.

In ancient Judaism, the lifting of the veil took place just prior to the consummation of the marriage in sexual union. The uncovering or unveiling that takes place in the wedding ceremony is a symbol of what will take place in the marriage bed. Just as the two become one through their words spoken in wedding vows, so these words are a sign of the physical oneness that they will consummate later on. The lifting of the veil is a symbol and anticipation of this.

=== Christianity ===
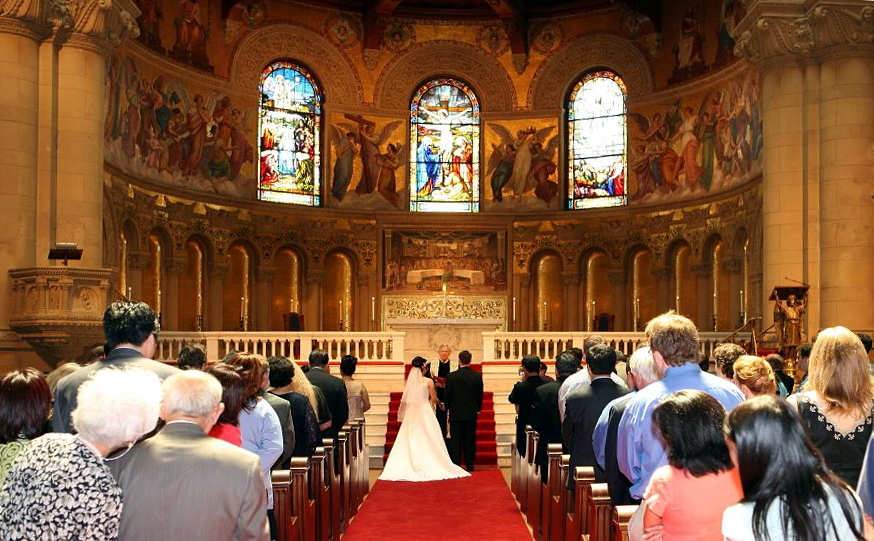
Bride wearing the bridal veil at her wedding

In Christian theology, St. Paul's words concerning how marriage symbolizes the union of Christ and His Church underlie part of the tradition of veiling in the marriage ceremony. In historic Christian traditions, the veil is seen as "a visible sign that the woman is under the authority of a man" and that she is submitting herself to her husband's Christ-like leadership and loving care. As such, the practice of the wedding veil is part of the wider ordinance of the woman's headcovering in Christianity, rooted in 1 Corinthians 11:1–13.

The removing of the veil can be seen as a symbol of the temple veil that was torn when Christ died, giving believers direct access to God, and in the same way, the bride and the groom, once married, now have full access to one another.

==== Church of Jesus Christ of Latter-day Saints ====
In 2019 a letter by the Church of Jesus Christ of Latter-day Saints President Russell M. Nelson and his counselors, Dallin H. Oaks and Henry B. Eyring, declared that "Veiling the faces of deceased, 'endowed' [members who have been through a temple ceremony] women prior to burial is optional"; previously it had been required. The letter went on to say that such veiling, "may be done if the sister expressed such a desire while she was living. In cases where the wishes of the deceased sister on this matter are not known, her family should be consulted." That same year veiling of women during part of the temple endowment ceremony was also made optional where it had been required before.

== Mourning veils ==
Veils remained a part of Western mourning dress customs into the early 20th century. The tradition of widow's veiling has its roots in the attire of a Christian nun, which symbolized modesty and chastity, and the mourning veil became a way to demonstrate sincerity and piety. The mourning veil was commonly seen as a means of shielding the mourner and hiding her grief, and, on the contrary, seen by some women as a means of publicly expressing their emotions. Widows in the Victorian era were expected to wear mourning veils for at least three months and up to two and a half years, depending on the custom.

Mourning veils have also been sometimes perceived as expressions of elegance or even sex appeal. In a 19th-century American etiquette book one finds: "Black is becoming, and young widows, fair, plump, and smiling, with their roguish eyes sparkling under their black veils are very seducing".

== Interpretations ==
One view is that as a religious item, it is intended to honor a person, object or space. The actual sociocultural, psychological, and sociosexual functions of veils have not been studied extensively but most likely include the maintenance of social distance and the communication of social status and cultural identity.

A veil also has symbolic interpretations, as something partially concealing, disguising, or obscuring.

== Tradition of veil use in China ==
China has a long tradition of wearing veils. Veils were used to cover the face and had been used since the Han dynasty, where they were called "facial clothes" or "facial hats"; they were used to protect its wearer's face from the wind and sand when they would ride horses or when they would travel on long trips. In the Tang dynasty, mili and weimao were used to cover the face when horse riding. In the Song dynasty, women would wear a veiled hat or veil when they left their houses, honggaitou on their wedding, a veil called 'white jade silk' during their mourning period.

== See also ==
- Nuptial veil
- Purdah
