= Wedding mandapa =

Hindu wedding pavilion

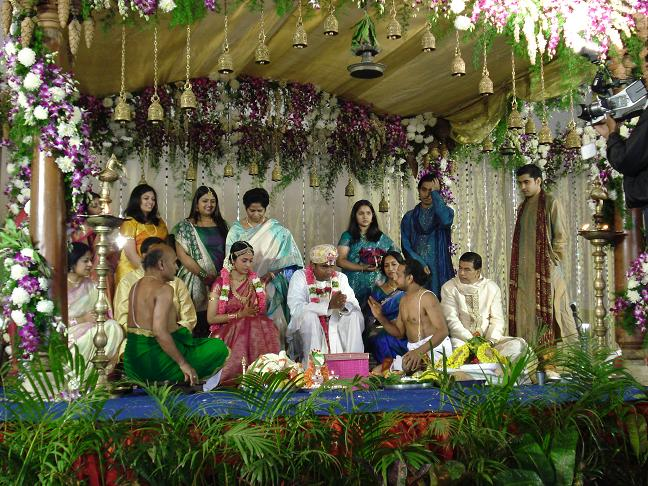
Bride and groom within a wedding mandapa.

A Vivaha Mandapa (Sanskrit: विवाह मण्डप, romanized: Vivāha Maṇḍapa, lit. 'Wedding pavilion'), also referred to as Kalyana Mandapa (Sanskrit: कल्याण मण्डप, romanized: Kalyāṇa Maṇḍapa) or simply Wedding mandapa is a mandapa (pavilion) temporarily erected for the purpose of a Hindu or Jain wedding. It is the term used for the wedding canopy in Dharmic religions. The main wedding ceremonies take place under this mandapa. Vivaha Mandapas have historically also been featured adjacent to Hindu temples to commemorate the wedding of Hindu deities, such as Rama and Sita.

== Description ==
A Vivaha Mandapa is traditionally made of wood, although in the contemporary period, modern materials are sometimes used. It is often set up as an arrangement that includes pillars supporting a frame, royal chairs for the bride and the groom, side chairs for parents, and a pedestal for the sacred fire.

It is often rented from businesses that specialise in renting items for an Indian wedding. Its use is common among overseas Indians as well.

The use of a mandapa is an ancient custom, and is described in texts like Ramacharitamanas and various Sanskrit texts. The bride is often escorted to the mandapa by her maternal uncle.

== Decorations ==
Traditionally, the wedding mandapa is decorated using kalashas (pots filled with water), garlands of mango leaves, coconuts, banana leaves, and other traditional objects.

Modern mandapas use fabrics, lights, crystals, flowers, Wrought Iron unique shapes and other materials insuring all religious aspects of a mandapa, which include the four pillars and havana kunda (fire altar) is now completely modernised by design.

== See also ==
- Chuppah
- Poruwa Ceremony
