= Badeken =

Ceremony where the groom veils the bride in a Jewish wedding

Badeken, Bedeken, Badekenish, or Bedekung (Yiddish: באַדעקן badekn, lit. covering), is the ceremony where the groom veils the bride in a Jewish wedding.

Just prior to the actual wedding ceremony, which takes place under the chuppah, the bridegroom, accompanied by his parents, the Rabbi, and other dignitaries, and amidst joyous singing of his friends, covers the bride's face with a veil. At this point, it is traditional for the Rabbi to pronounce a blessing upon the couple. The bride wears this veil until the conclusion of the chuppah ceremony.

== Sources ==
The custom of a virgin bride wearing a veil is mentioned in the Talmud.

The veiling itself is a symbol of modesty, based upon the verse in connection with Rebecca meeting Isaac, "[T]hen she took her veil and covered herself." The practice of the groom uncovering the veil comes from when Jacob married Leah by accident, because her face was veiled, when he really wanted to marry Rachel.

Some maintain that the Badeken ceremony is the meaning of the term chuppah (Hebrew for "covering") mentioned in the Talmud and thus has legal ramifications.
