= Poruwa ceremony =

Traditional Sinhalese wedding ceremony

A Poruwa ceremony is a traditional Sinhalese wedding ceremony. The ceremony takes place on a "Poruwa", a beautifully decorated, traditional wooden platform. The ceremony involves a series of rituals performed by the bride and groom, and their families.

== Order of events ==
The groom and his relatives assemble on the right of the Poruwa and the bride's family gathers on the left. The bride and groom enter the Poruwa leading with the right foot first. They greet each other with palms held together in the traditional manner. The ceremony officiant then presents betel leaves to the couple which they accept. Afterwards, they hand them back to him to be placed on the Poruwa.

The bride's father places the right hand of the bride on that of the groom as a symbolic gesture of handing over the bride to the groom. The groom's brother hands over a tray with seven sheaves of betel leaves with a coin placed in each. The groom holds the tray while the bride takes one leaf at a time and drops it on the Poruwa. The groom then repeats this process. The groom's brother hands a gold necklace to the groom who in turn places it on the bride's neck. The maternal uncle enters the Poruwa and ties the small fingers of the bride and groom with a single gold thread (to symbolize unity) and then pours water over the fingers. Six girls will then bless the marriage with a traditional Buddhist chant (Jayamangala Gatha). The groom presents to his bride a white cloth which in turn is presented to the bride's mother. This is an expression of the groom's gratitude to his mother-in-law.

The bride's mother will then present a plate of milk rice specially cooked for the occasion to the bride who feeds a portion to the groom. The groom then feeds the bride. As the newly married couple steps down from the Poruwa, one of the groom's family members breaks a fresh coconut.

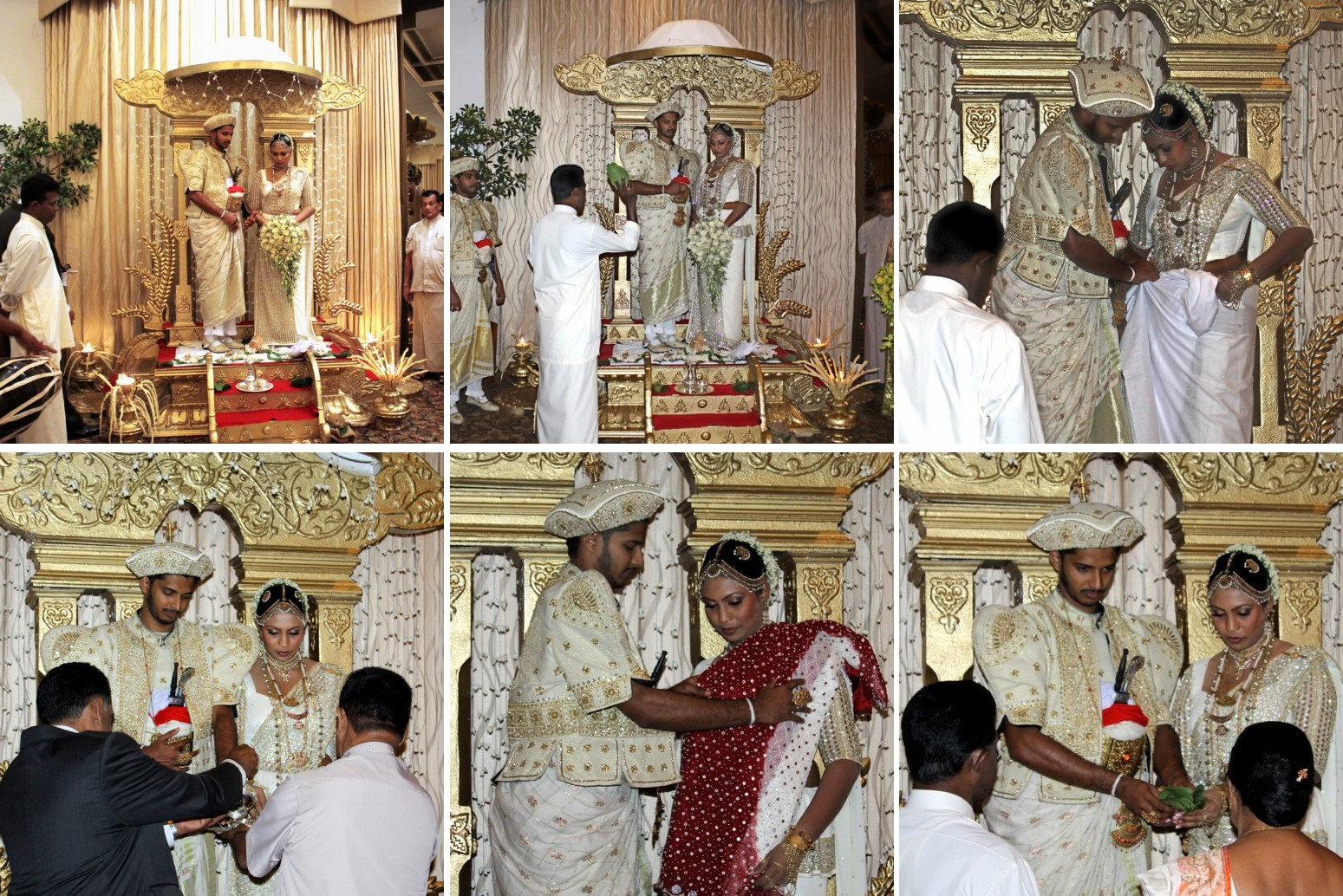
Different stages of Poruwa Ceremony.

== History ==
The Poruwa ceremony appears to have existed in Sri Lanka before the introduction of Buddhism in the 3rd century BC. The Poruwa ceremony was a valid custom as a registered marriage until the British introduced the registration of marriages by Law in 1870. Today's Poruwa ceremony has been influenced by both upcountry and low country customs of Sri Lanka.

== See also ==
- Buddhism in Sri Lanka
