= History of Western fashion =

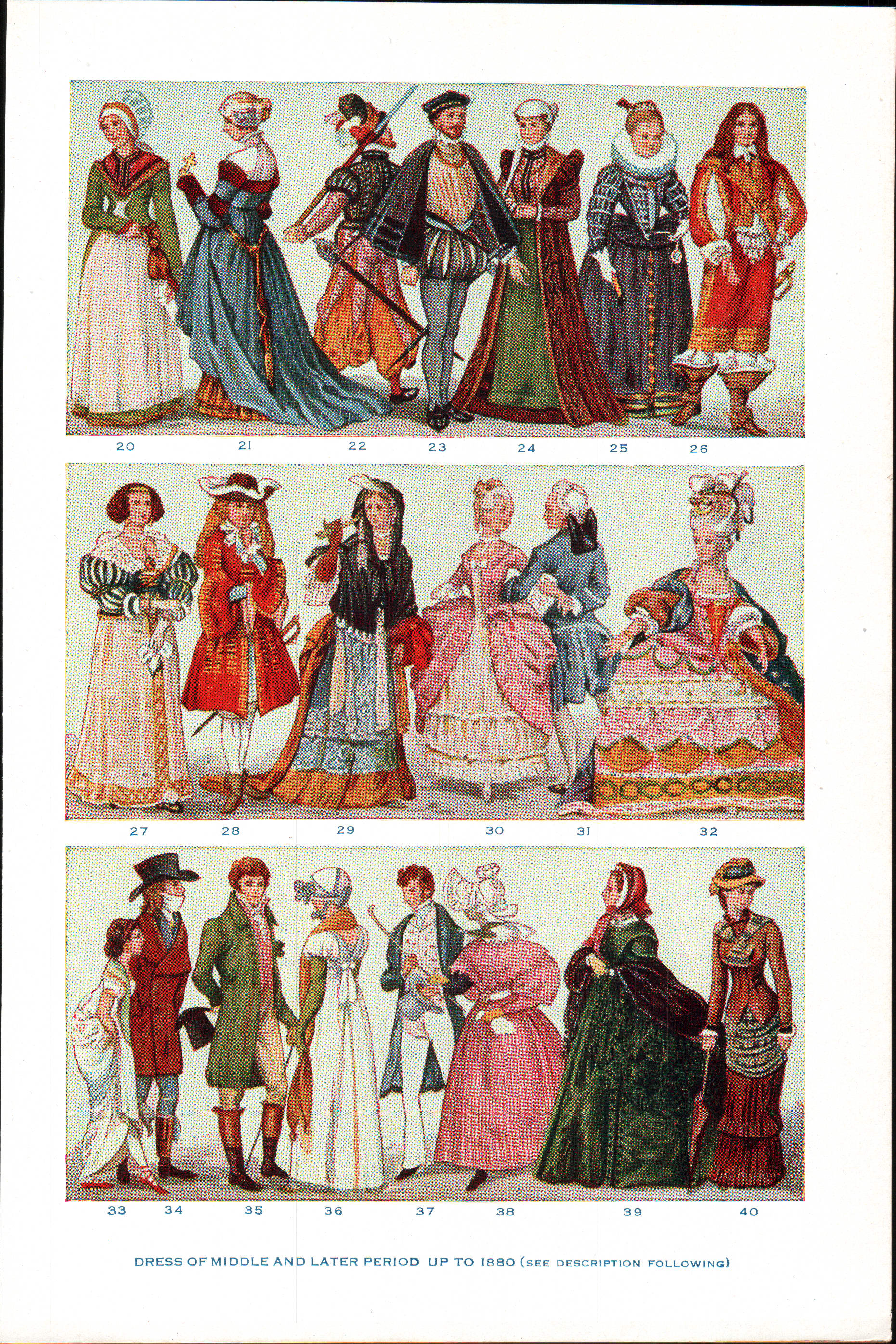
Overview of fashion from The New Student's Reference Work, 1914.

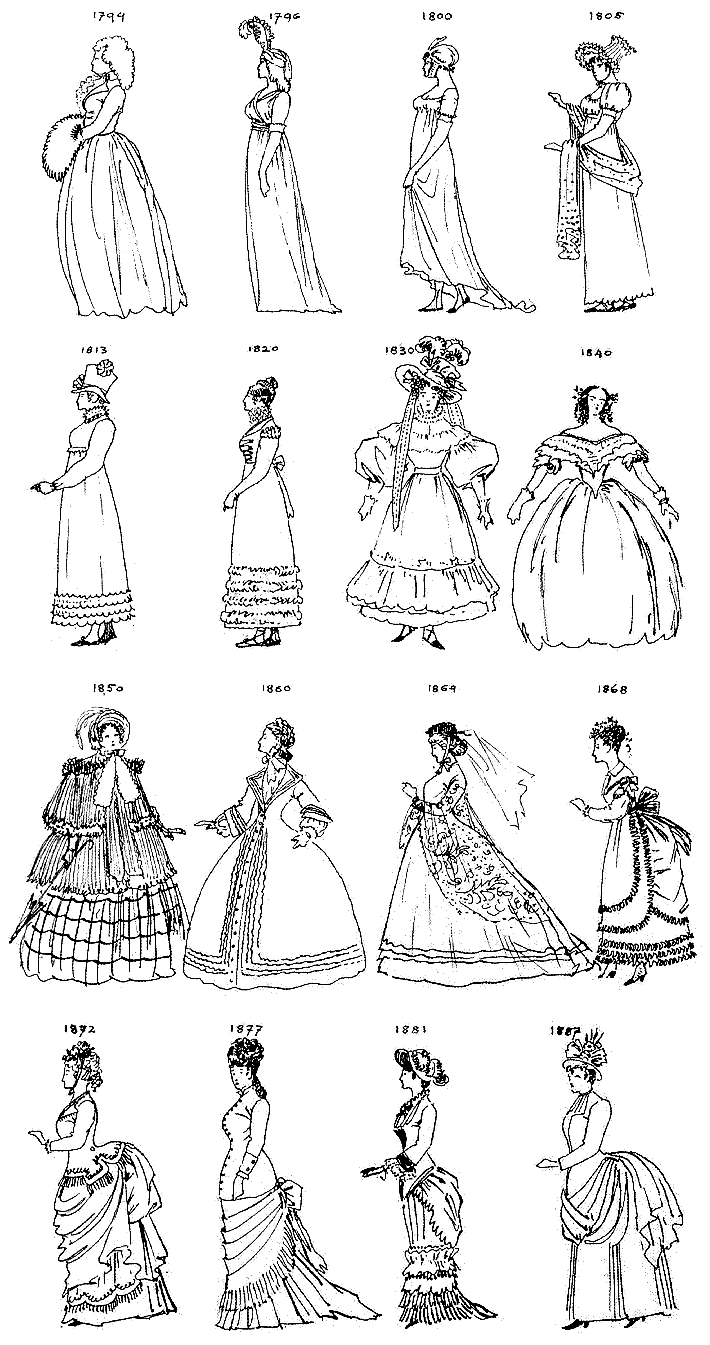
Summary of women's fashion silhouet changes, 1794–1887

The following is a chronological list of articles covering the history of Western fashion—the story of the changing fashions in clothing in countries under influence of the Western world—from the 5th century to the present. The series focuses primarily on the history of fashion in Western European countries and countries in the core Anglosphere.

== History of fashion by time ==
- 400–1100 in fashion
- 1100–1200 in fashion
- 1200–1300 in fashion
- 1300–1400 in fashion
- 1400–1500 in fashion
- 1500–1550 in fashion
- 1550–1600 in fashion
- 1600–1650 in fashion
- 1650–1700 in fashion
- 1700–1750 in fashion
- 1750–1775 in fashion
- 1775–1795 in fashion
- 1795–1820 in fashion
- 1820s in fashion
- 1830s in fashion
- 1840s in fashion
- 1850s in fashion
- 1860s in fashion
- 1870s in fashion
- 1880s in fashion
- 1890s in fashion
- 1900s in fashion
- 1910s in fashion
- 1920s in fashion
- 1930s in fashion
- 1940s in fashion
- 1950s in fashion
- 1960s in fashion
- 1970s in fashion
- 1980s in fashion
- 1990s in fashion
- 2000s in fashion
- 2010s in fashion
- 2020s in fashion

== See also ==
=== Medieval dress ===
- Byzantine dress
- Early medieval European dress
- English medieval clothing
- Anglo-Saxon dress

=== Related topics ===
- Button
- History of clothing
- History of fashion design
- Fashion
- Clothing
- Clothing terminology
- Costume
- Haute couture
- Hemline
- List of individual dresses
- Needlework
- Neckline
- Sewing
- Tailor
- Suit
- Trim (sewing)
- Victorian fashion
- Waistline (clothing)
- Western dress codes
