= 1100–1200 in European fashion =

Hugh, Abbot of Cluny, Emperor Henry IV, and Countess Matilda of Tuscany, 1115. The Emperor and the countess wear robes and mantles trimmed with bands of gold embroidery. The countess wears a linen veil draped over her hair.

Twelfth century European fashion was simple in cut and differed only in details from the clothing of the preceding centuries, starting to become tighter and more similar for men and women as the century went on, which would continue in the 13th century. Men wore knee-length tunics for most activities, and men of the upper classes wore long tunics, with hose and mantle or cloaks. Women wore long tunics or gowns. A close fit to the body, full skirts, and long flaring sleeves were characteristic of upper-class fashion for both men and women.

== General trends ==
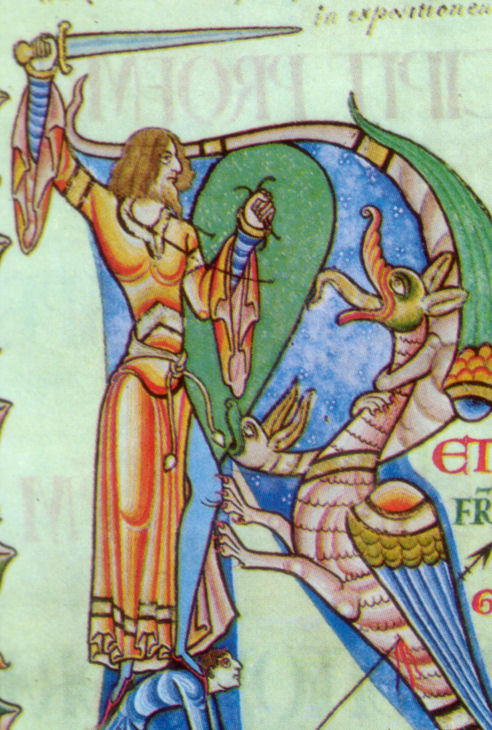
Warrior wears a bliaut or form-fitting outer tunic with full skirts and wide sleeves over long blue hose. The garment worn underneath the bliaut has striped sleeves. His belt wraps around the waist and is knotted in front.

=== Overview ===
As in the previous centuries, two styles of dress existed side-by-side for men: a short (knee-length) costume deriving from a melding of the everyday dress of the later Roman Empire and the short tunics worn by the invading barbarians, and a long (ankle-length) costume descended from the clothing of the Roman upper classes and influenced by Byzantine dress.

=== Fabrics and furs ===
Wool remained the primary fabric for clothing of all classes, while linen undergarments, which were more comfortable against the skin and could be washed and then bleached in the sun, were increasingly worn. Silk, although extremely expensive, was readily available to wealthy people of consequence. Silks from Byzantium were traded in Pavia by way of Venice, and silks from Andalusia reached France via Spain. In the last decade of the previous century, the Norman conquest of Sicily and the First Crusade had opened additional routes for Eastern fabrics and style influences into Europe.

Fur was worn as an inside lining for warmth. Vair, the fur of the squirrel, was particularly popular and can be seen in many illuminated manuscript illustrations, where it is shown as a white and blue-grey softly striped or checkered pattern lining the mantles of the wealthy.

=== The bliaut ===
A new French fashion for both men and women was the bliaut or bliaud, a long outer tunic with full skirts from the hip and sleeves that fitted tightly to the elbow and then flared into a trumpet shape. Early bliauts were moderately fitted and bloused slightly over the belt at the waist. Later the bliaut was fitted tightly to the body from shoulder to hip, and the belt, or girdle was wrapped twice around the waist and knotted in front of the abdomen.

== Men's clothing ==
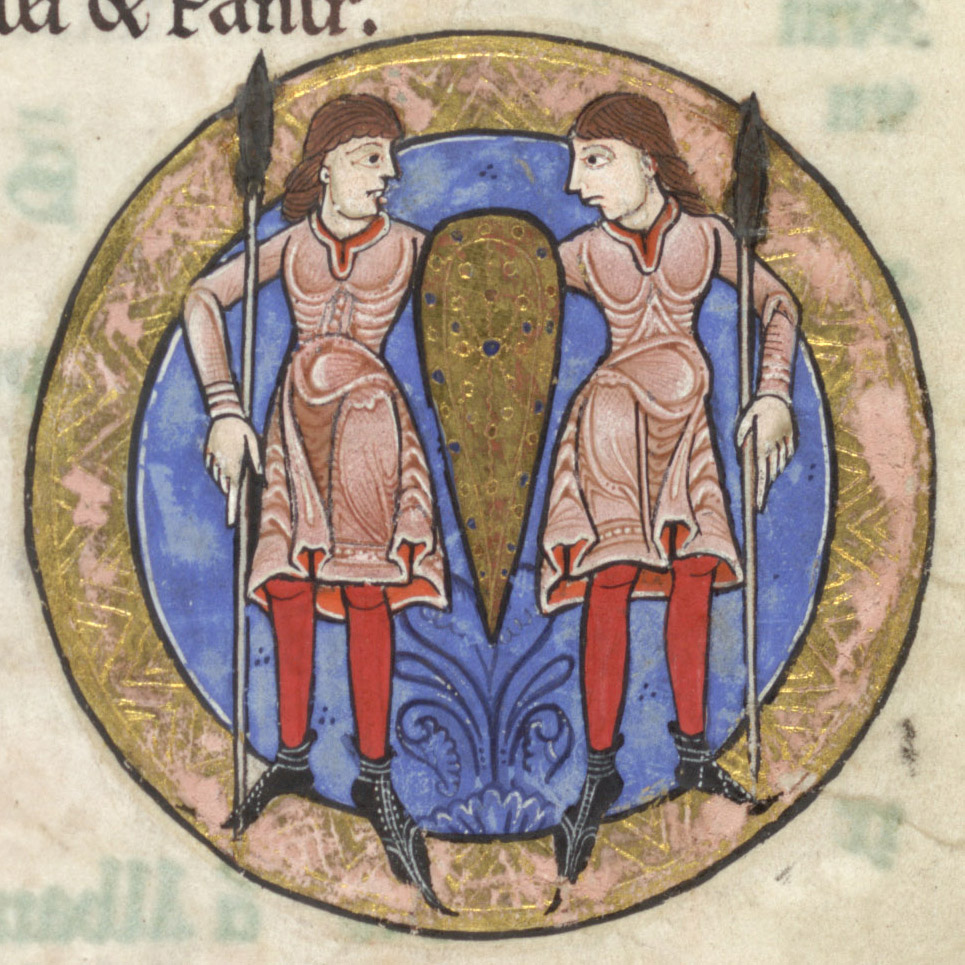
"Gemini" from the Hunterian Psalter shows the twins in knee-length tunics over chausses and shoes with pointed toes. England, c. 1170

=== Shirt, braies, and chausses ===
Underclothes consisted of an inner tunic (French chainse) or shirt with long, tight sleeves, and drawers or braies, usually of linen. Tailored cloth leggings called chausses or hose, made as separate garments for each leg, were often worn with the tunic; striped hose were popular.

During this period, beginning with the middle and upper classes, hose became longer and more fitting, and they reached above the knees. Previously, they were looser and worn with drawers that ranged from knee- to ankle-length. The new type of hose were worn with drawers that reached the knees or above, and they were wide enough at the top to allow the drawers to be tucked into them. They were held up in place by being attached to the girdle of the drawers.

The better fit and girdle attachment of these new hose eliminated the need for the leg bands often worn with earlier hose. In England, however, leg bands continued to be worn by some people, both rich and poor, right up to the reign of Richard I. After 1200, they were largely abandoned.

=== Outer tunics and doublets ===
Over the undertunic and hose, men wore an outer tunic that reached to the knees or ankles, and that was fastened at the waist with a belt. Fitted bliauts, of wool or, increasingly, silk, had sleeves that were cut wide at the wrist and gored skirts. Men wore bliauts open to the waist front and back or at the side seams.

Newly fashionable were short, fitted garments for the upper body, worn under the tunic: the doublet, made of two layers of linen, and an early form of quilted and padded jupe or gipon.

The sleeveless surcoat or cyclas was introduced during this period as protective covering for armour (especially against the sun) during the Crusades. By the next century, it would become widely adopted as civilian dress.

Rectangular and circular cloaks were worn over the tunic. These fastened on the right shoulder or at the center front.

=== Headgear ===
Men of the upper classes often went hatless. The chaperon in the form of hood and attached shoulder-length cape was worn during this period, especially by the rural lower classes, and the fitted linen coif tied under the chin appeared very late in the century. Small round or slightly conical caps with rolled brims were worn, and straw hats were worn for outdoor work in summer.

=== Style gallery ===
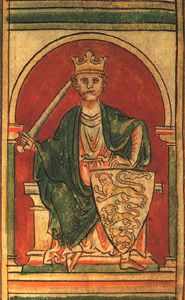
1 – Richard I of England

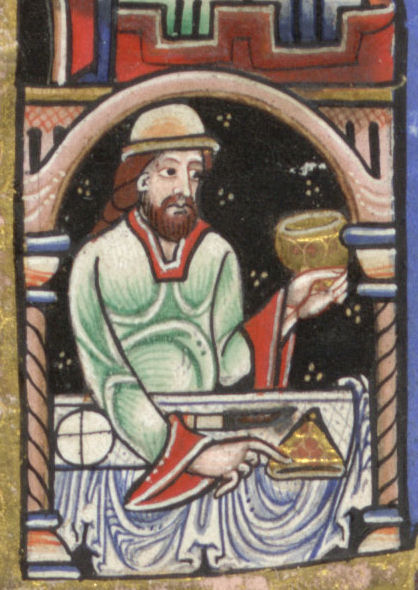
2 – Feasting

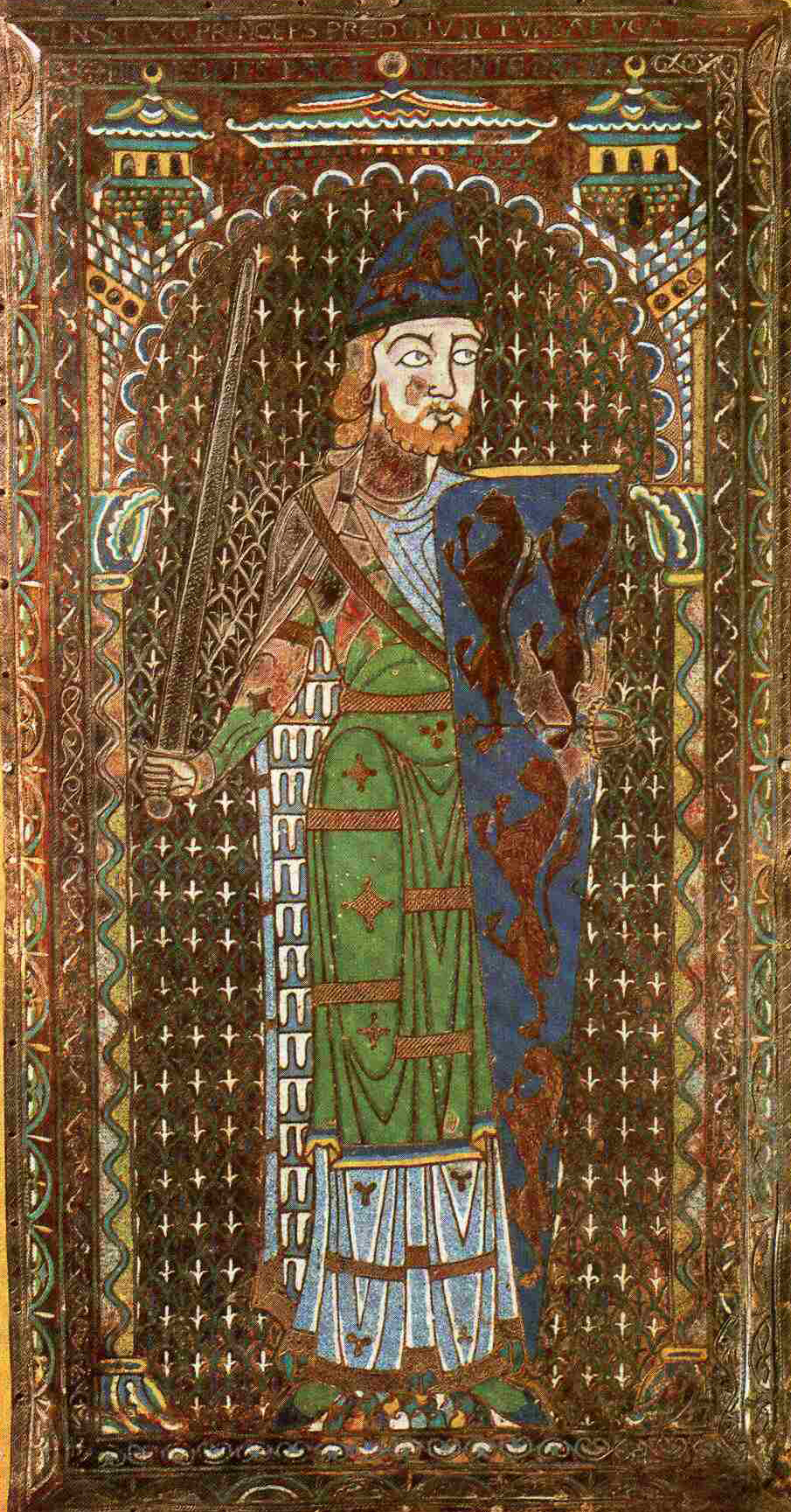
3 – Geoffrey of Anjou
1. Richard the Lionheart is portrayed in a long tunic with tight sleeves and a mantle, late 12th century.
2. Man feasting wears a cap with a rolled brim and a tunic with wide turned-back cuffs, England, c. 1170.
3. Monument of Geoffrey of Anjou (d. 1151) depicts him in a calf-length overtunic and long undertunic, with a blue mantle lined in vair. He wears a cap with his coat of arms.

== Women's clothing ==
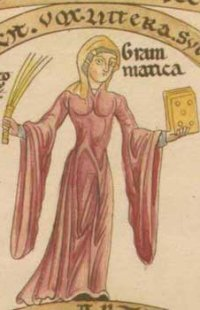
Figure of Grammatica showing the trumpet-sleeved bliaut characteristic of the later 12th century, from the Hortus Deliciarum, c. 1180

=== Chemise and tunic ===
Women's clothing consisted of an undertunic called a chemise, chainse or smock, usually of linen, over which was worn one or more ankle-to-floor length tunics (also called gowns or kirtles).

Working-class women wore their tunics ankle-length and belted at the waist.

Women of the French court wore a loosely fitted tunic called a cotte or the form-fitting bliaut over a full chemise with tight sleeves. The bliaut had a flaring skirt and sleeves tight to the elbow and then widening to wrist in a trumpet shape. A bliaut apparently cut in one piece from neckline to hem depicted on a column figure of a woman at the Cathedral of St. Maurice at Angers has visible side-lacing and is belted at the natural waistline. A new fashion, the bliaut gironé, arose in mid-century: this dress is cut in two pieces, a fitted upper portion with a finely pleated skirt attached to a low waistband.

The fitted bliaut was sometimes worn with a long belt or cincture (in French, ceinture) that looped around a slightly raised waist and was knotted over the abdomen; the cincture could have decorative tassels or metal tags at the ends.

In England, the fashionable dress was wide at the wrist but without the trumpet-shaped flare from the elbow seen in France.

=== Hairstyles and headdresses ===
Married women, in keeping with Christian custom, wore veils over their hair, which was often parted in the center and hung down in long braids that might be extended with false hair or purchased hair from the dead, a habit decried by moralists.

During the Middle Ages hair was charged with cultural meaning. Hair could be used to convey messages of social differentiation.

The wimple was introduced in England late in the century. It consisted of a linen cloth that covered the throat (and often the chin as well), and that was fastened about the head, under the veil.

=== Style gallery ===
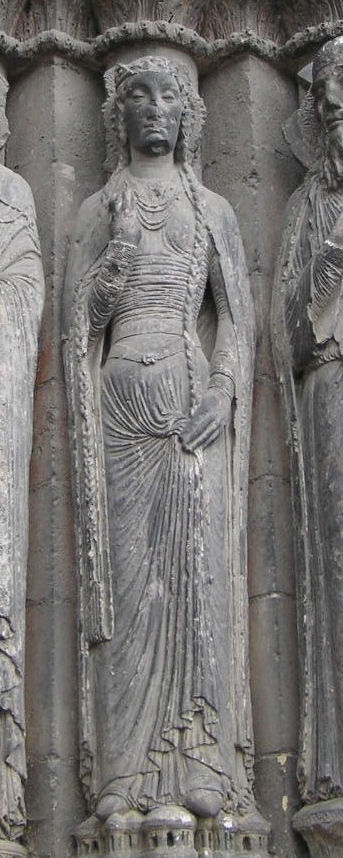
1 – Bliaut

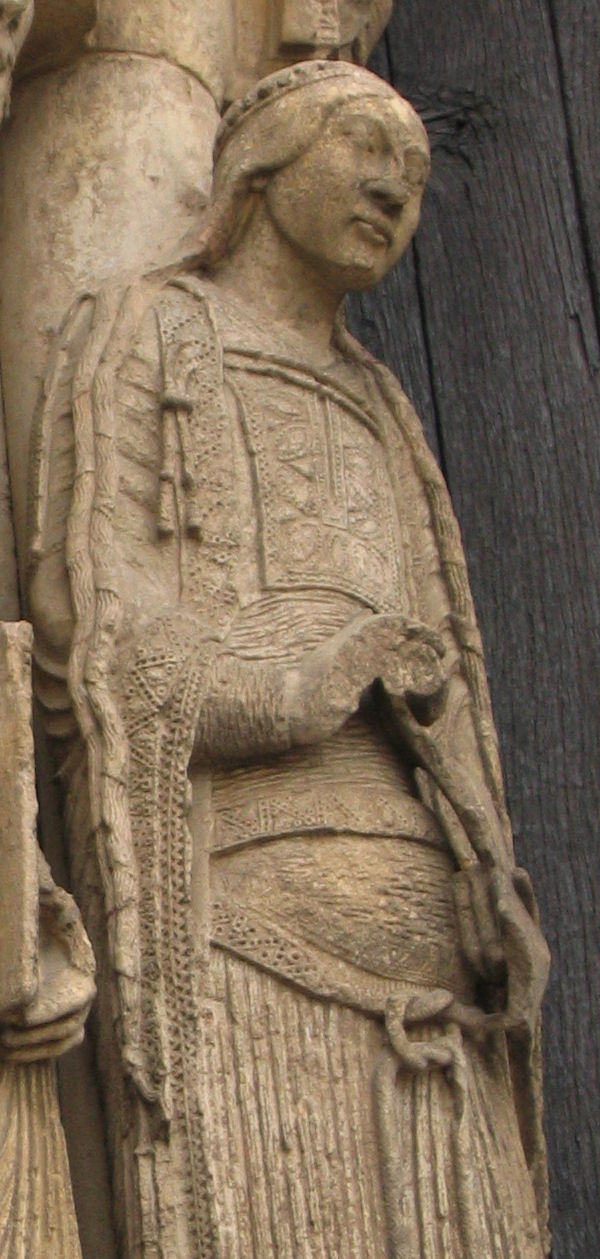
2 – Bliaut gironé

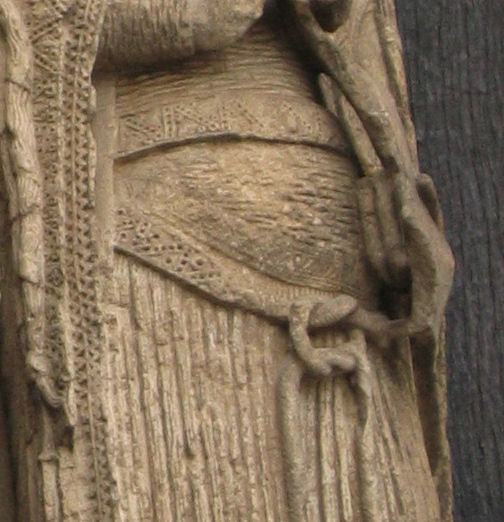
3 – Girdle

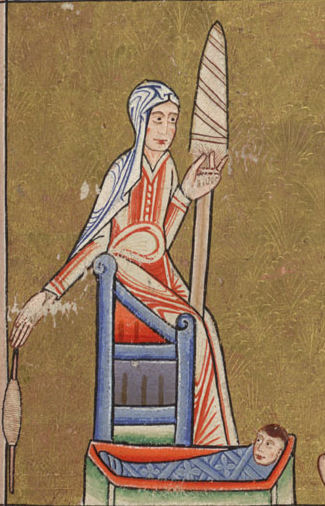
4 – Eve spinning

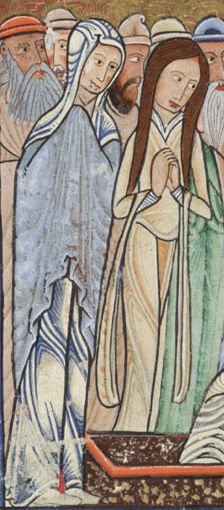
5 – Two women

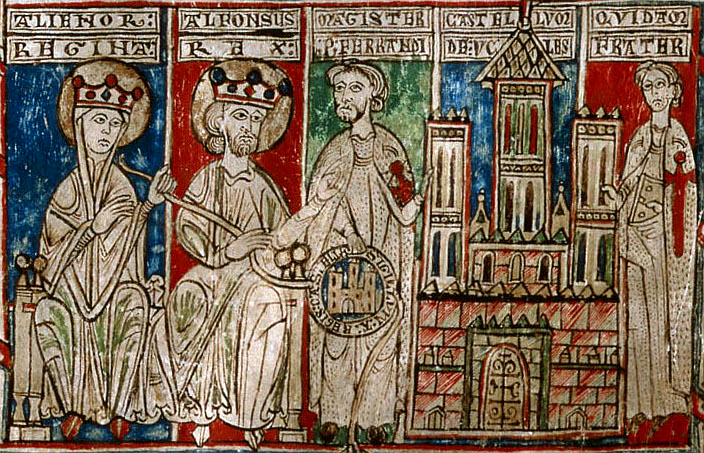
6 – Iberian royalty
1. Woman wears a bliaut cut in one piece from neck to hem and laced at the sides, over a chemise with tight sleeves. Overall she wears a mantle tied with a double cord. Cathédrale Saint-Maurice d'Angers, between 1130 and 1160.
2. Bliaut gironé has a finely pleated skirt attached to a decorative waistband at hip level. The bliaut is worn with a knotted girdle or cincture, Cathédrale Notre-Dame de Chartres, between 1130 and 1160.
3. Detail of the knotted girdle worn with the bliaut gironé at Chartres. The waistband of the skirt can be seen above the knotted girdle.
4. Eve spinning in a long bliaut with straight sleeves and a linen veil, c. 1170.
5. Two women from the Hunterian Psalter. The woman on the left wears a veil and mantle. The young woman on the right wears her hair uncovered, and her bliaut sleeves are wide at the wrist as seen in English fashion c. 1170.
6. Queen Leonor of England, sitting on the far left, wears a veil that covers most of her body.

== Working clothes ==
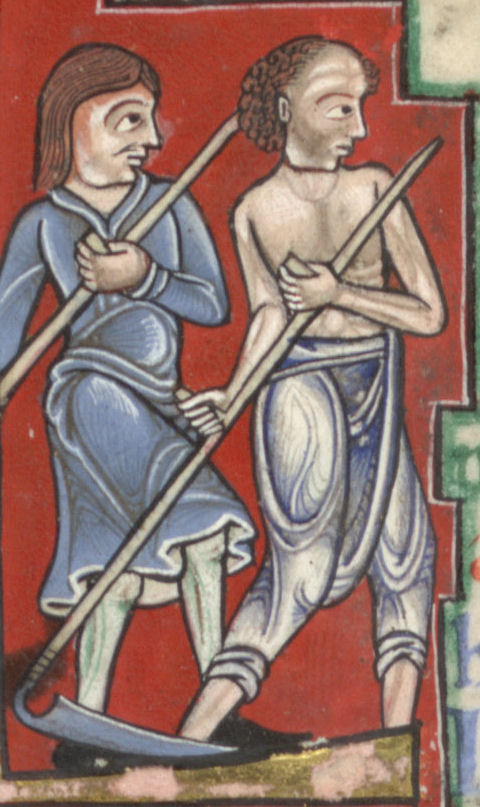
1 – Haymaking

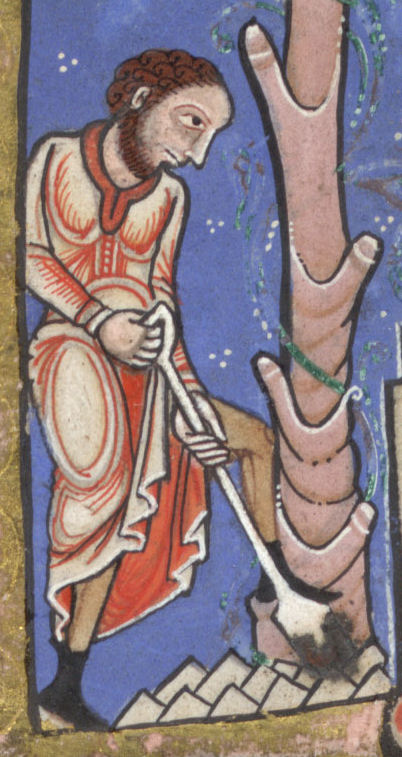
2 – Digging

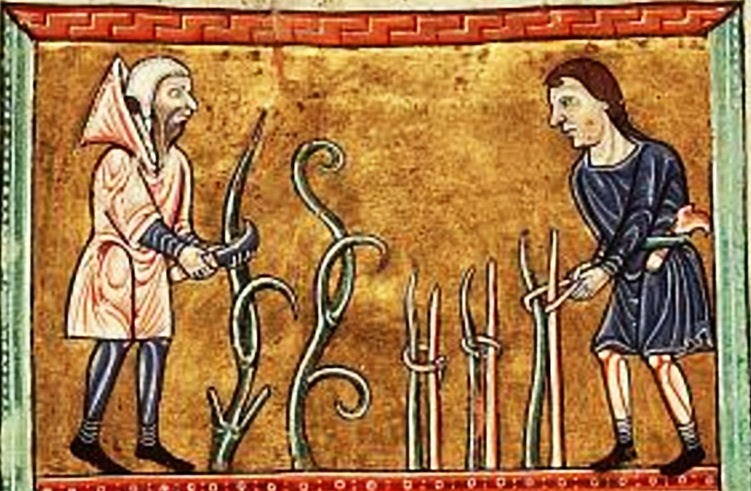
3 – Pruning grapevines

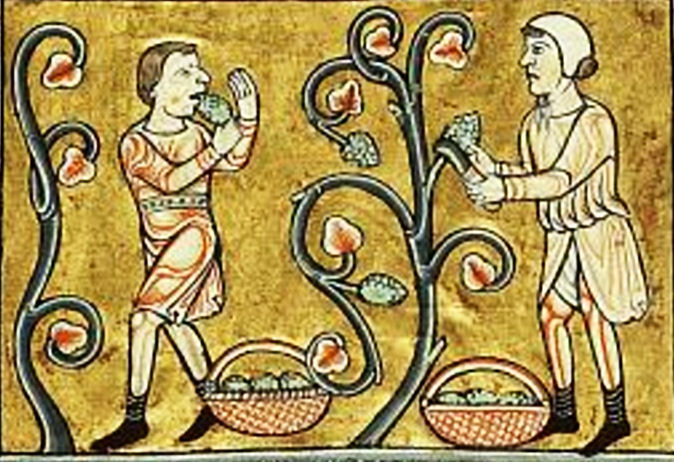
4 – Harvesting grapes
1. Mowing hay. The man on the right works in linen braies, c. 1170
2. Man digging has tucked up his long tunic, which he wears with chausses and ankle-high shoes, c. 1170
3. Men pruning grapevines wear short tunics and chausses. The man on the left wears a hood over a linen coif, Normandy, c. 1180
4. Men harvesting grapes. The man on the right wears braies and a coif, Normandy, c. 1180

== See also ==
- Early medieval European dress
- 1300–1400 in European fashion
- 1400–1500 in European fashion
