= English medieval clothing =

Costume of the period 500–1500 in England

The Medieval period in England is usually classified as the time between the fall of the Roman Empire to the beginning of the Renaissance, roughly the years AD 410–1485. For various peoples living in England, the Anglo-Saxons, Anglo-Danes, Normans and Britons, clothing in the medieval era differed widely for men and women as well as for different classes in the social hierarchy. The general styles of Early medieval European dress were shared in England. In the later part of the period, men's clothing changed much more rapidly than women's styles. Clothes were very expensive, and both men and women were divided into social classes by regulating the colors and styles that various ranks were permitted to wear. In the early Middle Ages, clothing was typically simple and, particularly in the case of lower-class peoples, served only basic utilitarian functions such as modesty and protection from the elements. As time went on the advent of more advanced textile techniques and increased international relations, clothing gradually became more and more intricate and elegant, even with those under the wealthy classes, up into the renaissance.

== Female dress ==
=== Fifth and sixth centuries ===
The normal women's costume of this era was a long peplos-like garment, pulled up to the armpit and worn over a sleeved undergarment (usually another dress). The garment was clasped front to back by fastening brooches at the shoulders. The dress could be belted or girdled, with tools and personal items suspended from the belt. Women in this period may or may not have worn a head covering.

Fleeces and furs were probably used as garment lining or as warm outer garments. A simple poncho made with a neck-opening for the head could have been made from skins of domesticated sheep or cattle.

There is little evidence of footwear until the late sixth and seventh centuries. Agricultural laborers shown plowing and sowing in Anglo-Saxon illustrated manuscripts work barefoot, which may indicate that footwear was not the norm until the middle Anglo-Saxon era.

=== Seventh to ninth centuries ===
Changes in Anglo-Saxon women's dress began in the latter half of the sixth century in Kent and spread to other regions at the beginning of the seventh century. These fashion changes show the decreasing influence of Northern Europe and the increasing influence of the Frankish Kingdom and the Byzantine Empire and a revival of Roman culture. Linen is used more widely for garments and under-garments. Although there is little evidence to show whether women wore leggings or stockings under their gowns, it is more than likely that leg-coverings were worn by women during this period.

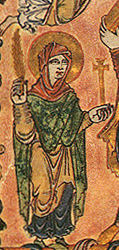
The Virgin Mary in Anglo-Saxon dress, New Minster Charter, 966

=== Tenth and eleventh centuries ===
Women typically wore a sleeveless overgarment, with or without a hood. If a hood was worn, it was either a scarf wrapped around the head and neck or an unconnected head covering with an opening for the face. It was assumed that the hooded style was influenced by Near Eastern art.

In contemporary art of this period, women are shown wearing ankle-length, tailored gowns. Gowns are often shown with a distinct border, sometimes in a contrasting color. Arms were usually covered; sleeves were often straight with a slight flare at the end. Braided or embroidered borders often decorated sleeves. By the eleventh century, multiple sleeve styles had come into fashion.

The girdles and buckled belts that were popular in the fifth and sixth century, with tools and personal items suspended from the belt, had gone out of fashion. Women wore simple ankle shoes and slippers. Archaeological evidence suggests that a variety of shoe styles were available.

=== Twelfth to fourteenth centuries ===
General attire

Around the year 1300, well-off women's gowns began fitting more tightly and had lower necklines. Clothing was layered and these layers were tightly bound to the body. Around this time, the surcoat came into use. By the end of the 14th century, the gown had replaced all garment items aside from the surcoat.

Basic garments now consisted of the smock, hose, kirtle, gown, belt, surcoat, girdle, cape, hood, and bonnet. Wealthier women would use fabrics and materials such as silk and fine linen; the lower classes would use wool and coarser linen. The skirt was developed during this period, and quickly eclipsed the petticoat in both popularity and use; use of a headdress, in various forms, (culminating in the hennin) was now an important element too.

The importation of luxurious fabrics increased over the period, and their use widened somewhat, but clothing remained very expensive. Very few women owned more than a few items of clothing.

Religious attire

Until the 16th century, religious women in the monastic order, like nuns, were required to wear a particular habit. It was made up of a tunic that used a cincture or a belt to secure it. On top of the tunic sat a scapular which was a long slender cloth. Lastly, their hair would be covered with a hood. It was very important that the women covered their hair because they did not want to come across as immodest. There were some religious women who preferred wearing a veil and a wimple (a cloth headdress) instead of the hood. The purpose of this habit was to portray the ideas associated with the monastic order such as conservatism, modesty, and purity. Additionally, this religious habit was able to distinguish one from other religious orders.

== Male dress ==
=== Fifth and sixth centuries ===
==== Common attire ====
Early Anglo-Saxon men, regardless of social rank, wore a cloak, tunic, trousers, leggings, and accessories. The short, fur-lined cloak was designed so that the skin of the animal faced outward and the fur brushed against the undergarments. However, woolen cloaks have also been found. The garment opened either at the front or at the right shoulder. A single brooch, usually circular in shape, fastened the square or rectangular cloak. Other means of fastening the cloth together included tying, lacing, or using a clasp, often made of natural materials such as thorn, bones, wood, or horns. The less prosperous wore woolen cloaks.

The tunic ended between the hip and the knee and had either long or short sleeves. Clasps were not needed to hold the tunic together because when pulled over the head it would sit snugly around the neck without the use of lacing or ties, indicating that the garment was one continuous piece. A belt or girdle was usually worn with the tunic and might have had a buckle, and, as Gale Owen-Crocker states, "pouched over the belt". Multiple tunics were worn at once so that the lower one, often short-sleeved, served as a shirt.

Trousers, traditionally worn under a short tunic or with a small cloak, were ankle length. If loose, the excess material was bunched around the waist and, as Owen-Crocker describes, "hung in folds around the legs". Garters or leggings accompanied narrow trousers. Pieces of fabric attached to the trousers forming belt loops so that the garment could be at held in place at the waist by a belt.

Leggings, usually worn in pairs, acted as additional protection for the legs. The first legging referred to as the legging proper or stocking, consisted of woven fabric or leather. The second was simply leather or fabric used to tie on the leggings or, if worn around the shin or foot, providing warmth and protection. The lower caste wore leggings made of ripped or cut cloth from old clothes, blankets, or bags whereas the upper caste had custom made leggings. The very rich people sometimes wore jewels.

Belts worn at the hips were more of a necessity rather than a luxury. Buckles were common and most faced the front; however, others have been found to face both sides or even, in some cases, were placed at the back of the body. Owen-Crocker mentions that "belt ornaments and tags" dangled from the belts of the Anglo-Saxons in addition to everyday equipment. Beads occasionally acted as alternatives, although not often. Leather belts, often decorated, were the most common. Intricate belts, worn to be seen, were placed in view while an additional belt or girdle held the trouser in place under the tunic.

The Anglo-Saxons usually covered their bare feet, except when working. Shoes were made of leather and secured with straps. Hats and hoods were commonly worn as were gloves and mittens.

=== Seventh to tenth centuries ===
==== General attire ====
Clothing of the 7th through the 9th centuries was similar to that of previous centuries and again all classes generally wore the same clothing, although distinctions among the social hierarchy began to become more noticeable through ornamented garments. These common pieces consisted of tunics, cloaks, jackets, pants, and shoes. As in the 5th and 6th centuries, a linen shirt acted as an undergarment. Men generally wore a knee-length linen or woolen tunic, depending on the season, over their shirts. The sleeves of the tunic were long and close-fitting and excess material was pushed up the arm from the elbow to the wrist so that "rolls" were formed in the material. The neck of the tunic opened as did both sides and a belt or girdle was usually worn around the waist. According to rank, embellishments adorned the collar of the tunic, waist, or border and for peasants, or the working classes, a plain tunic with sleeves was generally worn. Examples of these decorations included, as James Planché states, "gold and silver chains and crosses, bracelets of gold, silver or ivory, golden and jeweled belts, strings of amber and other beads, rings, brooches, [and] buckles". The nobility tended to wear longer tunics than the lower social classes.

A cloak, worn over the tunic, fastened on either the breast or a shoulder with the assistance of a brooch. Once in place, the brooch was left attached to the garment so that the cloak was slipped over the head. The cloak, knee-length and rectangular in shape, was fastened so that it appeared to be pleated or folded. Hoods and collars began to appear in the 9th century, and around the same time, the cloak began to be curbed by the same belt that was worn over the tunic. The wrap-over coat also made an appearance during this era. This knee-length coat wrapped over the front of the body. Its sleeves were, as Owen-Crocker says, "deep, [with] decorated cuffs which [were] mostly straight". For the lower classes, this coat tended to be plainer than that of the nobility.

The waistcoat or jacket appeared during this time as well. For those who could afford it, the jacket was made of fur while less costly ones were made of linen. This jacket was waist-length and tended to have a broad collar.

The trousers in this era were shortened to mid-thigh and stockings, made of leather, met them there. Atop the stockings, rounds of cloth, linen, or leather were worn which started at the ankle and ended just below the knee, as Planché explains, in "close rolls.. or crisscrossing each other sandal-wise". Planché states that socks began to be worn over the stocking and were "banded at the top". Shoes of this era, painted black, had an opening down the instep and were secured with straps. Anglo-Saxons appreciated shoes and thus all classes wore them. Common colors for this era consisted of red, blue, and green.

==== King ====
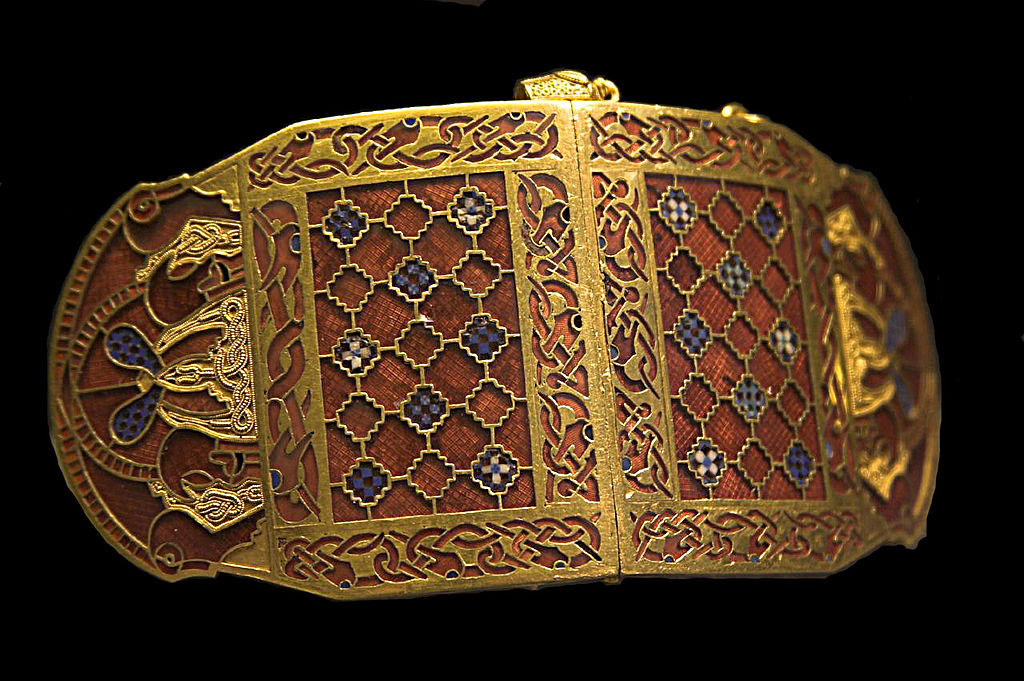
7th-century shoulder clasp for an Anglo-Saxon king

Until the 9th century, the king or reigning authority wore ringed byrne which, as Planché explains, was "formed of rings sewn flat upon a leather tunic". This person also carried a projecting shield and "long, broad, straight iron sword" as Planché states.

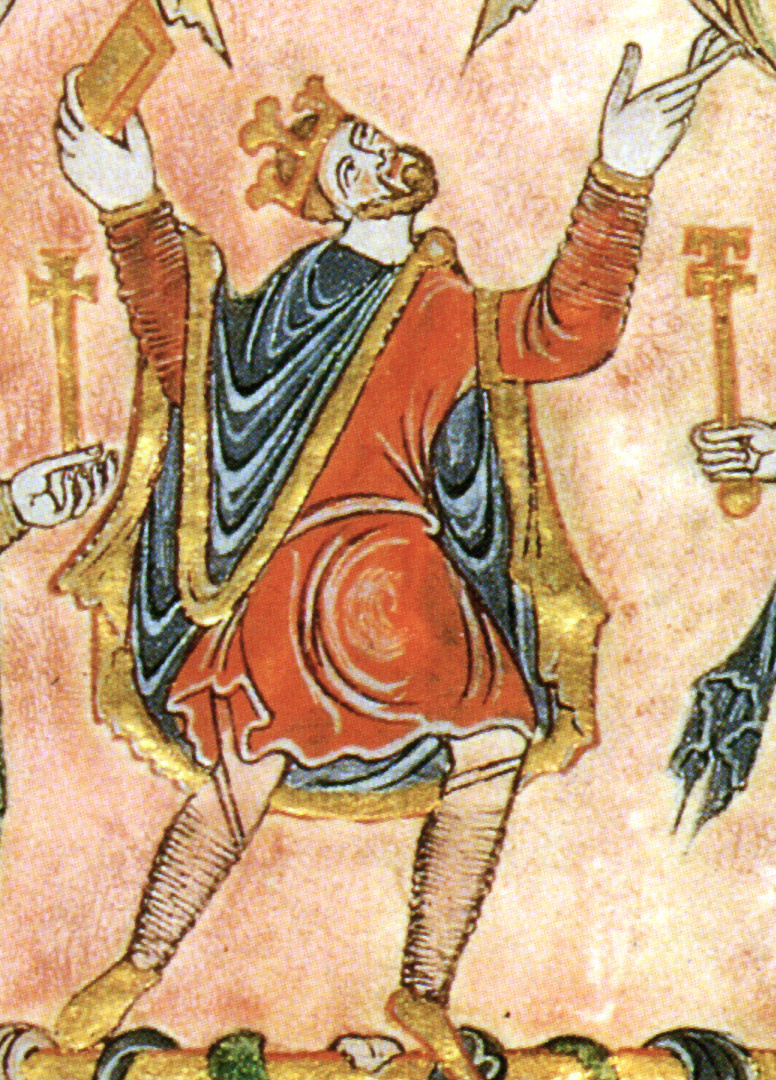
King Edgar of England from 959–975

A square crown was worn as was a longer cloak. Beginning in the 9th century, the metal of the king was inscribed and later in the century silk began to be worn by both the king and the nobility.

==== Military ====
Well-armed Anglo-Saxon soldiers wore wrap-over coats decorated like chain mail with sleeves that narrowed at the wrists, these were often embroiled with flowers or plants. Owen-Crocker explains that the belts of commanders were elaborate, wide, and fastened by "a narrow strap which was riveted to the broad belt and passed through a buckle which was much narrower than the belt itself" leaving the end of the belt to hang down. Also attached to the belt were pouches which allowed soldiers to carry their weapons. In the 9th and 10th centuries, military attire did not differ much from that of civil attire. The only changes were in the form of short linen tunics with metal collars and the addition of a sword, spear, shield, and helmet. Weapons and clothes fittings worn on the battlefield were highly decorated with jewelry techniques, as seen in the discoveries at Sutton Hoo and in the Staffordshire Hoard; the concept of parade wear did not exist for the Anglo-Saxons.

==== Clergy ====
Planché asserts that the clergy of the 9th and 10th centuries dressed similarly to the laity, except when saying mass. Beginning in the later 8th century, the clergy were forbidden to wear bright colors or expensive or valuable fabrics. Owen-Crocker mentions that their twill cloaks were generally shorter than those of the laity, reaching just below the waist, and Planché adds, that they wore linen stocking.

=== Eleventh century ===
==== General attire ====
Planché explains that in the 11th century, shortened tunics became popular as did shorter hairstyles and beard lengths. Piercings also became fashionable for men as did golden bracelets. During this era, men continued to wear tunics, cloaks, and trousers which did not vary much from their previous counterparts. Coifs became popular head-coverings and appeared to be "flat round cap[s]". Long stockings, with feet attached, were in style, and leg bandages and shoes continued to be worn. Short boots, those only extending to the ankle, were introduced in the latter part of the century, as were the pointed-toe pigaches.

==== Military attire ====
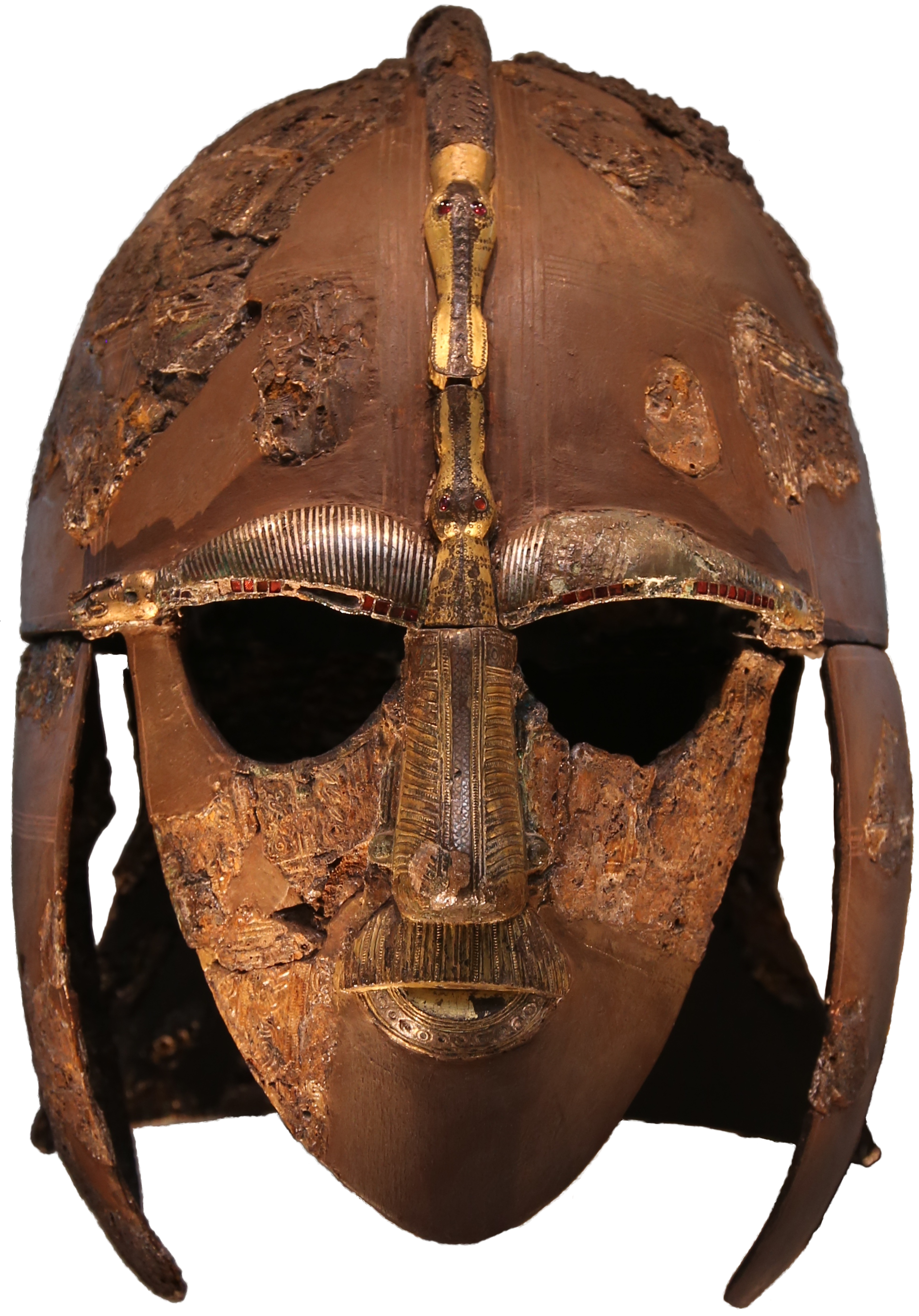
7th-century Anglo-Saxon helmet from Sutton Hoo

Military attire was simply regular clothing with the addition of adornments depending on the number of "marks" a soldier had. These additions consisted of a spear, ax, sword, bow, shield, steel cap, helmet, an iron coat, or a linen or cloth tunic. During this era, soldiers carried either round or crescent shaped shields usually painted red. Higher-ranking officials decorated their swords with various colors and insignias. In the middle half of the century, armor began to be made of leather and weapons were made light-weight. Previous mail tunics, found to be too heavy preventing the soldier from properly fighting, were replaced by the new leather armor, which consisted of overlapping flaps, cut like scales or leaves and each dyed a different color.

In the latter half of the century, warriors shaved their heads to resemble the clergy in order to confuse foreign spies. The cowl, which was covered in rings, emerged during this time and was worn under the helmet, which also had a new addition, the nose piece. The ringed knee-length tunic was slit in the front and back to allow for more comfortable riding. The length of the trousers became shorter. "Mascled armor" began to replace the traditional ringed armory. These new iron pieces were assembled to look like mesh or nets but a combination of the two patterns have been found to be used. Another variation included covering the body in rings and removing the sleeves from the tunic. Planché mentions that a "square pectoral" was added to the breast of the armor as added protection and were "quilted or covered with rings". A yellow border was added to the pectorals, sleeves, and skirts. Shields had two new adjustments: one strap looped around the arm while a second strap circled around the neck, allowing the soldier the use of both his hands.

==== Clergy ====
The clergy of the 11th century had shaved heads and wore bonnets, which, according to Planché, were "slightly sinking in the center, with the pendent ornaments of the mitre attached to the side of it". Other garments included the chasuble, the outermost liturgical vestment, which retained its shape, and the dalmatics, a tunic-like vestment with large, bell-shaped sleeves, which tended to be arched on the sides. The pastoral staff was generally found to be plain in colour and ornamentation.

=== Twelfth century ===
==== General attire ====
The 12th century brought changes in the civil attire for the inhabitants of the British Isles. The tunic was now close fitting with a long skirt. There was, as C. Willett and Phillis Cunnington describe, a "slit up in front to the thigh level" and the sleeves, now close fitting, were "bell-shaped" at the wrist or, the "lower portion [hung] to form a pendulous cuff which might be rolled up for action". Peasants wore tunics which were shorter and the sleeves were "tubular…[and] rolled back". The tunic could be worn with or without the girdle, which now carried the sword. Neck lines were either diagonal, from the neck moving across the chest, or horizontal, from the neck to the shoulder. The super tunic, worn with a girdle, was occasionally worn alone but was never paired with the aforementioned tunic. The sleeves of this super tunic had, as the Cunningtons state, "pendulous cuffs", which were uncommon, or were "loose and often elbow-length only". The super tunic was occasionally lined with fur.

The cloak and mantle, a cloak resembling a loose cape, were fastened either with a brooch or clasp, or as the Cunningtons describe, "the corner of the neck edge on one side was pulled through a ring sewn to the opposite corner, and then knotted to keep in position". For the rich, the cloak was lined with fur and for all classes beneath, the cloak was hooded and made of animal hide, with the hair facing out.

=== Thirteenth century ===
==== General attire ====
For the first half of the 13th century, linen braies were worn and then shortened to the knee in the second half of the century, which then became drawers or undergarments. Short stockings ended just below the knee and the border was occasionally decorated. Longer stockings, mid thigh length, could also be worn: as C. Willett and Phillis Cunnington say, they were "shaped to fit the leg, widening above the knee so that they could be pulled up over the braies". The stockings and girdle were tied together at a point in the top front of the stocking by which to keep it in place. Some stockings had stirrups, whole feet, or no feet. For hosiery, made of wool or leather, a "thin leather sole was attached" so that shoes would not need to be worn. Leg wear during the 12th century tended to be brightly coloured and stripes were popular.

All classes of men during the 12th century wore shoes or boots. Shoes, as the Cunningtons say, were "open over the foot and fastened in front of the ankle with a strap secured by a brooch or buckle". For the wealthy, the bands on shoes were decorated and designs were often found "over the foot or around the heel". Different styles of shoes began to appear during this era. One such, as the Cunningtons state, was "high around the ankle and slit down the sides or in front" while others were laced or had "short uppers but cut high behind the heel". Boots were most notably mid calf or knee length and laced down the front or along the inner side. These boots tended to be brightly coloured and had, in the Cunningtons' words, "turn over tops". Shorter boots, with pointed toes, were also worn and ended just above the ankle. Boots were made of leather from a cow or ox, cloth, fish skin, or, for those who could afford it, silk.

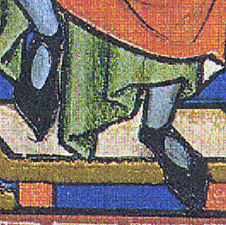
Shoes with ankle strap and open instep, 1250

Separate hoods also made an appearance. They were loose with, as the Cunningtons describe, a "pointed cowl" and were attached to a robe stretching to the shoulders. The cape was usually a single piece of material and thus had to be put on over the head. The Cunningtons state that the "pointed Phrygian cap," or the "small, round cap with stalk or with a rolled brim and with or without the stalk" or the "stalked soft cap, resembling a beret" were worn. Travelers wore "hats with large brims and low crowns…over the hood" which tied under the chin. Small hats with round crowns and, the Cunningtons say, "turned-down brim, decorated with a knob instead of a stalk" were also worn, as were coifs, which was a "close fitting plain linen bonnet which covered the ears and confined the hair" and tied under the chin. The coif could be worn with other hats or hoods.

Accessories for 12th century English men became more decorated. The girdle, mid century, became more elaborate in its ornamentation and in the latter half of the century, was, "tied like a sash in front with hanging ends" or, if "long and elaborate, was fastened with ornamental buckles" as the Cunningtons depict. Wallets and purses, in the early half of the century, were hung from the girdle or the breech girdle and in the latter half were placed under the tunic, out of sight. During this era gloves became fashionable for the nobility, although they were seldom worn. Rings, brooches, buckles, clasps, and "ornamental fillets of gold and silver", according to the Cunningtons, were worn by the ruling classes. Wool, linen, and silk continued to be used, as was leather, which the peasants used for tunics and mantle and left the hair on facing outward. Garments were also embroidered during this era.

Men continued to wear both short and long tunics with a girdle; however the slit up the front was removed. A new style was introduced in this era in which the sleeves and body were cut from one piece of material. A wide armhole, which extended to the waist, was left open and the sleeves were cut in order to, as the Cunningtons state, "slope off to a narrow tight cuff at the wrist". The super tunic of the 11th century continued to be worn by the less fashionable, the lower classes of society, and the girdle was optional.

Five new styles of the super tunic were introduced in this era. The first consisted of a front and back panel which extended from the shoulders to the calf level. The two panels were sewn together or clasped together near the waist, where they were met by a slit up the front. The neck opening was large so that the tunic could be put on over the head and a belt was not usually worn with this tunic. The second new style was more "voluminous" as the Cunningtons describe it, and hung in folds to a length between the knees and the ankles. The sleeves gathered at the shoulders and extended beyond the hands. A vertical slit was cut in the upper arm of the sleeve to allow unrestrained movement. This garment, like the previous, was put on over the head and a hood was often attached. The third style was much looser than the previous ones. The sleeves could extended to just below the elbow or could be worn short and wide. A buckled belt was optional. The fourth super tunic, or garnache, was knee length and the material was cut wide at the shoulders to allow the material to "fall down on each side, predicting cape-like sleeves," as the Cunningtons put it. The sides of this tunic could be clasped at the waist, sewn from the waist to the hem, or left open and was traditionally beltless. The last style was simply sleeveless and worn with a belt. For these cloaks and hoods red, Irish cloth was popular.

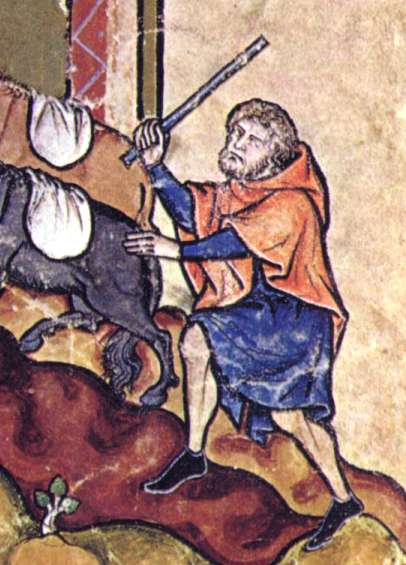
Working man of the 13th century

Fitchets, resembling modern day pockets, also appeared in the 13th century. Vertical slits were cut in the super tunic, which did not have any side openings, to allow access to purse or keys slung from the girdle of the tunic.

Men's headwear of the 13th century, as the Cunningtons illustrate, consisted of the hood, which was sometimes buttoned, and stalked round caps and large rimmed traveling hats, both seen in the previous century. New to this era were hats with "round brim[s] turned up at the back which could be worn reversed with the turn-up in front". Hats with round crowns also made an appearance and were sometimes found with a "knob on the crown" or with a "moderate brim with a downward slope or a rolled brim". The coif continued to be worn much more frequently.

During this era garments such as cloaks, mantles, and stockings remained unchanged. However, during this era, stockings were sometimes tied with narrow strips of material below the knee to hold the stocking in place. Leg bandages for the nobility became popular which criss-crossed and extended above the knee.

Shoes during this era were designed so that each shoe was cut explicitly for an individual's foot. Shoes were plain, and most were closed around the ankle and were laced or buckled along the inner side of the foot. Other shoes exposed the top of the foot and either stretched high behind the ankle or were clasped near the ankle by an instep strap. Boots, as the Cunningtons describe, were briefly coloured along the top, had a much looser fit, and were barely extended to the calf. Calthrop adds that boots were "turned over a little at the top".

Men's accessories were similar to those of the 11th century. Gloves continued to be worn by the nobility and could be long, stretching to the elbow, or short, wrist length, and began to be decorated, the Cunningtons explain, "with a broad strip of gold embroidery down the back as far as the knuckles". By the end of the century, gloves were more widely worn and were ornamented with silver or gilded buttons. Calthrop also includes that long hair and neatly trimmed beards were in style for 13th century men.

=== Fourteenth century ===
==== General attire ====
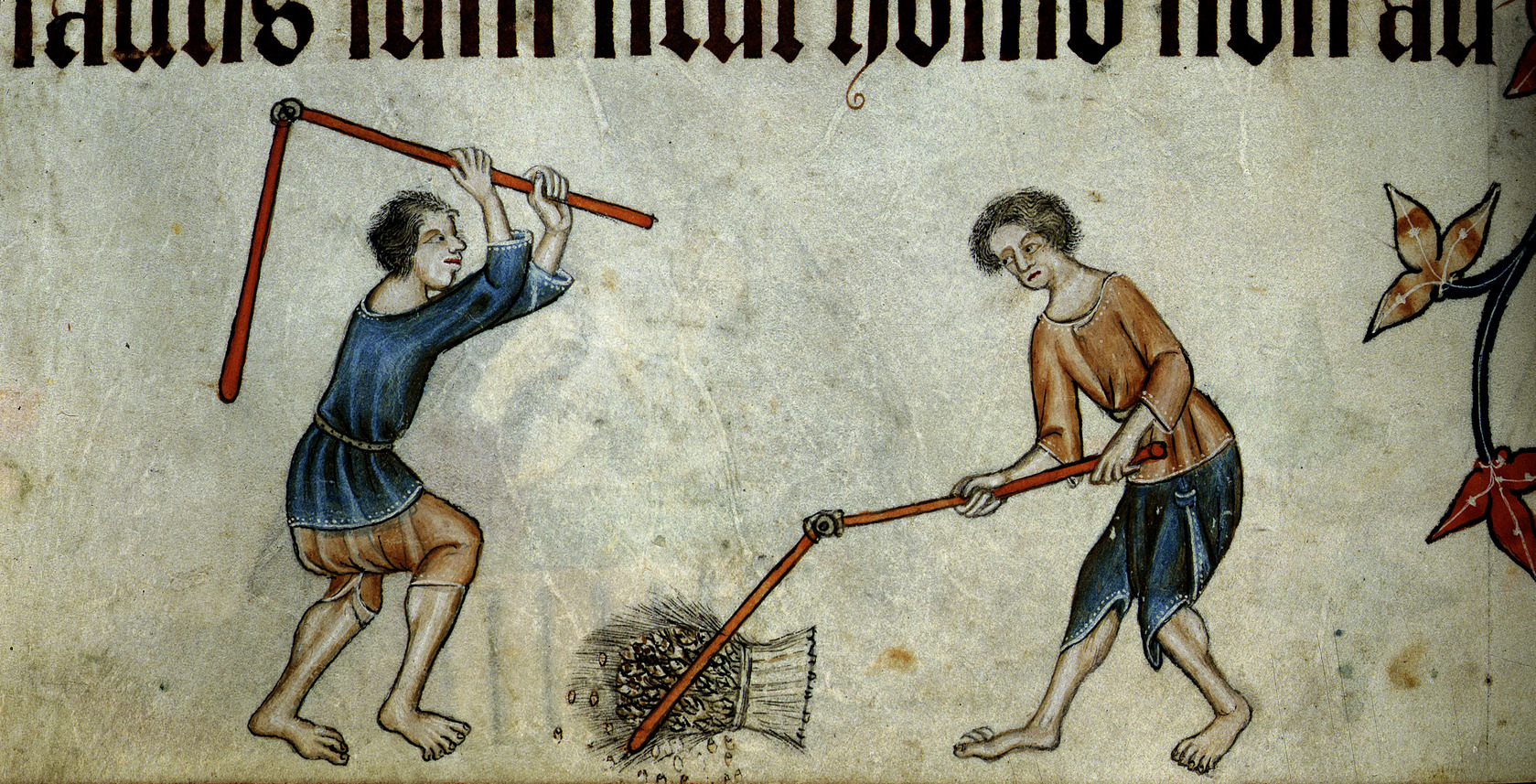
Threshing sheaf of two men, these are wearing a Braies - Luttrell Psalter (c.1325-1335)

Men's clothing of the 14th century was much more form fitting than its 13th century counterparts. During this era, many of the standard pieces that had been worn by the Britons evolved into new garments and took on different names. P. Cunnington explains that loose garments, such as the tunic and super tunic, from previous centuries continued to be worn by the lower classes who were less concerned with fashion. These loose garments, as C. Cunnington states, were slit up the front, had sleeves, and were worn with a girdle. In addition, they could be shortened to the hip. The gipon, also called a pourpoint or doublet, emerged during the 14th century. It replaced the tunic and was knee length and close-fitting. The gipon was not designed with any folds or gathers as the tunic was. The sleeves were long and tight and the neck was low. The bodice was padded and the garment was either buttoned or laced down the front, but for the lower classes it was only buttoned to the waist. The gipon was traditionally worn over a shirt and if worn with an outer garment, a belt was not worn. At the end of the century, the gipon was shortened to above the mid-thigh and was worn with a belt at hip level

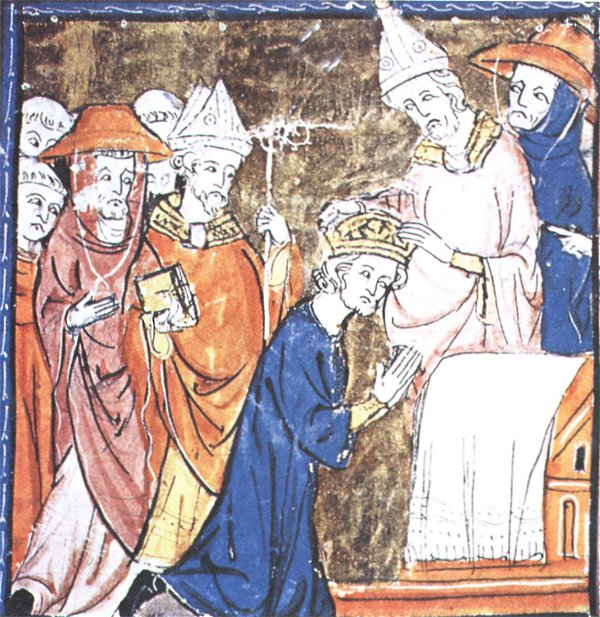
The coronation of Charlemagne as depicted in the 14th century

The outer garment of this era was known as the cote-hardie and replaced the super tunic of previous centuries. This new low necked, knee length piece was tight fitting and buttoned or laced down the front to waist level, where it then "flared into a full skirt which was open in the front" as C. Cunnington describes. The complex sleeves of the cote-hardie extended, in the front, to the elbow and, in back, hung in flaps which tapered and elongated. Sleeves during this era were decorated. A belt or girdle was worn with this new garment. The less fortunate wore looser cote-hardies which did not fasten in the front. Instead, they were one piece and were put on over the head. Cloaks and capes continued to be worn as outdoor wear and didn't change from the previous century.

Men's stockings of the 14th century were lengthened and tied to the region, so that it was hidden under the skirt. Shorter stockings were tied to garters with stripes of wool or linen. Shorter boots and shoes also become fashionable. Woolen soles were added to shoes as were straps.

The hood continued to be worn by men during this era. However, its shape changed. The pointed cowl was lengthened as P. Cunnington describes, "into a long streamer.. and from this another head-dress was made which was made in the form of a turban with a fall-over flap made from the hood cape". Stalked caps remained popular and small hats with close, turned up brims emerged. Toward the end of the century men began putting feathers in their hats for decoration.

Gloves spread amongst the social hierarchy so that even those of the working class were wearing them in the 14th century. For this class, only the thumb and two sections existed for the fingers.

== Clothing and class ==
The lowest classes in the Middle Ages did not have access to the same clothing as nobility. Poor men and women working in the fields or wet or muddy conditions often went barefoot. Upper and middle-class women wore three garments and the third garment was either a surcoat, bliaut, or cotehardie. These were often lavish garments, depending on the wealth of the person wearing them, and could have trimmings in fur or silk decorated with elaborate designs. Because of the cost of fabric, the working classes hardly wore this third garment.

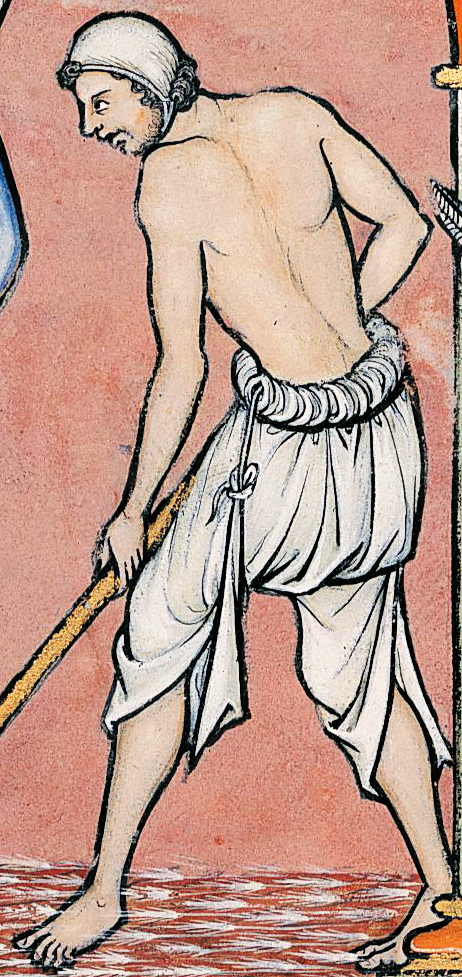
13th-century peasant working barefoot in the fields

Another marker of the upper classes was an elaborate headdress. These could involve wires, draping fabric and pointed caps. Again, because of the cost the poor could not afford these and instead wore simple cloth veils called wimples that "draped over the head, around the neck and up to the chin". Working women wore ankle length dresses and men wore short tunics and breeches. The longer the garment, the higher in station a person was. This is evident in the sumptuary laws of 1327 which states "coming to the lowest class no serving man is to use 2½ yards in a short gown or 3 in a long one". Also, serving men such as servants or attendants usually did not wear cloaks, and for the nobles who did it served to distinguish them from the masses.

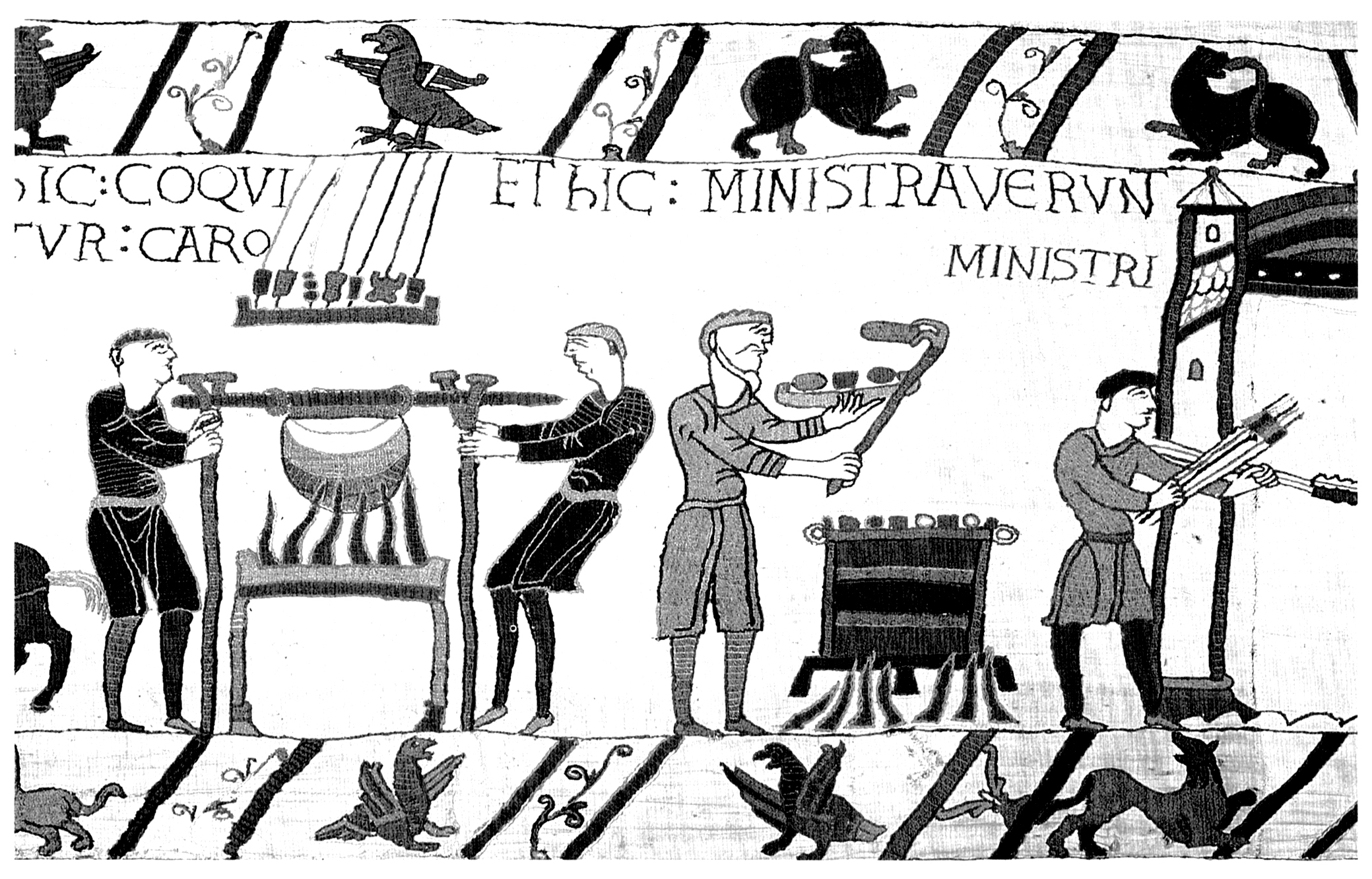
Example of serving men in short tunics and lacking cloaks

While most of the peasant women wove their fabric and then made their own clothing, the wealthy were able to afford tailors, furriers, and embroiderers. The wealthiest, such as royalty, would have "all these craftsmen on staff, sometimes one per each adult in the household".

Social status was of the utmost importance during the Middle Ages, and this idea was exemplified through fashion. For example, it was generally understood that scarlet tones, such as red and purple, were important items in the wardrobes of royalty. More specifically, these colours became reserved for Kings and Princes, and denoted luxury and wealth. The medieval sumptuary laws or "acts of apparel" were put into place to regulate the clothing choices of people during that time. Those who supported the enactment of such laws did so because the laws emphasized the differences between the classes, and clearly defined what those differences are. For example, the 1363 statute to the Clothing Law of 1337 states that wives of yeomen and handicraftsmen may not wear any veil or kerchief made of silk...the higher-status groups, however, are allowed to wear whatever imported items they want. This clearly states the understood division between the rich and poor during this era, and the importance of keeping the classes defined as separate entities. There were rules for every item of clothing; lower-class women were banned from wearing expensive veils. Only wives and daughters of wealthy men could wear velvet or satin. There was an unfair discontinuity in the rules; lower class citizens could never wear an item designated for the upper class, whereas the upper class could wear anything that suited them. For example, wives and daughters of servants were not to wear veils that cost more than twelve pence.

The English sumptuary acts of 1363 go into explicit detail about clothing items which were reserved for those below the king's status, putting restrictions on coat length and shoe height. In this legislation, the intention was to prevent men from acting as if they were from a higher class by way of how they dressed.

The laws specifically stated that a man was to dress within the status in which he was born. The acts depicted what clothing was to be worn and also clearly stated how the classes were ranked, with kings and royalty at the top and servants at the bottom. Most of these organized lists did not include all groups of people. The majority of the lists consisted of divisions of the upper and middle classes, while the lower classes were neglected altogether. This was because the middle class was considered most likely to violate the clothing laws because they were supposedly most influenced by social pressures, whereas lower-class people did not have the capabilities to dress according to a higher ranking even if they desired to do so. In fact, any mention of lower classes was done so out of necessity in order to complete the social hierarchy.

== Textiles used ==
The most common material used was wool, with the wool ranging in texture and quality based on the type of sheep it came from. (Note: See, for example broadcloth, fustian.) The quality could range from the very coarse and undyed for the lower class to extremely fine with designs and colour for the upper class. Linen and hemp were other fabrics used, and were utilized often by the lower classes as undergarments and head coverings. Also, silk was a popular material used by the wealthy and was imported from Asia. After the crusades, fabrics such as damasks, velvets, and satin were brought back to England, as was samite. Animal skins were also used such as "sheep-skin cloaks… in winter to keep out the cold and rain". Leather was used to produce items such as shoes, belts, gloves and armor.

The middle class could usually afford to dye their wool colours like blue and green. The wealthy could afford to add elaborate designs to their clothing as well as dying it red and black, expensive colours for the time. Purple was also considered a colour of royalty and was reserved for kings or religious figures such as the pope.

== See also ==
- England
- 1100–1200 in fashion
- 1200–1300 in fashion
- 1300–1400 in fashion
- Anglo-Saxon dress
- History of clothing and textiles
- Early Middle Ages
- High Middle Ages
- Early medieval European dress
- Anglo-Saxon brooches
