= Early medieval European dress =

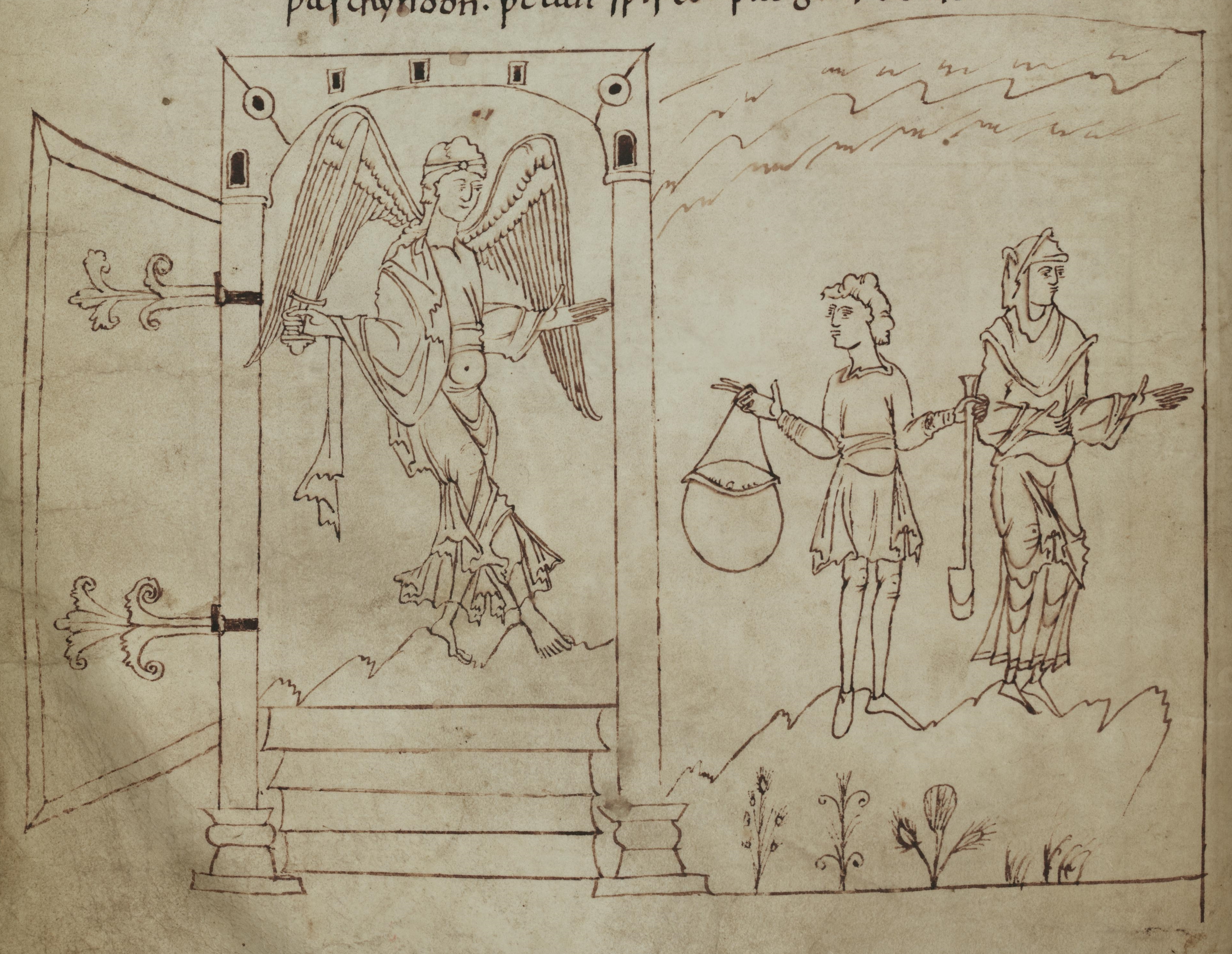
Anglo-Saxon Adam and Eve from the Junius manuscript, c. 950. The angel wears iconographic dress.

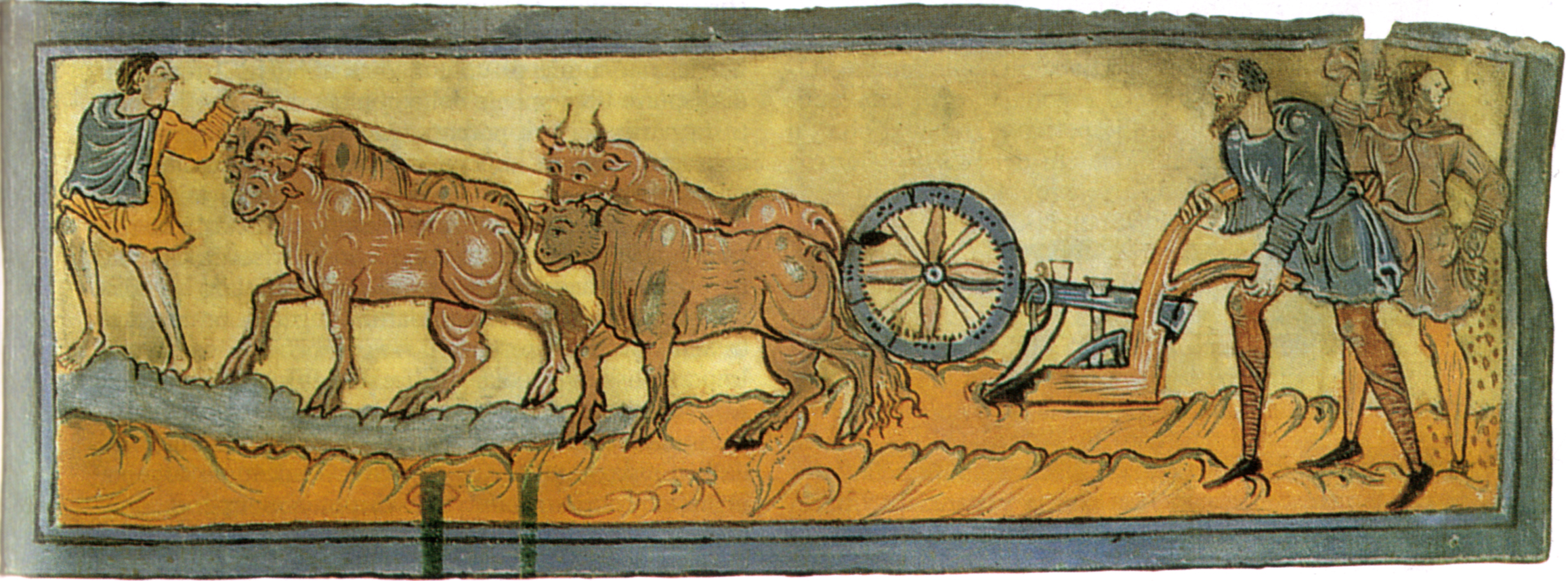
English ploughmen, c. 1000

Early medieval European dress, from about 400 AD to 1100 AD, changed very gradually. The main feature of the period was the meeting of late Roman costume with that of the invading peoples who moved into Europe over this period. For a period of several centuries, people in many countries dressed differently depending on whether they identified with the old Romanised population, or the new populations such as Franks, Anglo-Saxons, or Visigoths. The most easily recognisable difference between the two groups was in male costume, where the invading peoples generally wore short tunics, with belts, and visible trousers, hose or leggings. The Romanised populations, and the Church, remained faithful to the longer tunics of Roman formal costume, coming below the knee, and often to the ankles. By the end of the period, these distinctions had finally disappeared, and Roman dress forms remained mainly as special styles of clothing for the clergy – the vestments that have changed relatively little up to the present day.

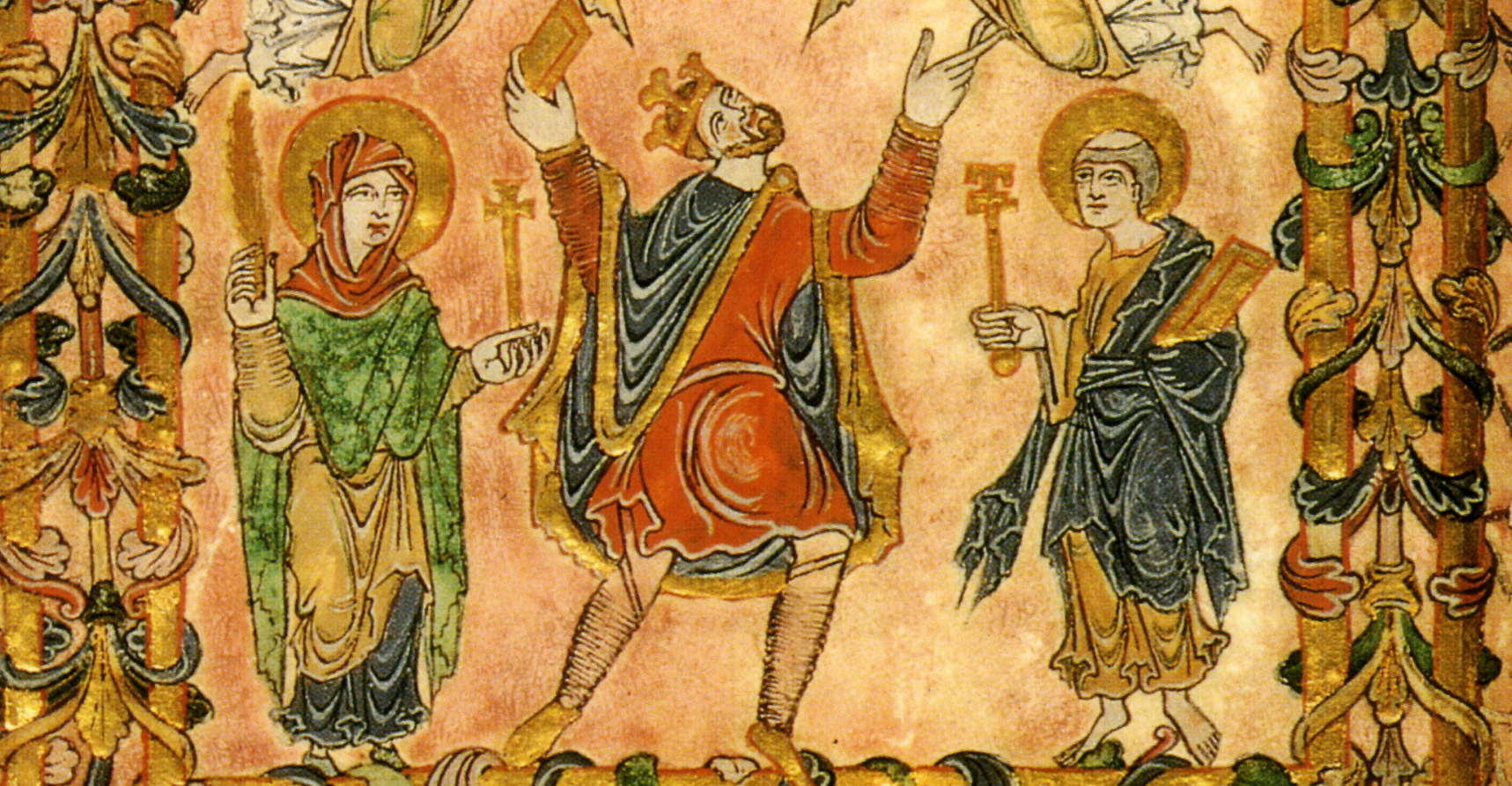
Clothing worn by Anglo-Saxons, as seen in the Frontispiece of the Winchester New Minster Charter of 966,

Many aspects of clothing in the period remain unknown. This is partly because only the wealthy were buried with clothing; it was rather the custom that most people were buried in cloth burial shrouds, also called "winding sheets". Fully dressed burial may have been regarded as a pagan custom, and an impoverished family was probably glad to keep a serviceable set of clothing in use. Clothing was expensive throughout the period.

== History ==
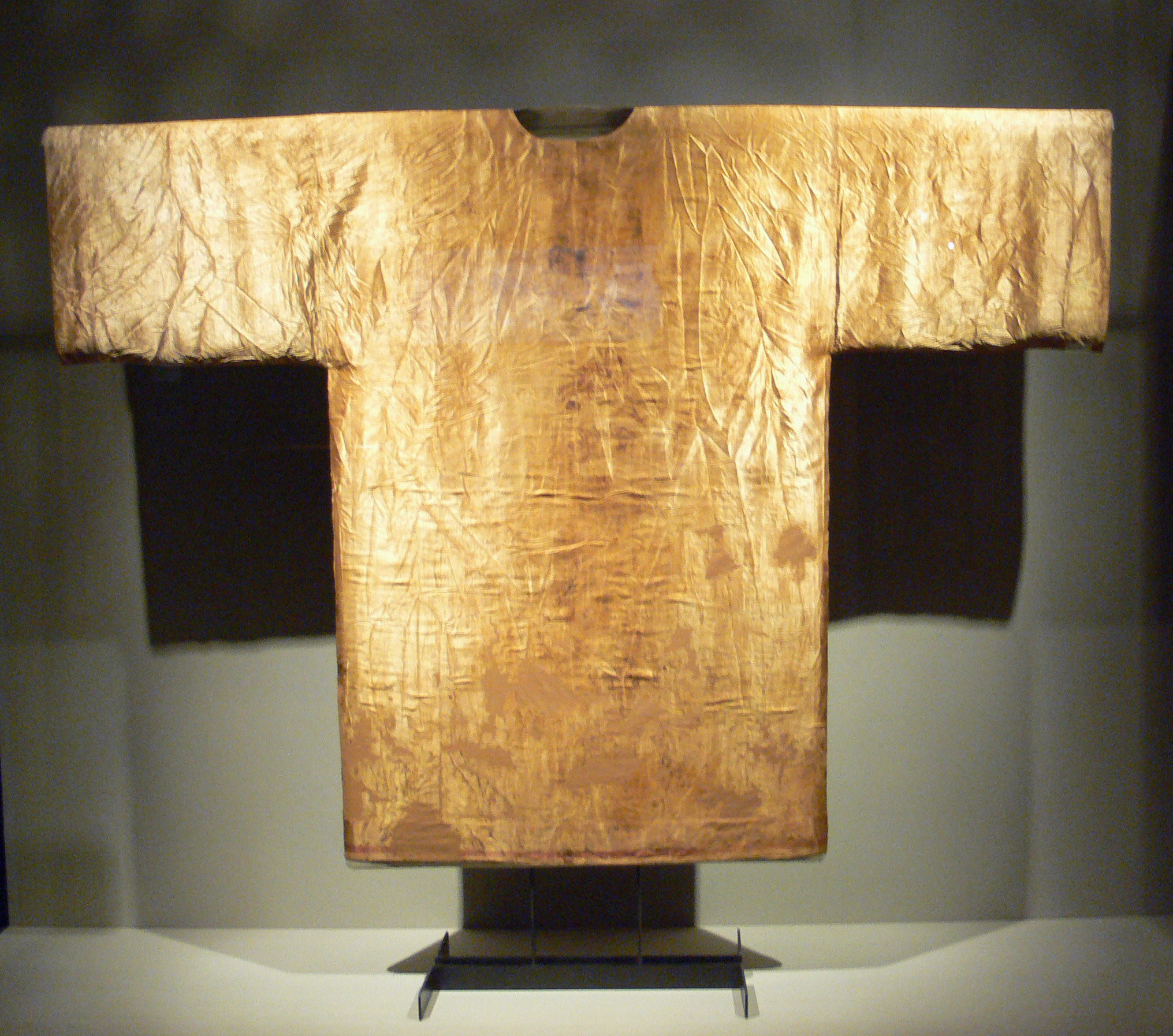
11th century vestments of Pope Clement II

For many centuries people had worn simply sewn T-shaped tunics that they made themselves. It was only in the 11th century that a professional tailor class began to develop techniques to make fitted fashions, for elite classes. This could go to the other extreme, making clothes awkward to wear; 12th century fashions were often very tightly fitted to the torso, with sleeves both very loose and long.

== Materials ==
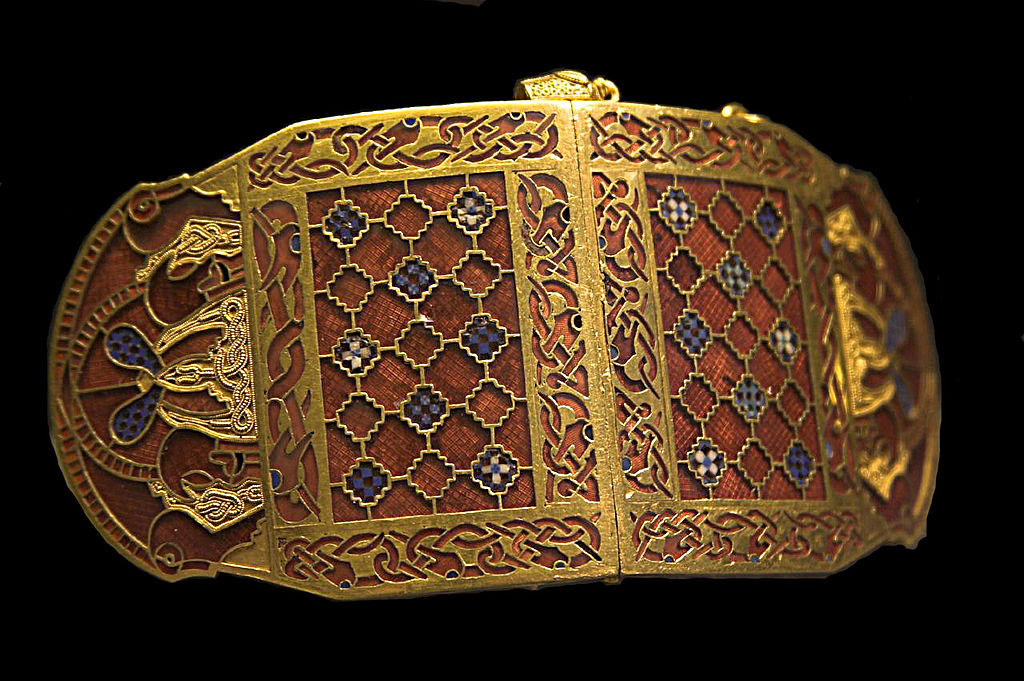
Shoulder-clasps for an Anglo-Saxon king of the 7th century, found at Sutton Hoo

Apart from the elite, most people in the period had low living standards, and clothes were probably home-made, usually from cloth made at a village level, and very simply cut. The elite imported silk cloth from the Byzantine and later Muslim worlds, and also probably cotton. They also could afford bleached linen and dyed and simply patterned wool woven in Europe itself. But embroidered decoration was probably very widespread, though not usually detectable in art. Most people probably wore only wool or linen, usually undyed, and leather or fur from locally hunted animals.

Archaeological finds have shown that the elite, especially men, could own superb jewellery, most commonly brooches to fasten their cloak, but also buckles, purses, weapon fittings, necklaces and other forms. The Sutton Hoo finds and the Tara Brooch are two of the most famous examples from Ireland and Britain in the middle of the period. In France, over three hundred gold and jewelled bees were found in the tomb of the Merovingian king Childeric I (died 481; all but two bees have since been stolen and lost), which are thought to have been sewn onto his cloak. Metalwork accessories were the clearest indicator of high-ranking persons. In Anglo-Saxon England, and probably most of Europe, only free people could carry a seax or knife, and both sexes normally wore one at the waist, to use for all purposes including as personal cutlery or self-defence.

=== Decoration ===
Both men's and women's clothing was trimmed with bands of decoration, variously embroidery, tablet-woven bands, or colourful borders woven into the fabric in the loom. The famous Anglo-Saxon opus anglicanum needlework was sought after as far away as Rome. Anglo-Saxons wore decorated belts.

== Men's clothing ==
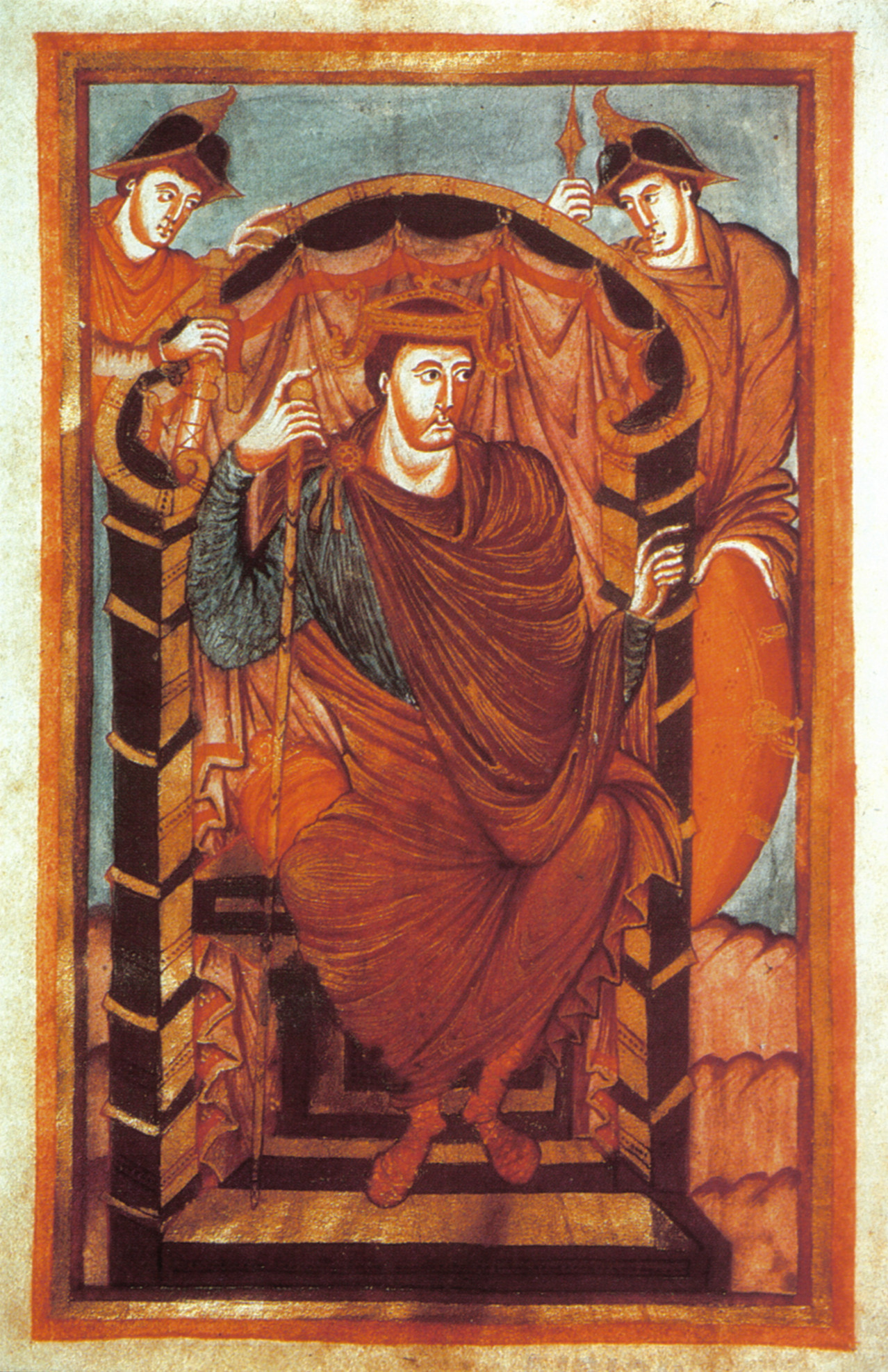
King Lothair I is shown in a cloak fastened on one shoulder worn over a long-sleeved tunic and cross-gartered hose, c. 850

The primary garment was the tunic — generally a long fabric panel, folded over with a neck-hole cut into the fold, and sleeves attached. It was typical for the wealthy to display their affluence with a longer tunic made of finer and more colorful cloth, even silk or silk-trimmed. The tunic was usually belted, with either a leather or strong fabric belt. Depending on climate, trousers were tailored either loose or tight (or not worn at all if the weather was warm). The most basic leggings were strips of cloth wound round the leg, and held in place by long laces, presumably of leather, which is called cross-gartering. This may have been done with loose-fitting trousers also. Tighter-fitting hose were also worn.

Over this a sleeved tunic was worn, which for the upper classes gradually became longer towards the end of the period. For peasants and warriors it was always at the knee or above. For winter, outside or formal dress, a cloak or mantle completed the outfit. The Franks had a characteristic short cape called a "saie", which barely came to the waist. This was fastened on the left shoulder (so as not to impede sword strokes) by a brooch, typically a fibula and later a round brooch on the Continent, and nearly always a round one for Anglo-Saxons, while in Ireland and Scotland the particular style of the penannular or Celtic brooch was most common. In all areas the brooch could be a highly elaborate piece of jewellery in precious metal at the top of society, with the most elaborate Celtic brooches, like the Tara Brooch and Hunterston Brooch, perhaps the most ornate and finely made of all. The "cappa" or chaperon, a one-piece hood and cape over the shoulders was worn for cold weather, and the Roman straw hat for summer fieldwork presumably spread to the invading peoples, as it was universal by the High Middle Ages. Shoes, not always worn by the poor, were mostly the simple turnshoe – typically a cowhide sole and softer leather upper, which were sewn together, and then turned inside out.

=== Charlemagne ===
The biographers of Charlemagne record that he always dressed in the Frankish style, which means that he wore similar if superior versions of the clothes of better-off peasants over much of Europe for the later centuries of the period:

He used to wear the national, that is to say, the Frank dress: next to his skin a linen shirt and linen breeches, and above these a tunic fringed with silk; while hose fastened by bands covered his lower limbs, and shoes his feet, and he protected his shoulders and chest in winter by a close-fitting coat of otter or marten skins..... He despised foreign costumes, however handsome, and never allowed himself to be robed in them, except twice in Rome, when he donned the Roman tunic, chlamys, and shoes; the first time at the request of Pope Hadrian, the second to gratify Leo, Hadrian's successor. — Einhard

No English monarch of the time had his dress habits recorded in such detail. The biographers also record that he preferred English wool for his riding-cloaks (sagæ), and complained to Offa of Mercia about a trend to make cloaks imported into Frankia impractically short. A slightly later narrative told of his dissatisfaction with the short cloaks imported from Frisia: "What is the use of these pittaciola: I cannot cover myself up with them in bed, when riding I cannot defend myself against wind and rain, and getting down for Nature's call, the deficiency freezes the thighs". He was slightly over six feet tall.

=== Clergy ===
At the beginning of this period the clergy generally dressed the same as laymen in post-Roman populations; this changed completely during the period, as lay dress changed considerably but clerical dress hardly at all, and by the end all ranks of clergy wore distinctive forms of dress.

Clergy wore special short hairstyles called the tonsure; in England the choice between the Roman tonsure (the top of the head shaven) and the Celtic tonsure (only the front of the head shaven, from ear to ear) had to be resolved at the Synod of Whitby, in favour of Rome. Wealthy churches or monasteries came during this period to use richly decorated vestments for services, including opus anglicanum embroidery and imported patterned silks. Various forms of Roman-derived vestment, including the chasuble, cope, pallium, stole, maniple and dalmatic became regularised during the period, and by the end there were complicated prescriptions for who was to wear what, and when. To a large extent these forms of vestment survive today in the Catholic and (even more conservative) Anglican churches. The same process took place in the Byzantine world over the same period, which again retains early medieval styles in Eastern Orthodox vestments.

Secular (i.e. non-monastic) clergy usually wore a white alb, or loose tunic, tied at the waist with a cord (formally called a cincture), when not conducting services. Senior clergy seem always to have fastened their cloaks with a brooch in the centre of their chest, rather than at their right shoulder like laymen, who needed their sword-arm unencumbered.

== Women's clothing ==
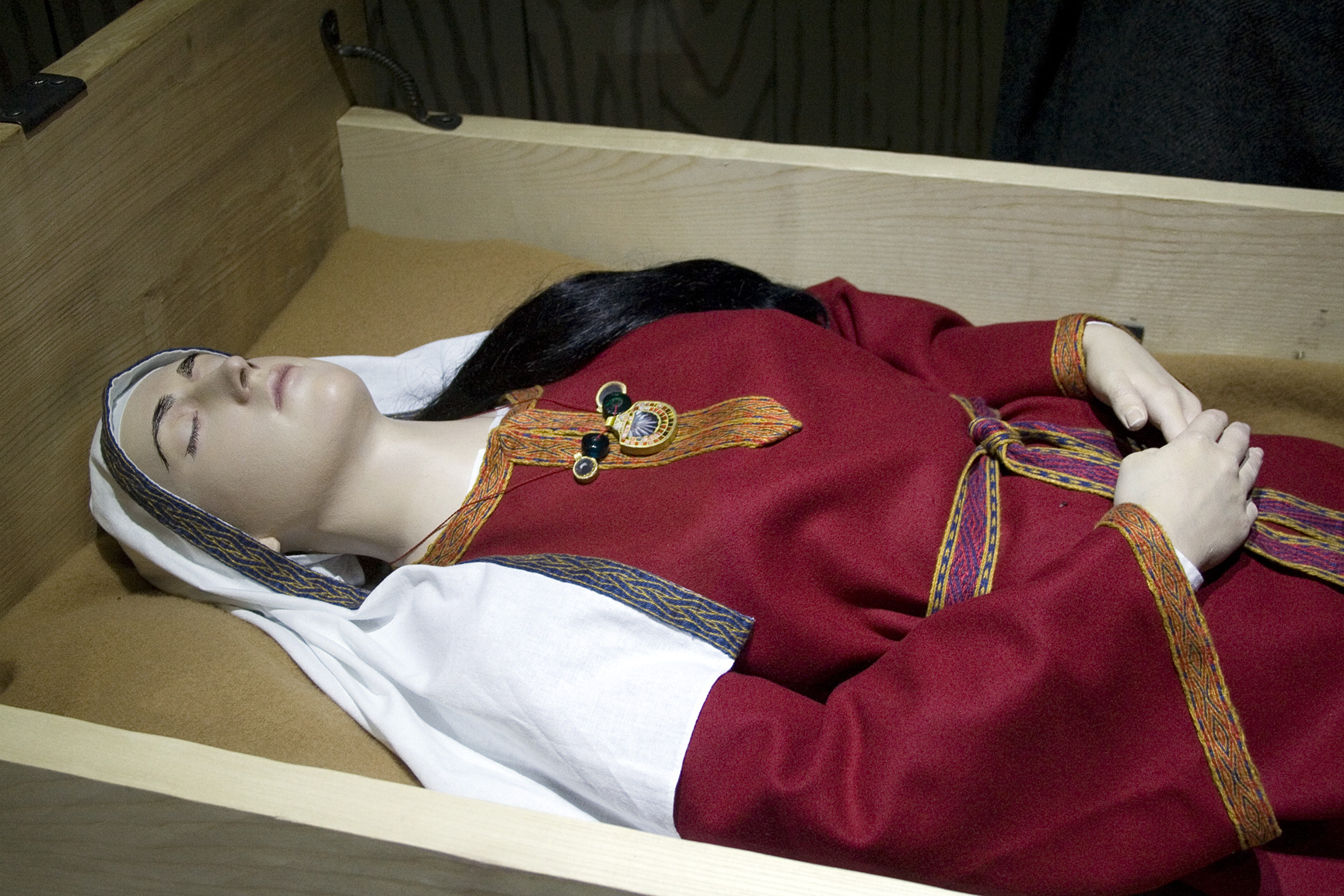
Reconstruction from Kirkleatham Museum of the body of the Street House "Saxon Princess" in her bed. 7th Century AD, Northumbria, England

Women's clothing in Western Europe went through a transition during the early medieval period as the migrating Germanic tribes adopted Late Roman symbols of authority, including dress. In Northern Europe, at the beginning of the period around 400 - 500 AD in Continental Europe and slightly later in England, women's clothing consisted at least one long-sleeved tunic fitted at the wrists and a tube-like garment, sometimes called a peplos, worn pinned at the shoulders. This garment was carried with the Germanic Migrations to Iberia and Southern Europe. These garments could be decorated with metal applique, embroidery, and woven bands.

After around 500 AD, women's clothing moved towards layered tunics. In the territories of the Franks and their eventual client tribes the Alemanni and Bavarii, as well as in East Kent, women wore a long tunic as an inner layer and a long coat, closed in the front with multiple brooches and a belt, as an outer layer. An example of this can be seen in the interpretations of the grave of Queen Arnegunde. Not all graves identified as female contain the brooches necessary to close the front of the "coat dress", indicating that not all women wore that style, or at least that not all women were buried in that style. The brooches may have been too expensive for most women. The presence or absence of oval brooches in graves was seen as an indicator of social and marital status. Graves of shorter length were thought to be those of children and unmarried women who did not wear oval brooches, while longer graves were most likely those of married women who wore these brooches. However, an analysis of Solberg suggests that the absence of brooches in graves cannot be solely attributed to unmarried or underage women. Instead, less prosperous but still free farmers also did not wear these brooches. This research points to the fact that oval brooches were worn by women who had the same legal position as men or were in a position of authority on a farm.

The women of later Anglo-Saxon England, outside of East Kent, mostly wore an ensemble of multiple layered tunics. These women were particularly well known for their embroidery and may have decorated their clothing with silk and wool embroidery or woven bands. These tunics are often interpreted as having a style of neckline called a "keyhole neckline" that may have facilitated breast-feeding. This neckline would have been closed with a brooch for modesty and warmth. In later Anglo-Saxon England, there is visual evidence for a large poncho-like garment that may have been worn by noble or royal women.

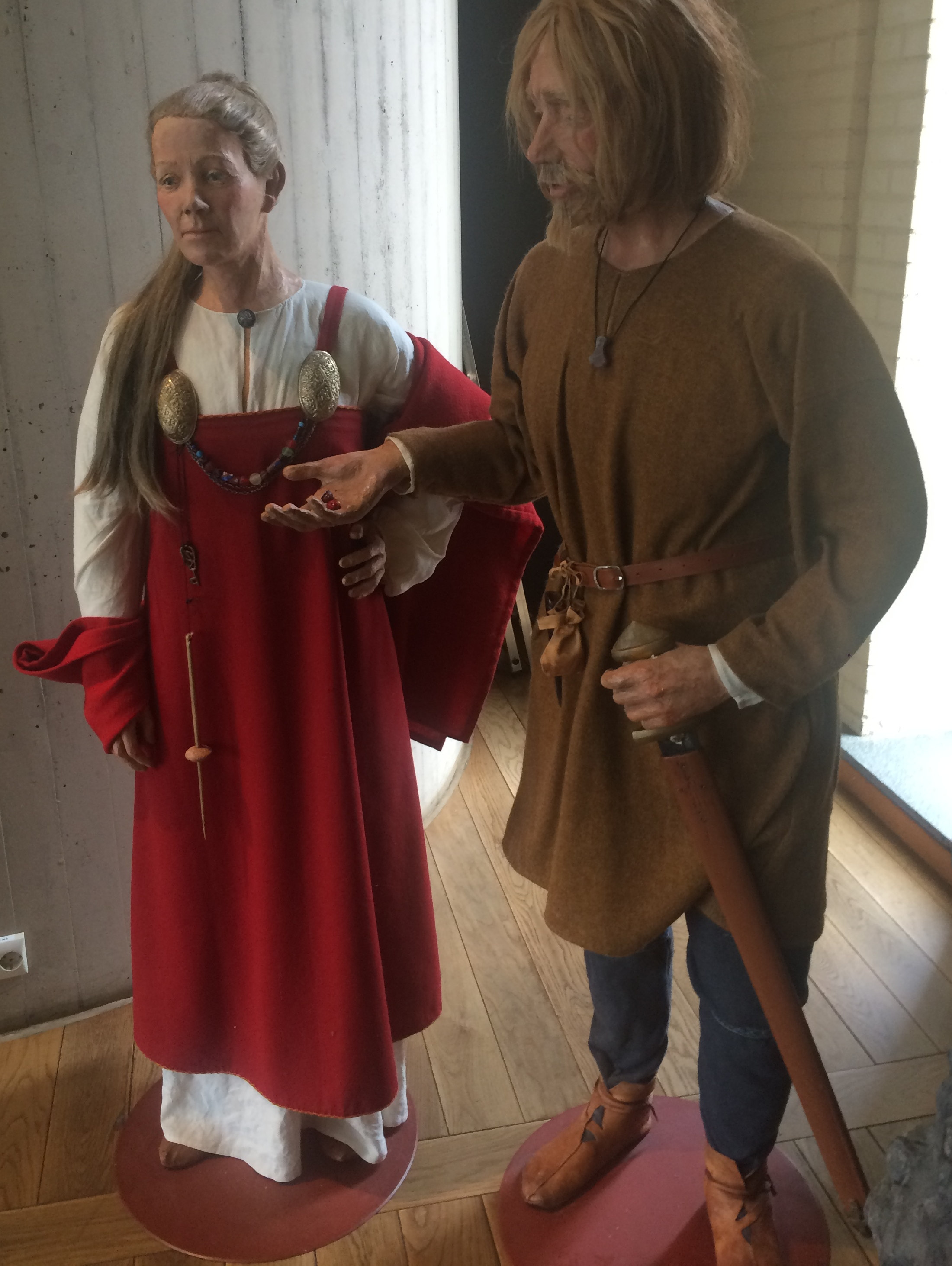
An interpretation of the Scandinavian Apron Dress from Stavanger, Norway

The most famous garment of early medieval Scandinavia is the so-called Apron Dress (also called a trägerrock, hängerock, or smokkr). This may have evolved from the peoples of the early Germanic Iron Age. The garment is often interpreted as a tube shape (either fitted or loose) that is worn with straps over the shoulder and large brooches (sometimes called "turtle brooches") at the upper chest. Examples of appliqued silk bands used as decoration have been found in a number of graves. Not all graves identified as belonging to women contain the brooches that typify this type of garment, indicating that some women wore a different style of clothing. There is evidence from Dublin that at least some Norse women wore caps or other head-coverings, it is unclear however how pervasive this practice was.

On all top layers, the neckline, sleeves, and hems might be decorated with embroidery, tablet weaving, or appliqued silks, very richly so for the upper classes. Hose or socks may have been worn on the legs. Veils or other head coverings appear in art depicting northern European women beginning with the Romans, however this is not universal. More pervasive use of headcoverings, especially for married women, appears to follow the Christianization of the various Germanic tribes. Fur is described in many classical accounts of the Germanic tribes but has not survived well in archaeological remains, making it difficult to interpret how and where it was used in female clothing. In all regions, garments were primarily made out of wool and linen, with some examples of silk and hemp.

== Regional variation ==
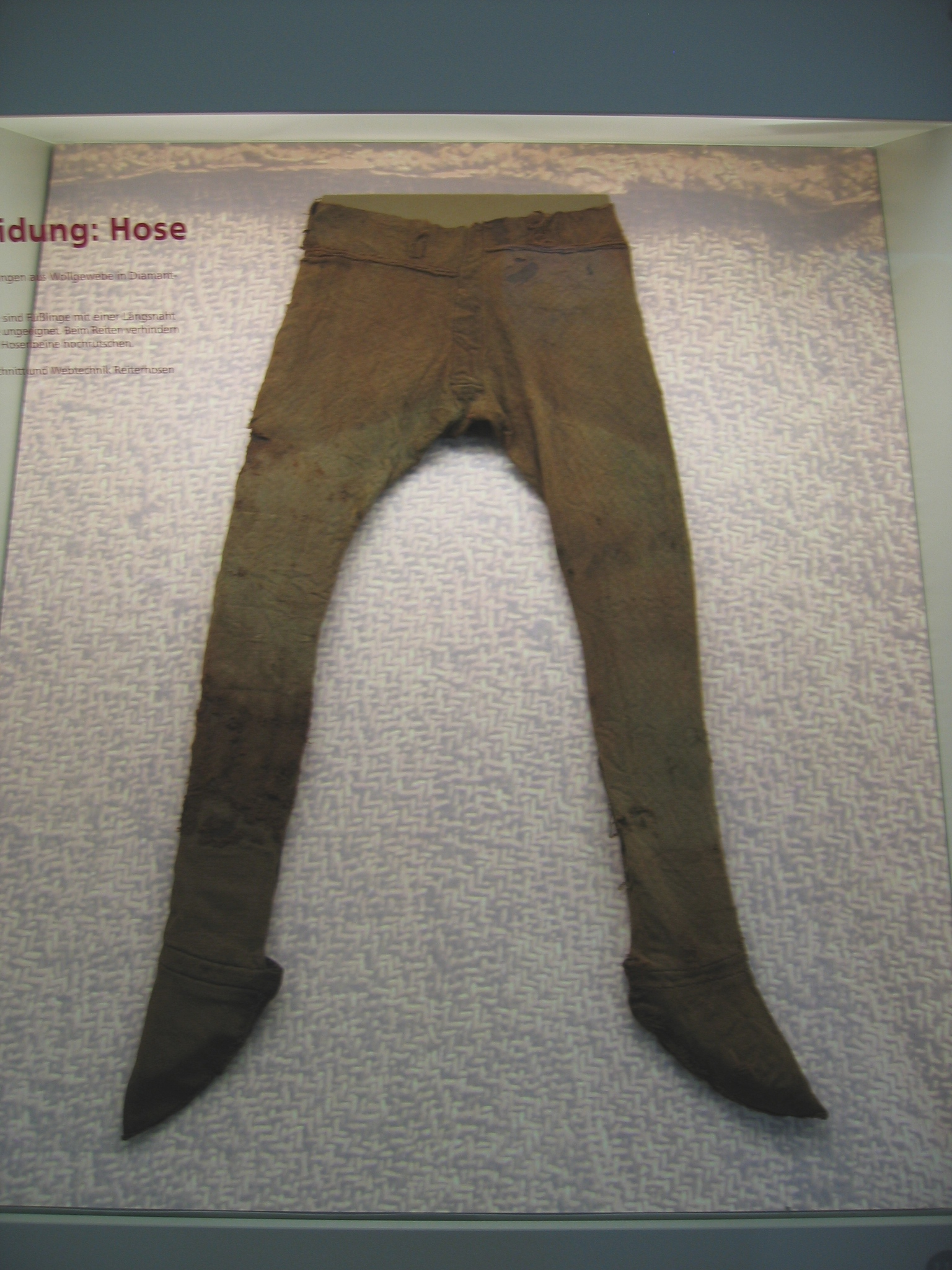
Barbarian trousers, from Thorsberg moor, a bog in Northern Germany, carbon-dated to the 4th century, though in terms of style they could come from any point in the following thousand years.

Areas where Roman influence remained strong include most of Italy except the North, South-Western France, as far north as Tours, and probably cities like Cologne in Germany. Iberia was largely ruled by the Moors in the later part of the period, and in any case had received rather different influences from the Visigoths compared to other invading peoples; Spanish dress remained distinctive well after the end of the period. The Visigothic Kingdom of Toulouse also ruled the South and West of France for the first two centuries of the period.

Early Anglo-Saxon women seem to have had a distinctive form of tubular dress, fastened on the shoulder with brooches, and belted. This style matches some German dresses from much earlier in the Roman period. After about 700, which roughly coincides with the general conversion to Christianity, they adopted the general Continental style.

The pagan Vikings, especially the women, dressed rather differently from most of Europe, with uncovered female hair, and an outer frock made of a single length of cloth, pinned with brooches at both shoulders. Under this they wore a sleeved undergarment, perhaps with an intervening wool tunic, especially in winter, when a jacket could be added as a final top layer.

== See also ==
- Anglo-Saxon dress
- Anglo-Saxon brooches
- Early Middle Ages
- Byzantine dress
- Byzantine silk
- Gaelic clothing and fashion
- English medieval clothing
- History of Western fashion
