= Hangaroc =

Apron-like garment worn by Norse women

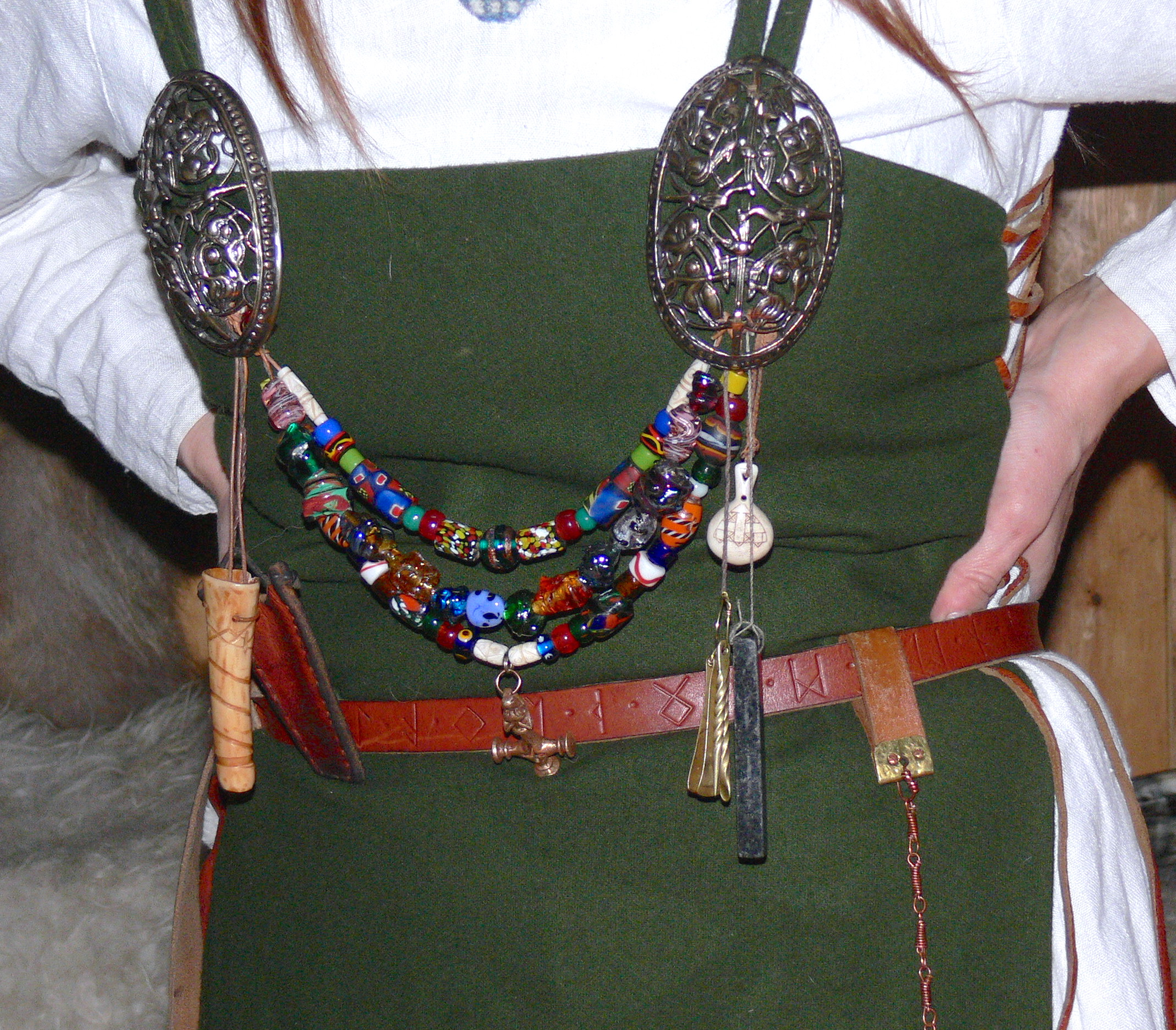
A modern replica of a hangaroc

A hangaroc (sometimes spelled hangerock or hangerok) was an apron-like outer garment worn by women of Norse origins and some other northern European cultures in the 8th, 9th and 10th centuries. In its usual form the hangaroc comprised a woollen or linen tailored tube wrapped around the body under the armpits and suspended by a pair of cloth straps that ran over the shoulders, secured by brooches. It hung down to mid-calf. The garment was shaped somewhat like a pinafore, and would usually be worn over a tunic-dress called a særk or a kirtle (underdress).

Hangarocs were usually secured by a pair of oval brooches, called "tortoise brooches", which are diagnostic of women's graves from the period. Wealthier women would wear their hangaroc decorated with braided wool or embroidery.

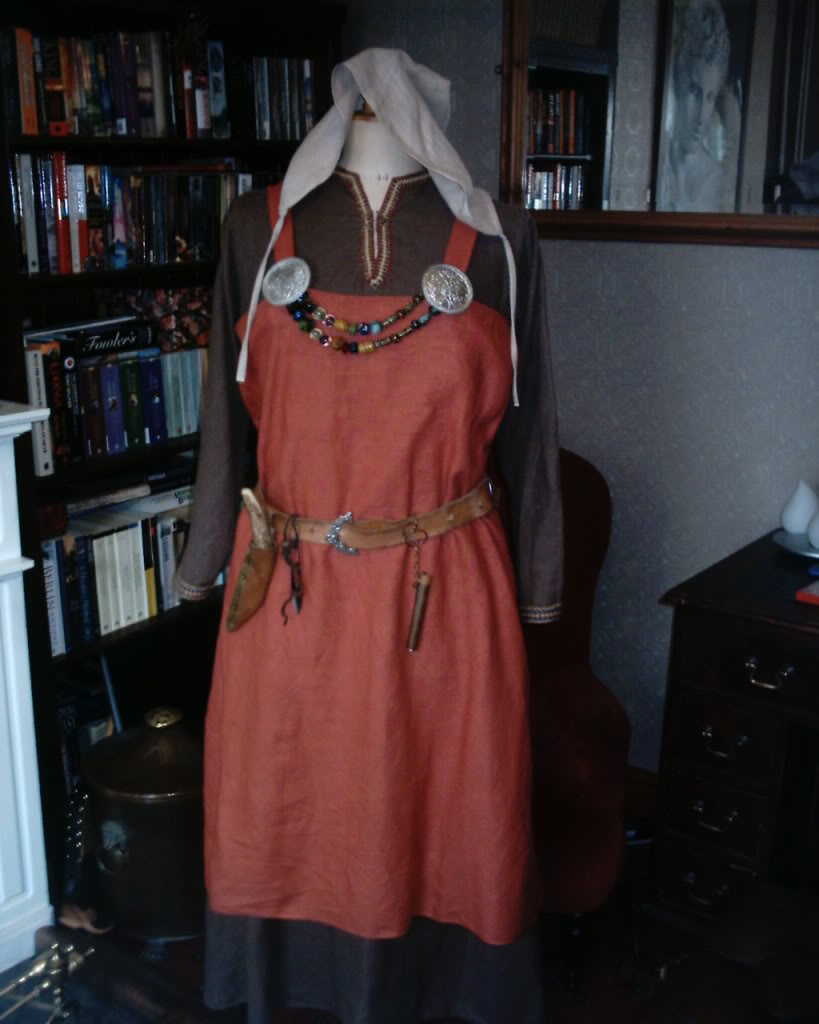
The red item shown is a hangerok.

== Etymology ==
The word originates from German or Germanic Hängerock. Rock means skirt or (historically) dress in German, while hänger refers to the hanging of items from the brooches.

== See also ==
- Sarafan
