= Bliaut =

Overgown, usually with wide trailing sleeves

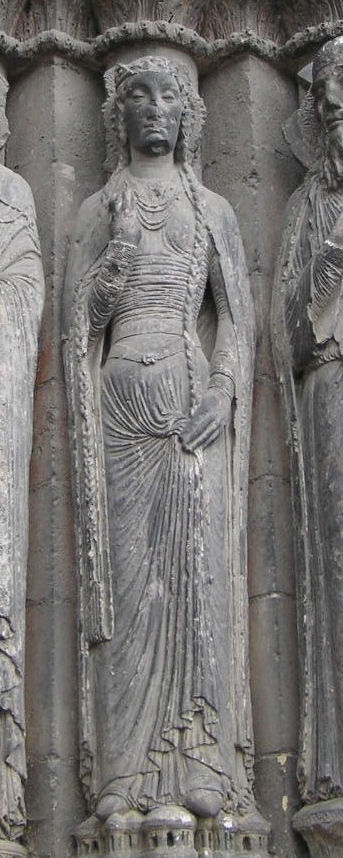
Woman wearing a one-piece bliaut and cloak or mantle, c. 1200, west door of Angers Cathedral.

The bliaut or bliaud is an overgarment that was worn by both sexes from the eleventh to the thirteenth century in Western Europe, featuring voluminous skirts and horizontal puckering or pleating across a snugly fitted under bust abdomen. The sleeves are the most immediately notable difference when comparing the bliaut to other female outer clothing of the Middle Ages. They fit closely from the shoulder to approximately the elbow, and then widen from the elbow to drape to floor- or nearly floor-length. This garment's usage appears to be geographically limited to areas of French influence, with some works depicting the garment or the garment in transition as far away as Rome and modern Germany.

== Evolution of the bliaut ==
=== Women's bliaut ===
Examples of this garment and its evolution appear as early as the Bayeux Tapestry, wherein a female figure wears a garment which is loose in the body, but has the extended sleeve that would be an identifying characteristic of the style after its transition. Paintings and illuminated items that depict the item as well include a miniature called Ladder of Virtue dated to the twelfth century and the work of Claricia, a nun and illuminator who appears to be wearing one in her small self-portrait in a South German Psalter dated c. 1200, currently in the Walters Art Museum in Baltimore.

Earlier depictions of bliauts appear to be cut in one piece, such as an example at Angers Cathedral, which is cinched at the natural waistline. The statue at Angers also shows visible lacing at the sides. Later examples of statuary such as the jambs of the Cathedral of Chartres west façade portals show the full accomplishment of the bliaut on female saints and patrons, such as the "Lady With Embroidered Hem," appearing on the left, beside the left portal. These later bliauts, usually shown on statues carved between the 1130s and 1160s, are termed the bliaut girone, and unlike their predecessors, were cut in two pieces. The bliaut girone consisted of a fitted bodice (cors) and skirt (girone), which was pleated into a low waistband and fell down in vertical folds. It was often paired with a girdle, or ceinture, which was wrapped around the stomach, emphasising the womb.

The bliaut girone was frequently worn at court and can be seen on the seals of Eleanor of Aquitaine, Marie of France, Countess of Champagne and Agnes de Champagne. Lanval, an 1160s poem by Marie de France, makes reference to 'tightly laced dresses of dark purple'.

=== Men's bliaut ===
The men's bliaut was more loosely fitted than the women's, and was cut in one piece with a flared skirt. Gores were inserted into the skirt to produce vertical folds.

== Materials ==
The fabrics available in this time would have been limited to woolens, linens, and silks. A fine wool or silk seems to be the best option, as linen is rather more difficult to dye a permanent color, and colored depictions of this item show a great deal of color.

== Construction ==
The historic costuming community remains divided over the method by which the abdominal folds are achieved. Theories range from cut to lacing to fabric manipulation methods.

1. Patterning an extended torso from underbust to waist or just above the hip, which when worn would achieve a number of wrinkles in the area.
2. Patterning for a tight abdomen. A garment sewn to fit tightly across the abdomen creates horizontal wrinkles due to tension.
3. Cutting a rather narrow abdomen and lacing the sides of the garment to create tensioned horizontal wrinkling.
4. What is modernly termed lattice or "honeycomb" smocking, which is a form of gathered fabric manipulation executed on the underside/interior.
5. Narrow pleats created by the plissé technique–gathering fabric with stitches, wetting the fabric, and "setting" the pleats by allowing the wet fabric to dry under weight or tension–were found on linen chemises or smocks in the 10th century Viking graves in Birka.

The achievement of skirt volume is also debated, ranging from a hipline seam with attached wide skirt to the addition of gores/godets to expand the hemline.

== Gallery ==
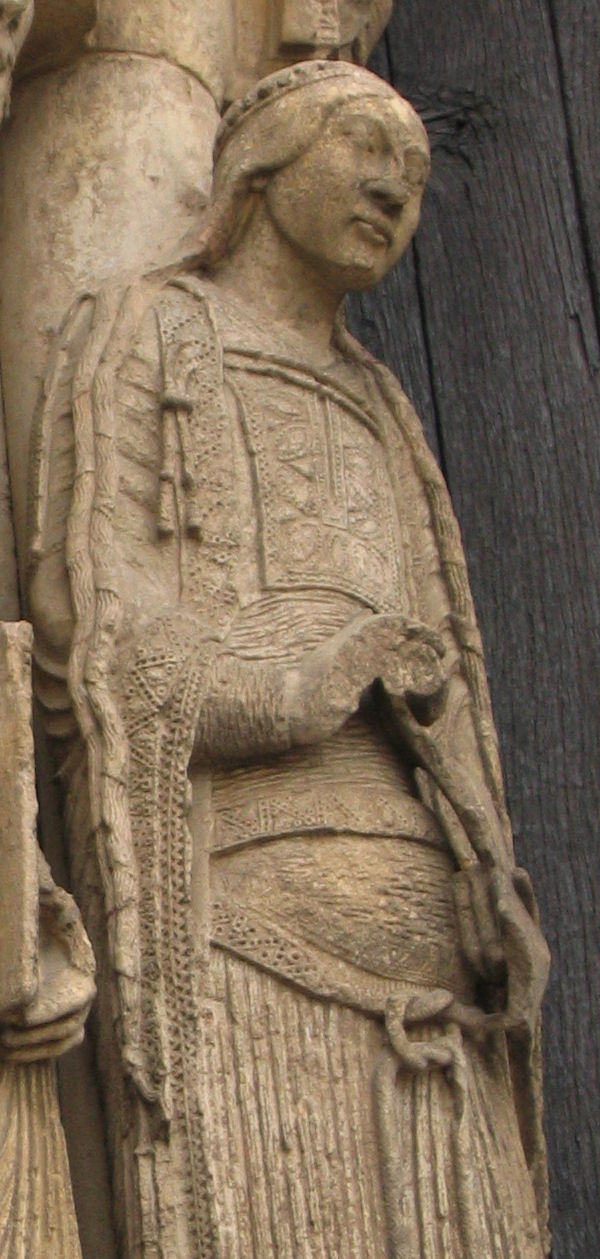
One of the statues at Chartres Cathedral in a bliaut girone, 1130-1160

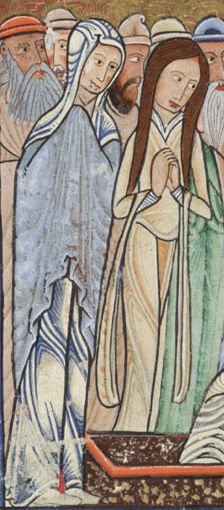
Two women from the Hunterian Psalter, c. 1170

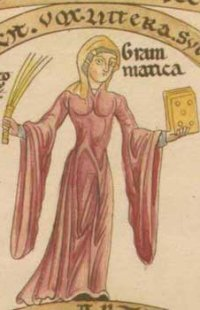
Grammatica wears a bliaut in the Hortus deliciarum, c. 1180

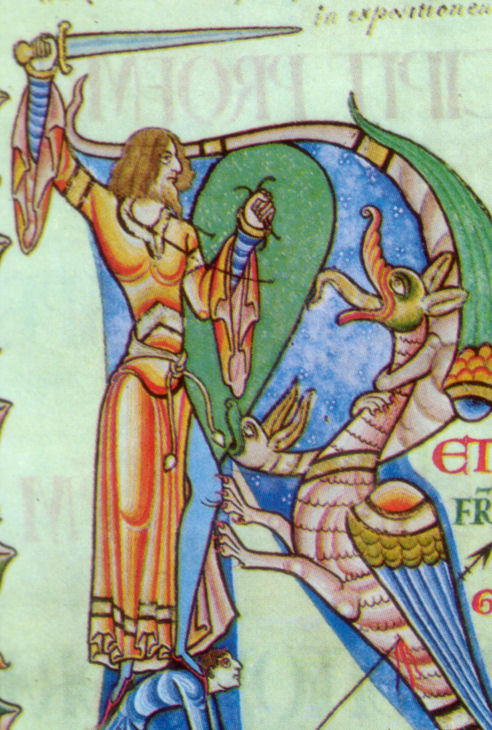
An example of a male bliaut from the 12th century manuscript Moralia in Job

== The bliaut in Victorian art ==
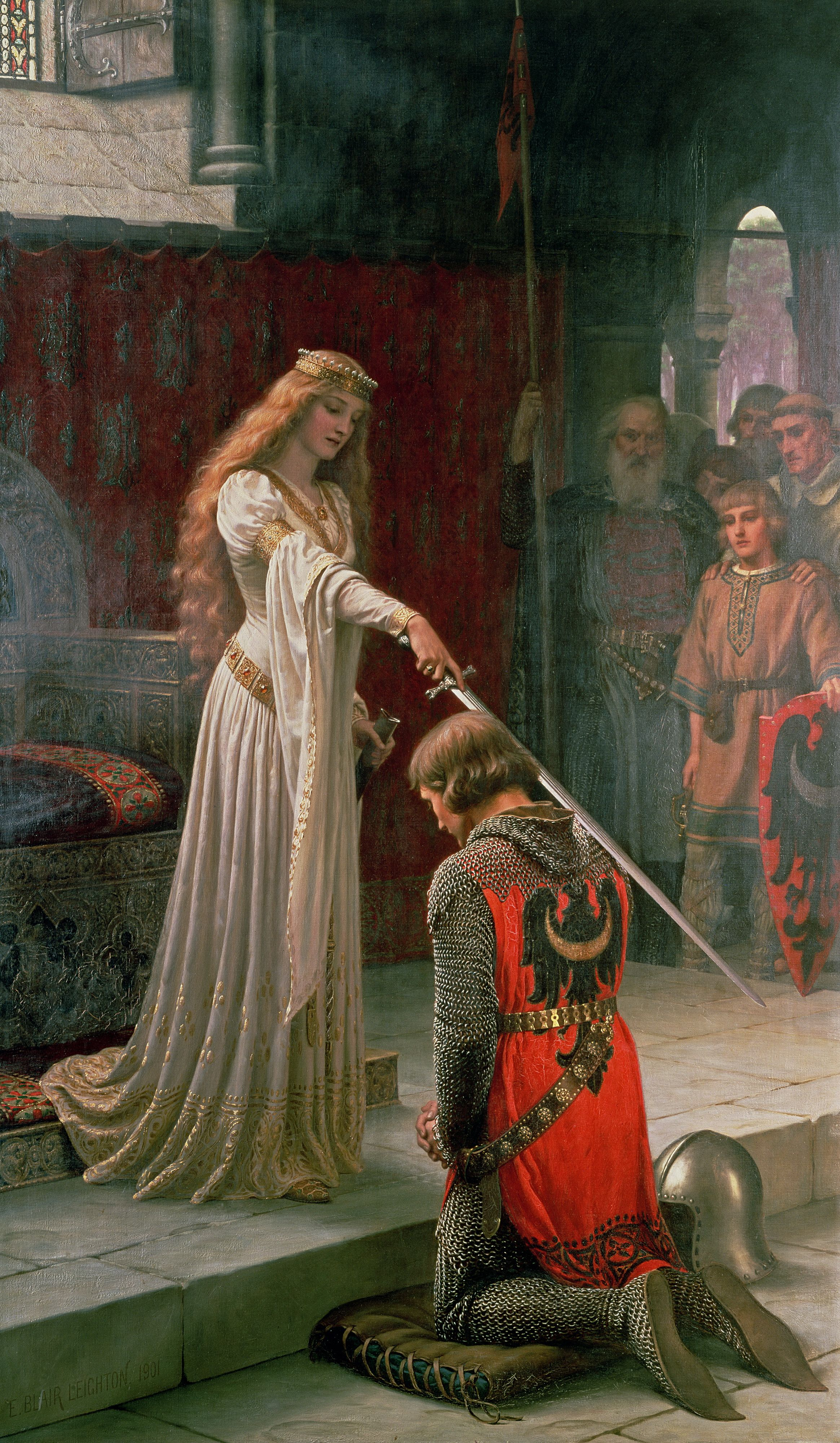
Victorian notion of a bliaut: The Accolade by Edmund Blair Leighton.

The Pre-Raphaelite Brotherhood became interested in the ideals and clothing of the Middle Ages and Renaissance. As a result, the bliaut as then understood is frequently featured upon women in their works. The most popular example of this particular garment in Pre-Raphaelite art may be The Accolade by Edmund Blair Leighton.
