= Hunterian Psalter =

12th-century illuminated manuscript

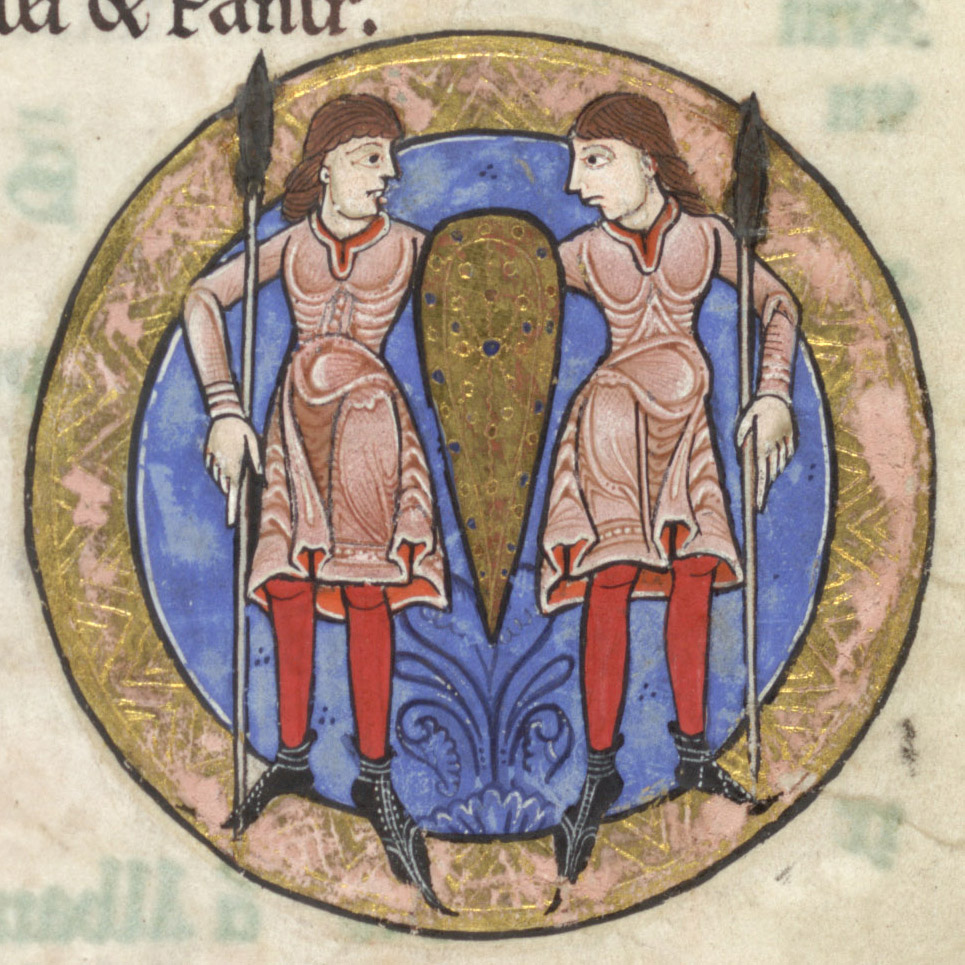
"Gemini", folio 3r, detail from the Hunterian Psalter.

The Hunterian Psalter (or York Psalter) is an illuminated manuscript of the 12th century. It was produced in England some time around 1170, and is considered a striking example of Romanesque book art. The work is part of the collection of the Glasgow University Library, cataloged as Sp Coll MS Hunter U.3.2 (229), which acquired the book in 1807. It derives its colloquial name, the "Hunterian Psalter", from having been part of the collection of 18th century Scottish anatomist and book collector William Hunter, who willed his collection to the University. It has also at times been known as the "York Psalter", owing to its supposed northern English origin in the city of York.

== Text ==
The original text of the Hunterian Psalter, all written in the same hand, consists of the 150 psalms from Jerome's Versio Gallicana revision of the Vulgate Bible, Biblical canticles and liturgical texts, and numerous illustrations, over more than two hundred pages of heavy vellum. One leaf is missing, probably removed for its illuminated initial.

The final thirteen folios contain later additions to the text, prayers likely from the late 13th century. These prayers were written for a female reader, but the singular feminine Latin endings were first overwritten with singular masculine endings, and then still later, plural masculine ones. There is also a formula for an amulet intended to cure epilepsy dating from the same century.

== Illustrations ==
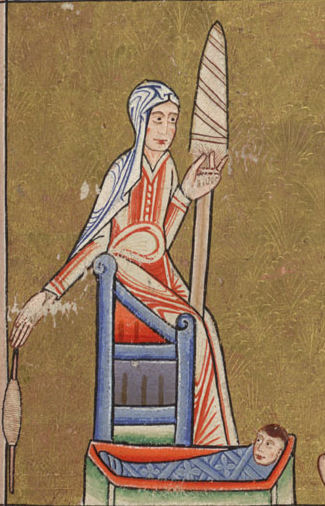
Eve spinning, showing the incised gold leaf background; the patterns are different on each page

The book opens with an illustrated calendar, each month beginning with the historiated letters "KL", an abbreviation for kalenda, i.e. the first day of the month. Then follow thirteen pages of prefatory full-page miniatures, two scenes to a page, with three pages of Old Testament scenes, six of scenes from the Life of Christ (further pages are perhaps missing), and, unusually for this date, three from the Life of the Virgin, including a Death of the Virgin, with a funeral procession, and an Assumption. These are the earliest English miniatures to have gold leaf backgrounds incised with patterns of lines and dots. After these pages there is an opening with full-page miniatures of David playing his harp and a Beatus initial for the start of Psalm 1 ("Beatus vir"). All the psalms have a large illuminated initial, often historiated, and each verse starts with an enlarged gold initial. The start of the ten traditional divisions of the text have especially large initials, as is usually the case.

Many of the illustrations and historiated initials seem to have been truncated at the top, perhaps the result of the book having been poorly re-bound at some time. Another theory is that the tops of the pages simply bear holes from where cloth curtains were once stitched. The book was re-bound again in 1983.

The manuscript's illustrations are notable for their several departures from scripture, for example in the panel depicting the sacrifice of Isaac by Abraham, Isaac's hands are depicted as unbound. In Genesis 22:9, it is written, "...He bound his son Isaac, and laid him on the altar, on top of the wood."

== Provenance ==
It is uncertain where or when, exactly, the manuscript was produced, or for whom. It has been suggested that it was produced for Roger de Mowbray (d. 1188), a prominent 12th century crusader and religious benefactor known to have founded a number of Augustinian and Cistercian monasteries and nunneries. The book also contains three commemorations to Augustine of Hippo, which has led some scholars to conclude that the manuscript might have been created for a house of Augustinian Canons, or by someone with a connection to the Augustinian order.

The fact that there is no mention of the 29 December feast of Thomas Becket on the page for December is thought to indicate that the book was produced before Becket's canonization in 1173. For most of its history, it was thought to have been the product of a scriptorium in the north of England, owing to its inclusion of a number of northern saints such as Oswald of Northumbria and John of Beverley (who very seldom occur outside northern manuscripts), although modern scholarly consensus puts its likely origin in the southwest of England.

There is no definite consensus about the number of artists who worked on the book. It has been suggested that a single master oversaw the work of several assistants, and it has also been put forth that it is the work of an artist working alone, copying and adapting templates from other illuminated manuscripts. It is thought to have been the work of skilled tradesmen, not monks.
