= Cyclas =

Cyclas may refer to:

- Cyclas (garment), a garment worn in Europe during the Middle Age
- Cyclas (beetle), a genus of true weevils
- Cyclas, a synonym for Crudia, a genus of plants
- Cyclas, a synonym for Sphaerium, a genus of freshwater clams
