= 1200–1300 in European fashion =

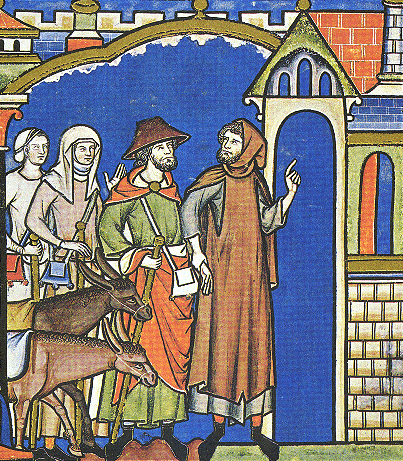
13th century clothing featured long, belted tunics with various styles of surcoats or mantle in various styles. The man on the right wears a gardecorps, and the one on the left a cloak and a simple hat. Women wore linen headdresses or wimples and veils, c. 1250

Costume during the thirteenth century in Europe was relatively simple in its shapes, rich in colour for both men and women, and quite uniform across the Roman Catholic world as the Gothic style started its spread all over Europe in dress, architecture, and other arts.

Male and female clothing became remarkably similar, with many men's garments differing substantially from women's dress only in hem length, with the fanned sleeves common in the previous century vanishing from the latter and tightly buttoned sleeves becoming common. While most items of clothing, especially outside the wealthier classes, remained by comparison little changed from three or four centuries earlier, the more tightly shaped cuts that had been introduced in the preceding century continued to evolve in commoners' fashion too, with the imitation of nobles' clothing beginning among the developing burgher class that would become prominent in following centuries.

The century saw great progress in the dyeing and working of wool, which was by far the most important material for outerwear. For the rich and fashionable, vibrant colour and rare fabrics such as silk from the silkworm were ubiquitous. Silk started to be produced in Europe in greater quantity than before, with silk embroidery seeing notable developments away from the style of Chinese silk that had been imported earlier; these would continue into unique European styles of silkwork in the 14th century.

The most common dyes remained shades of red, notably carmine, and basic yellows and greens. A lapis lazuli-dyed, intense blue became very fashionable, being adopted by the Kings of France as their heraldic colour.

== Men's clothing ==
Men wore a tunic, cote, or cotte with a surcoat over a linen shirt. One of these surcoats was the cyclas, which began as a rectangular piece of cloth with a hole in it for the head. Over time the sides were sewn together to make a long, sleeveless tunic. When sleeves and sometimes a hood were added, the cyclas became a garnache (a cap-sleeved surcoat, usually shown with hood of matching color) or a gardecorps (a long, generous-sleeved traveling robe, somewhat resembling a modern academic robe). A mantle was worn as a formal wrap. Men also wore hose, shoes, and headdress. The clothing of royalty was set apart by its rich fabric and luxurious furs. Hair and beard were moderate in length, and men generally wore their hair in a "pageboy" style, curling under at neck length. Shoes were slightly pointed, and embroidered for royalty and higher clergy.

=== Working men's clothing ===
Working men wore a short coat, or tunic, with a belt. It was slit up the center of the front so that they could tuck the corners into their belt to create more freedom of movement. They wore long braies or leggings with legs of varying length, often visible as they worked with their cotte tucked into their belt. Hose could be worn over this, attached to the drawstring or belt at the waist. Hats included a round cap with a slight brim, the beret (just like modern French ones, complete with a little tab at the top), the coif (a little tight white hood with strings that tied under the chin), the straw hat (in widespread use among farmworkers), and the chaperon, then still a hood that came round the neck and over the shoulders. Apart from aprons for trades like smithing, and crude clothes tied round the neck to hold seed for sowing, special clothes were not worn for working.

=== Style gallery ===
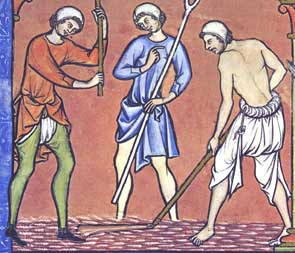
1 – Work clothes

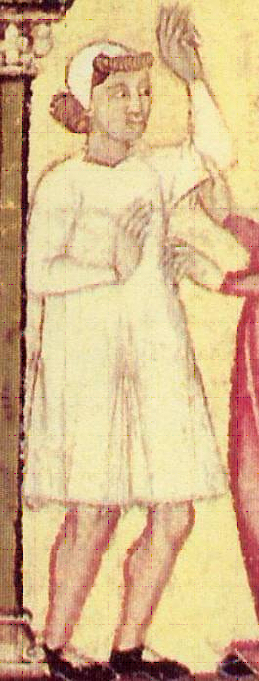
2 – Shirt

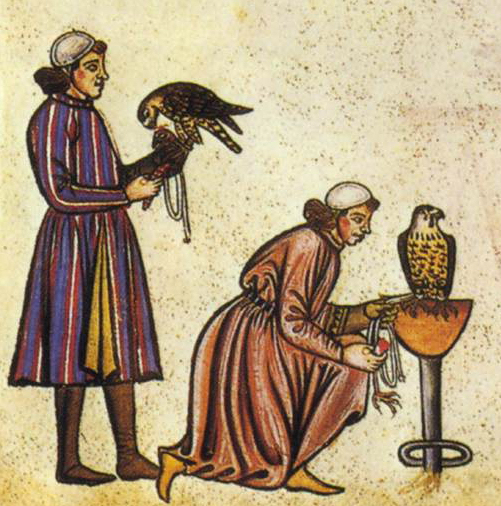
3 - Tunics

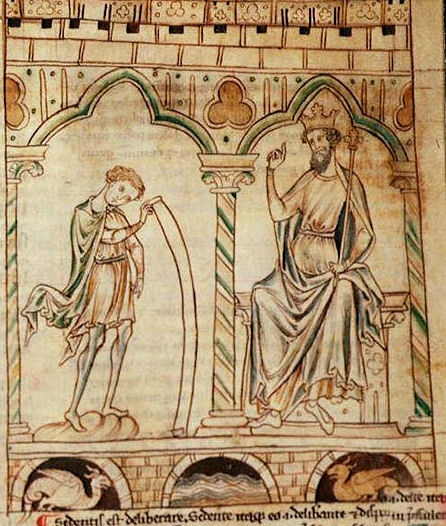
4 – Tunics and mantles

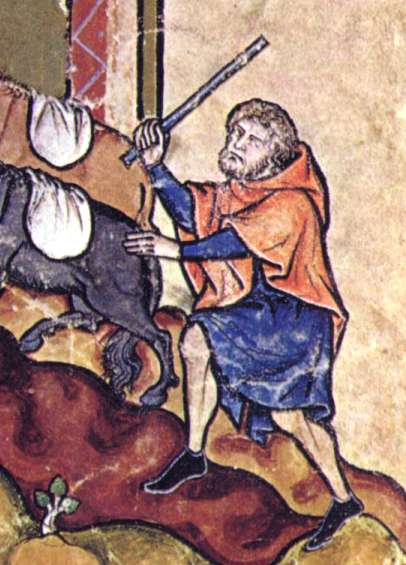
5 – Cappa or chaperon

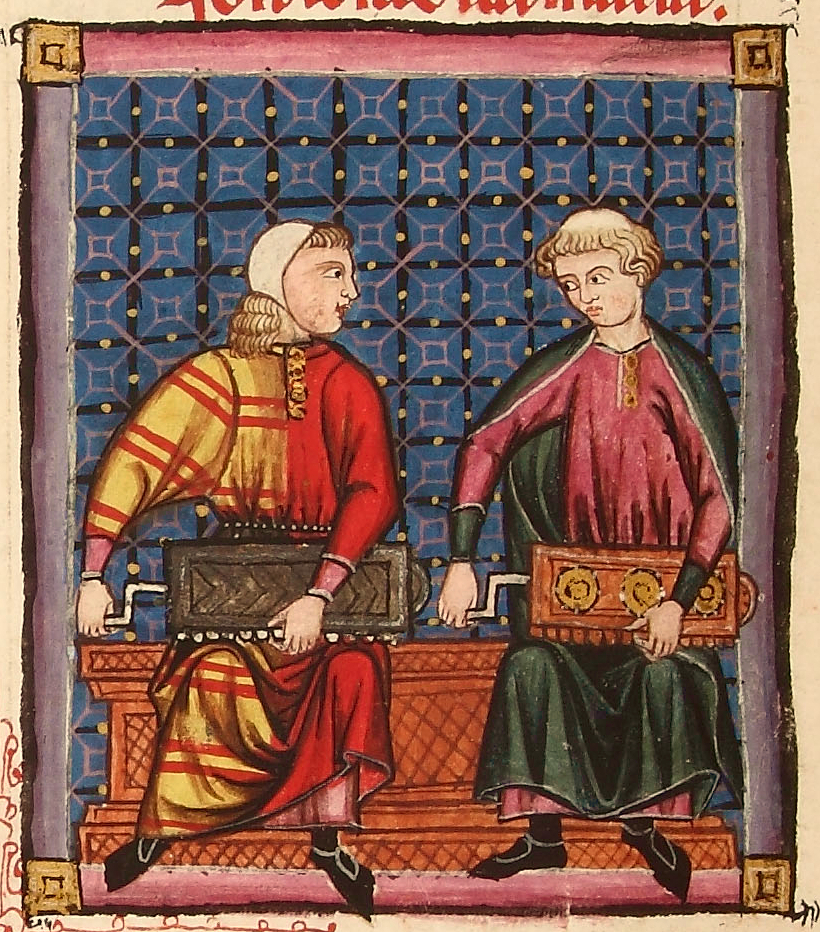
6 - Tunics

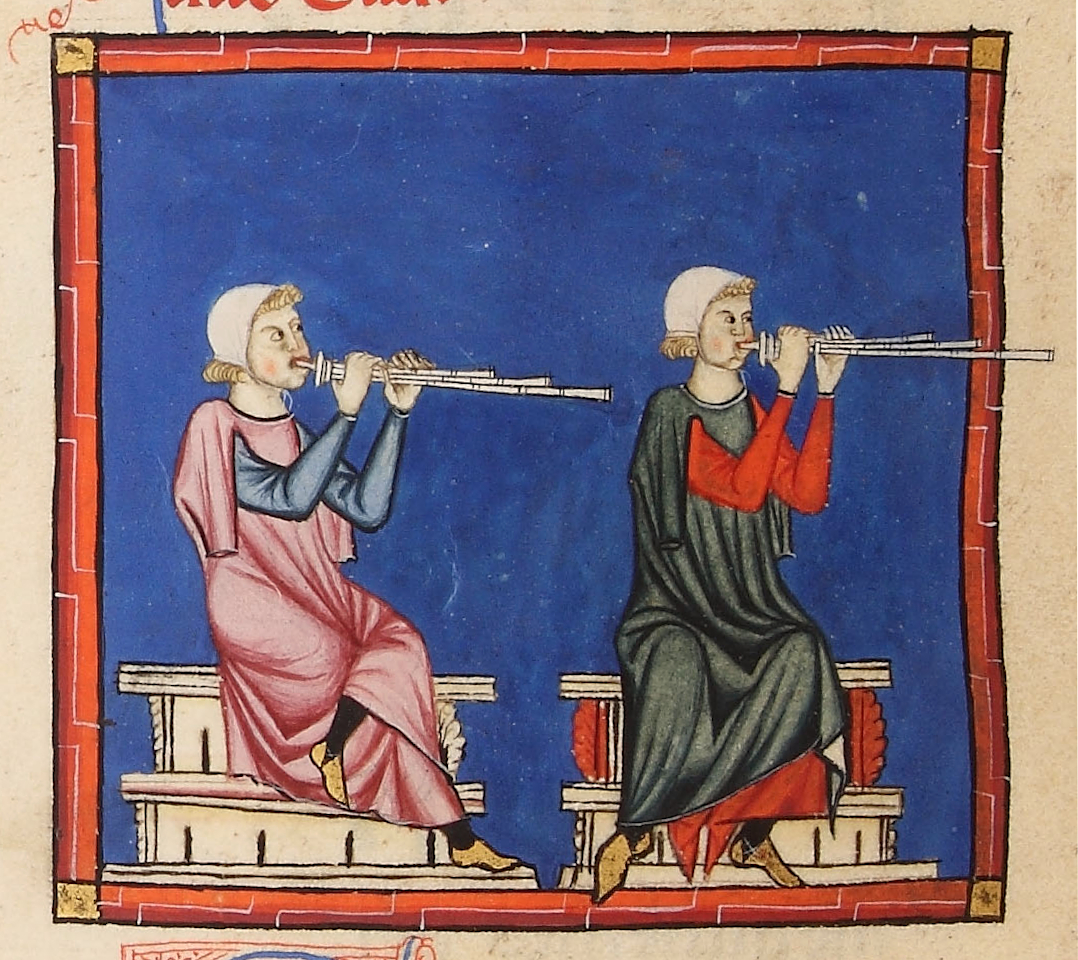
7 - Tunics with hanging sleeves

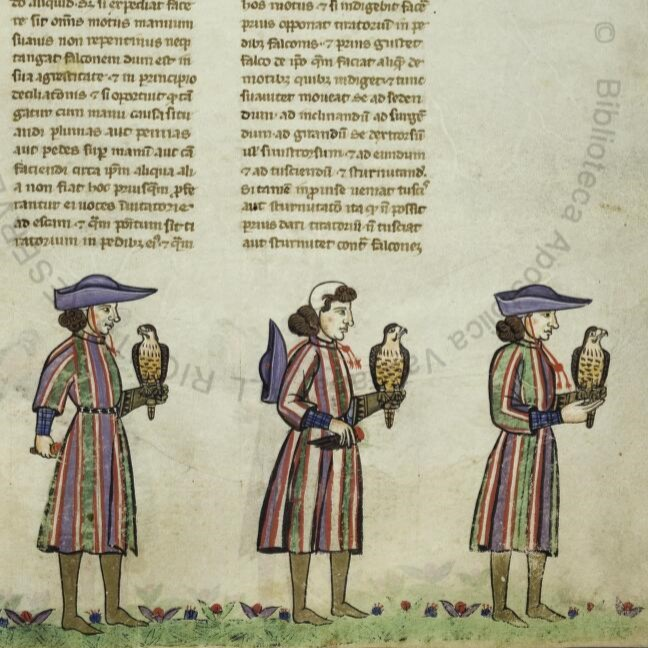
8 - Falconers wearing bycocket caps
1. Men working in linen braies, tunics, and coifs, from the Maciejowski Bible, c. 1250. The man on the left wears green hose over his braies.
2. Man in a coif and shirt (camisa) with gussets at the hem, from the Cantigas de Santa Maria, Spain, mid-13th century.
3. Falconers wear belted tunics and coifs, 1240s.
4. Young Merlin wears a short tunic with a rectangular cloak or mantle and hose. King Vortigern wears a mantle draped over both shoulders over a long robe or tunic and shoes with straps at the instep. From a manuscript of Geoffrey of Monmouth's Prophetia Merlini, c. 1250–70.
5. Man in the short, hooded cape called a cappa or chaperon, c. 1250–70.
6. Musicians wear two long tunics, one over the other. The tunic on the left is an early example of mi-parti or particolored clothing, made from two fabrics. Cantigas de Santa Maria, mid-13th century, Spain.
7. Pan-pipe players wear tunics with hanging sleeves over long-sleeved undertunics. Both wear coifs. Cantigas de Santa Maria, mid-13th century, Spain.

== Women's clothing ==
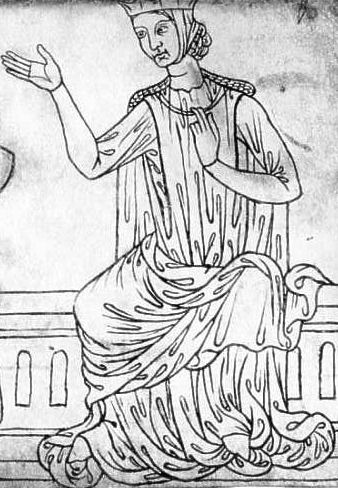
Woman in a barbette and coif, sleeveless surcoat, gown and mantle. Sketch by Villard de Honnecourt, c.1230

=== Overview ===
Dress for women was more loosely fit compared to the previous century and somewhat more modest, the era from about 1220 onward having notably been characterised as the 'elegant period' in Gothic dress according to Ortwin Gamber.

A narrow belt was uniform, which could be richly decorated with metal plating in various colours such as blue and green. Over it was worn the cyclas or sleeveless surcoat also worn by men. More wealthy women wore more embroidery and their mantle, held in place by a cord across the chest, might be lined with luxurious fur. Women, like men, wore hose and leather shoes which, regardless of gender, could be elaborately embroidered for special occasions.

=== Headdresses and hairstyles ===
Individuality in women's costume was notably expressed through their hair and headdress. One distinctive feature of women's headwear was the barbette, a chin band to which a hat or various other headdresses might be attached. This hat might be a "woman's coif", which often resembled a pillbox hat, in plain or fluted versions. The hair might be confined by a net called a crespine or crespinette, visible only at the back. Later in the century the barbette and coif were reduced to narrow strips of cloth, and the entire hairdress might be covered with the crespine, the hair fashionably bulky over the ears. Coifs and barbettes were white, while the crespine might be colored or gold. The wimple and veil of the 12th century still seen on nuns today continued to be worn, mainly by older women and widows. Women also wore long tunics that went down to their ankles. This was worn over a shirt.

=== Wealthier women's jewelry ===
Wealthy women often wore clothes lined with fur. They wore jewelry and jewels such to make them look wealthy. Rings and brooches were made of gold and silver, inset with uncut precious and semi-precious stones. Gold was reserved for the upper class.

=== Style gallery ===
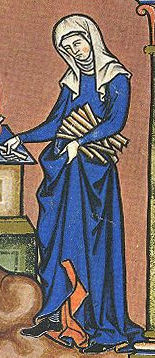
1 – From the Morgan Bible, c. 1250: the wife of Manoah wears a veil and wimple. Note striped hose.

== Footwear ==
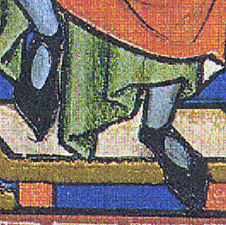
Shoes with an ankle strap and open instep, c. 1250

Shoes began to develop a pointed toe at this time however, they were much more restrained than they were in the 14th century. The usual shoe, worn by men and women alike, opened at the front, from the instep to the toe. Boots were largely only worn by men. Commoners also wore stockings with leather sewn to the sole, and wooden clogs. Woollen garters were also worn by commoners.

== Emerging trends ==
The Lübeckian chronicler Arnold mocked changes in Danish attire he attributes to the increasing economic power of the Danes:

The Danes, who imitate the habits of the Germans ... are now adopting the dress and weapons of other nations. Previously, they dressed like seamen because they lived by the coast and were always preoccupied with ships, but now they clothe themselves not only in scarlet, parti-coloured and grey furs, but also in purple and fine linens. The reason for this is that they have all become very rich due to the fishing that takes place every year around Scania. ... They catch the herring at no cost to themselves, by the abundant grace of God, while the merchants offer the best they have in order to secure a good bargain – and sometimes even lose their lives in shipwrecks.

Historians conjecture that the raw materials used to make clothing changed along with the styles, from wool to linens, as well as the colors of the textiles, and the types of weave, from homespun grey woolens to imported red and darkly-colored textiles.

== Sumptuary laws ==
The Fourth Council of the Lateran of 1215 ruled that Jews and Muslims must be distinguishable by their dress, beginning the process that transformed the conical or pointed Jewish hat from something worn as a voluntary mark of difference to an enforced one. Previously it had been worn but had been regarded by European Jews as "an element of traditional garb, rather than an imposed discrimination". A law in Breslau (Wrocław) in 1267 said that since Jews had stopped wearing the pointed hats they used to wear, this would be made compulsory. The Yellow badge also dates from this century, although the hat seems to have been much more widely worn.

Sumptuary laws covering prostitutes were introduced (following Ancient Roman precedent) in the 13th century: in Marseille a striped cloak, in England a striped hood, and so on. Over time these tended to be reduced to distinctive bands of fabric attached to the arm or shoulder, or tassels on the arm.

These probably reflected both a growing concern for control over the increasing urban populations, and the increasing effectiveness of the Church's control over social issues across the continent.

== See also ==
- Early medieval European dress
- 1100–1200 in European fashion
- 1300–1400 in European fashion
- 1400–1500 in European fashion
