= Kirtle =

Garment worn in the medieval period

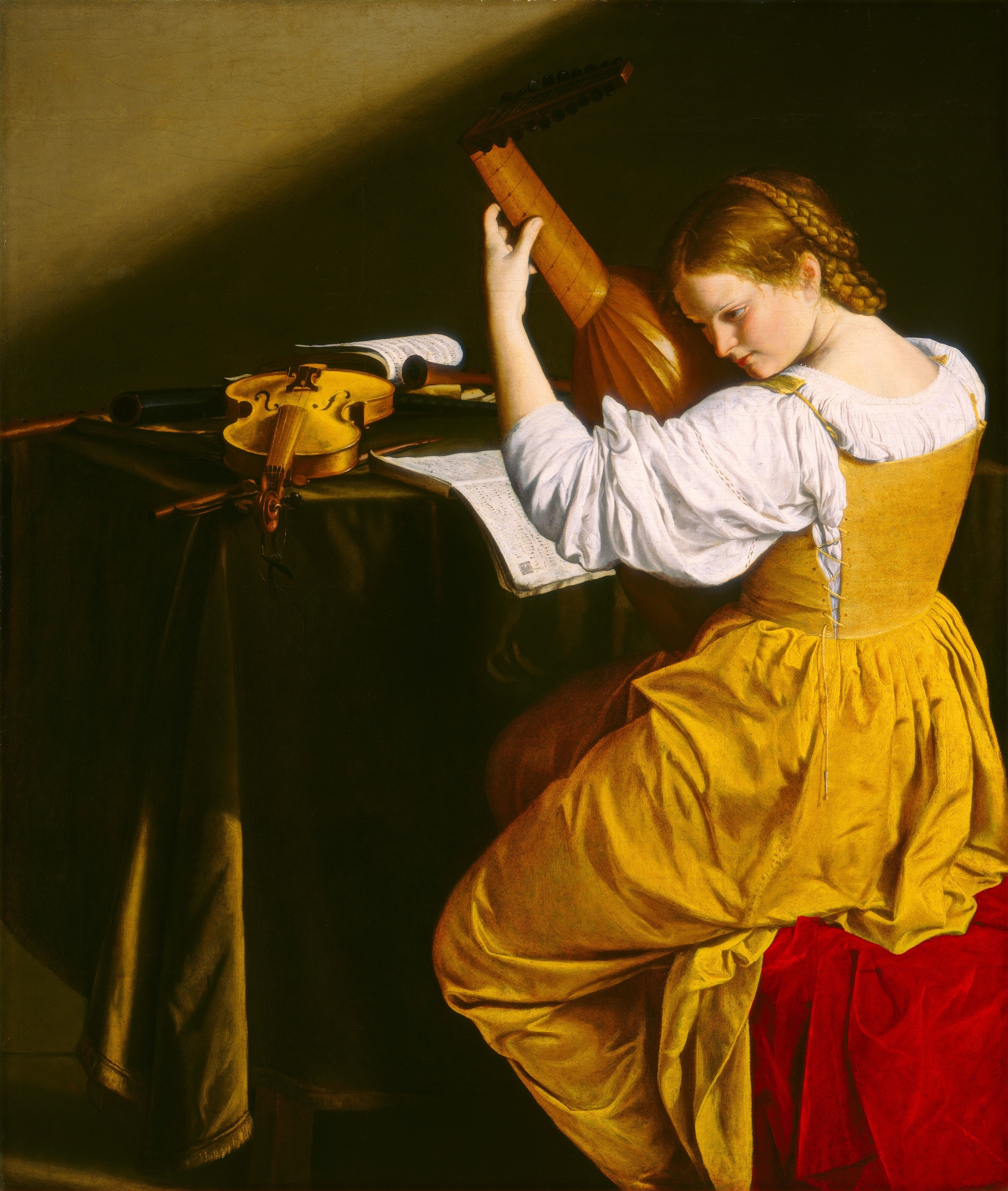
A lute player wears a yellow kirtle over her smock (1626).

A kirtle (sometimes called a cotte or a cotehardie) is a garment that was worn by men and women in the European Middle Ages. It eventually became a one-piece garment worn by women from the late Middle Ages into the Baroque period. The kirtle was typically worn over a chemise or smock, which acted as a slip, and under the formal outer garment, a gown or surcoat.

== History ==
Kirtles were part of fashionable attire into the middle of the 16th century, and remained part of country or middle-class clothing into the 17th century.

Kirtles began as loose garments without a waist seam, changing to tightly fitted supportive garments in the 14th century. Later, in the Renaissance, kirtles could be constructed by combining a fitted bodice with a skirt gathered or pleated into the waist seam. Kirtles could lace up the front, back or side-back, with some rare cases of side lacing, all dependent upon the fashion of the day and place and upon the type of gown worn over it. Kirtles could be embellished with a variety of decorations including gold, silk, tassels, and knobs.

== See also ==
- Chemise
- Girdle
- Dirndl
- Pinafore dress
