= Houppelande =

Medieval outer garment

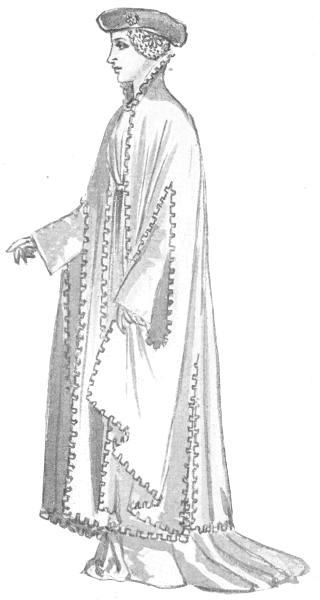
15th century costume - the Houppelande

A houppelande or houpelande is an outer garment, with a long, full body and flaring sleeves, that was worn by both men and women in Europe in the late Middle Ages. Sometimes the houppelande was lined with fur. The garment was later worn by professional classes, and has remained in Western civilization as the familiar academic and legal robes of today. However, back then it was always worn over a doublet by men.

The houppelande appeared around 1360 and was to remain fashionable well into the next century. It had its origins in the herigaut, a similar 13th-century garment with hanging sleeves. The edges of the houppelande were often dagged, or cut into decorative patterns such as scallops, "embattled" tabs or even leaf shapes.

== History ==
The term houppelande is of French origin; in England it was called a goun, a term of mockery, and in Italy, a pellanda. It is first mentioned in French royal inventories in 1359 and is thought to have originated as a man's housecoat worn over the pourpoint.

The woman's and man's houppelande were similar in that both featured flared sleeves, high collars and voluminous skirts. However, there were a few key differences. The man's houppelande was belted at the waist, whereas the woman's was belted beneath the bust. Unlike the woman's houppelande, which was always floor-length, the man's houppelande could be of any length. Some men wore houppelandes that extended only as far as the buttocks, prompting critics to claim that they looked like women from behind. Longer versions were mostly worn on ceremonial occasions. A mid-calf version known as the houppelande à mi-jambe gained popularity in the 1400s.

== Gallery ==
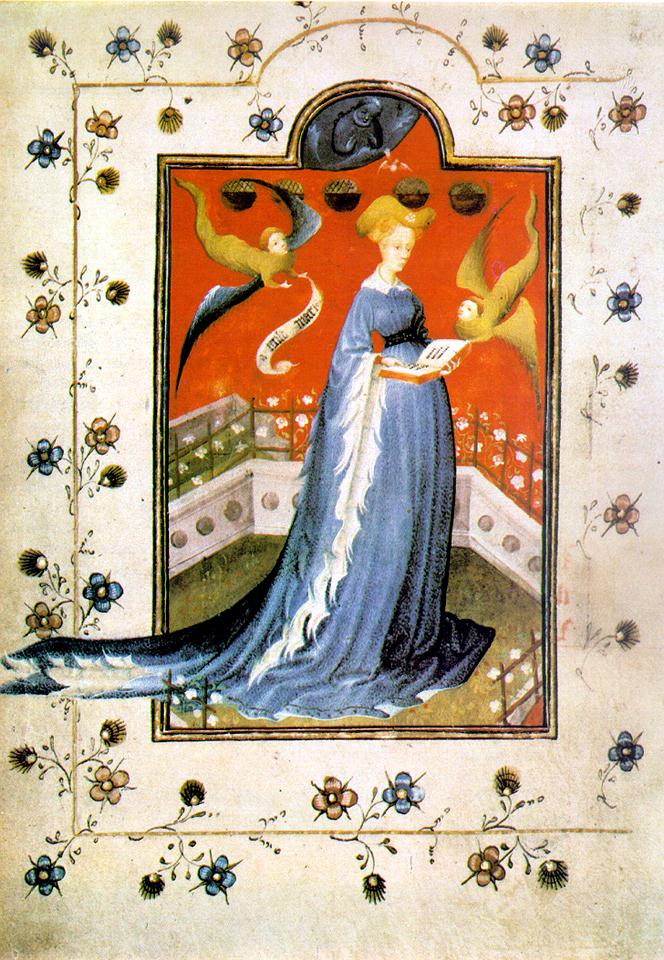
Woman wearing a houppelande with "dagged" sleeves.

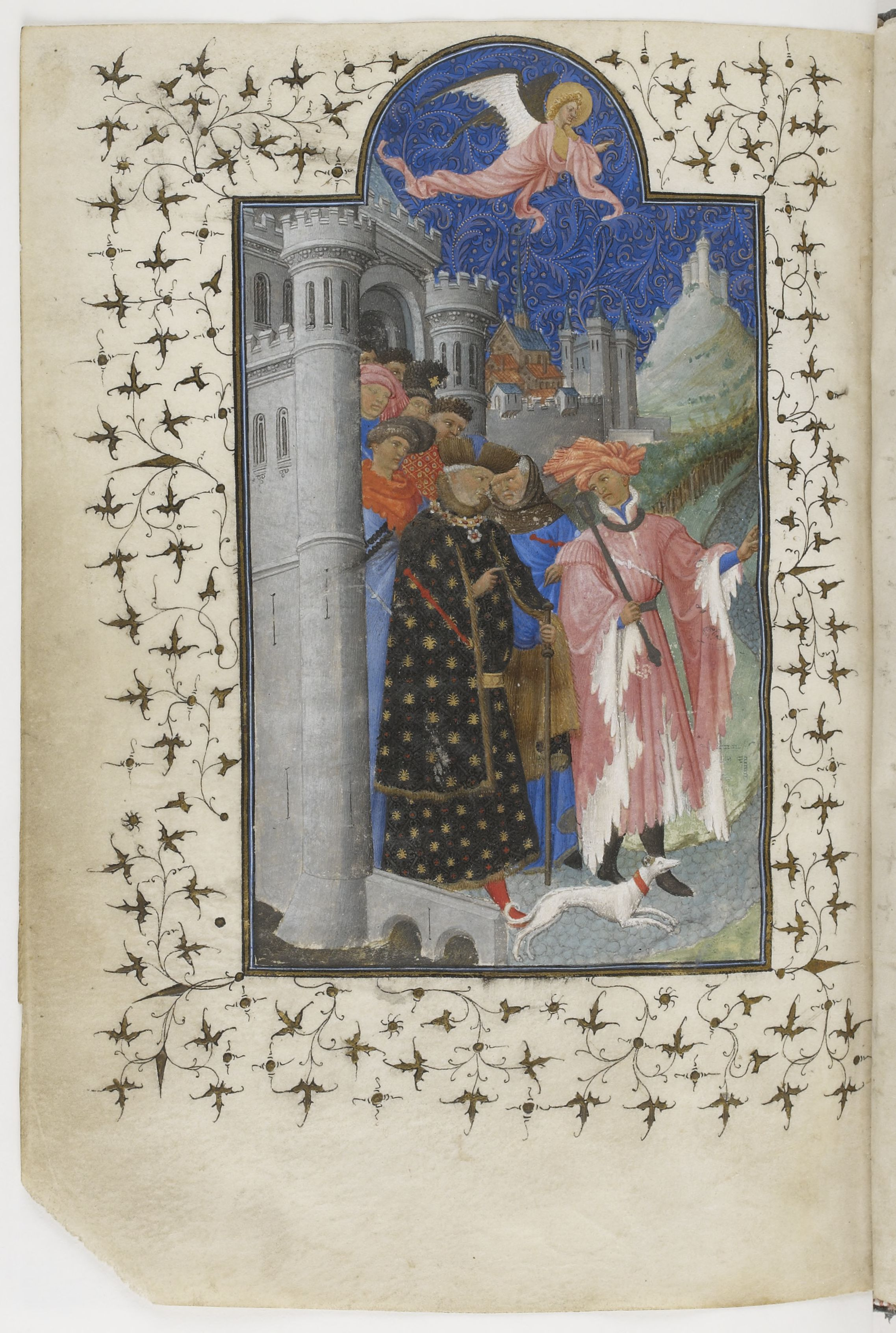
The man on the right wears a belted houppelande and a chaperon hat.

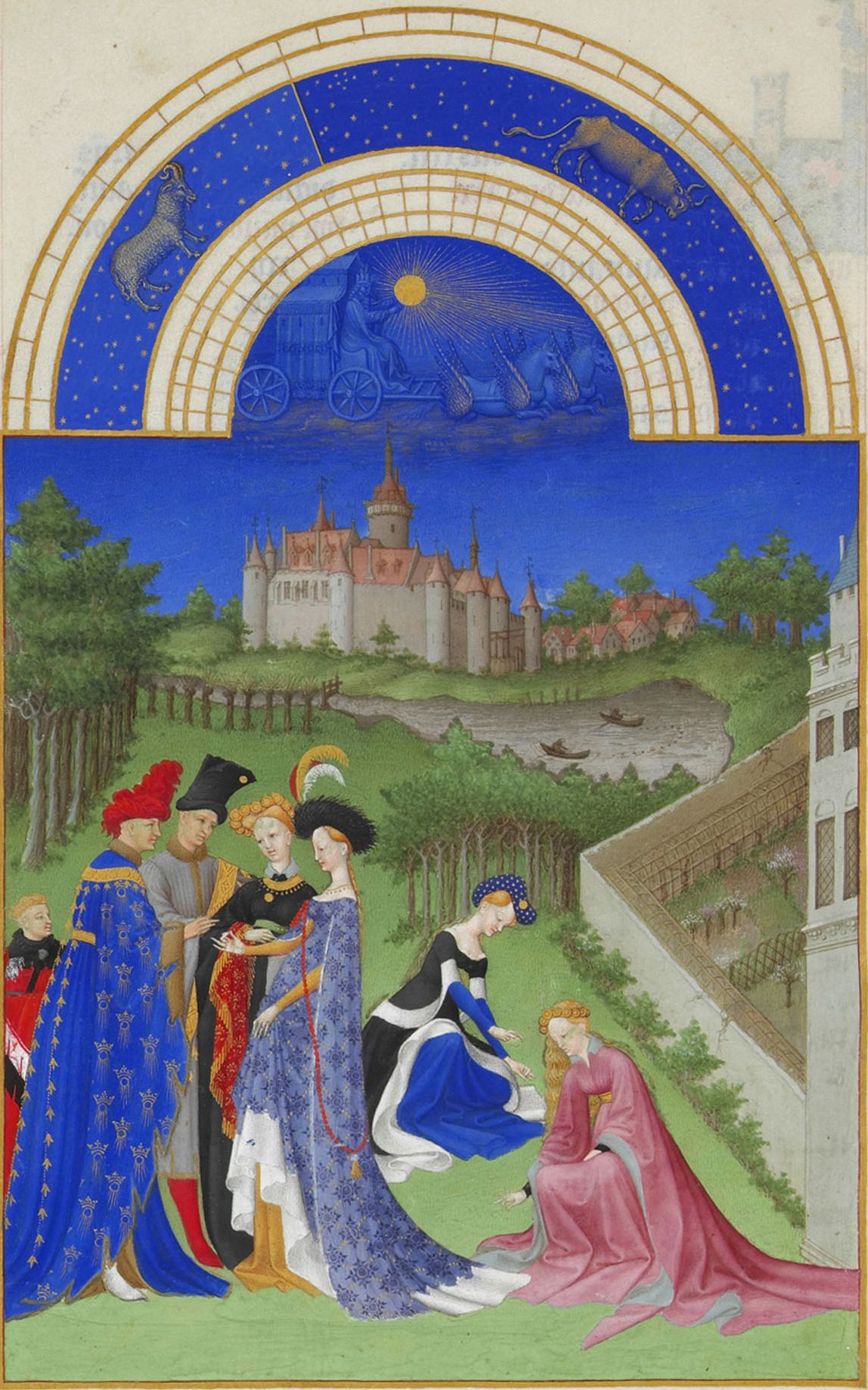
Houppelande examples from Très Riches Heures du Duc de Berry, avril

== See also ==
- 1300–1400 in European fashion
- 1400–1500 in European fashion
