= 1300–1400 in European fashion =

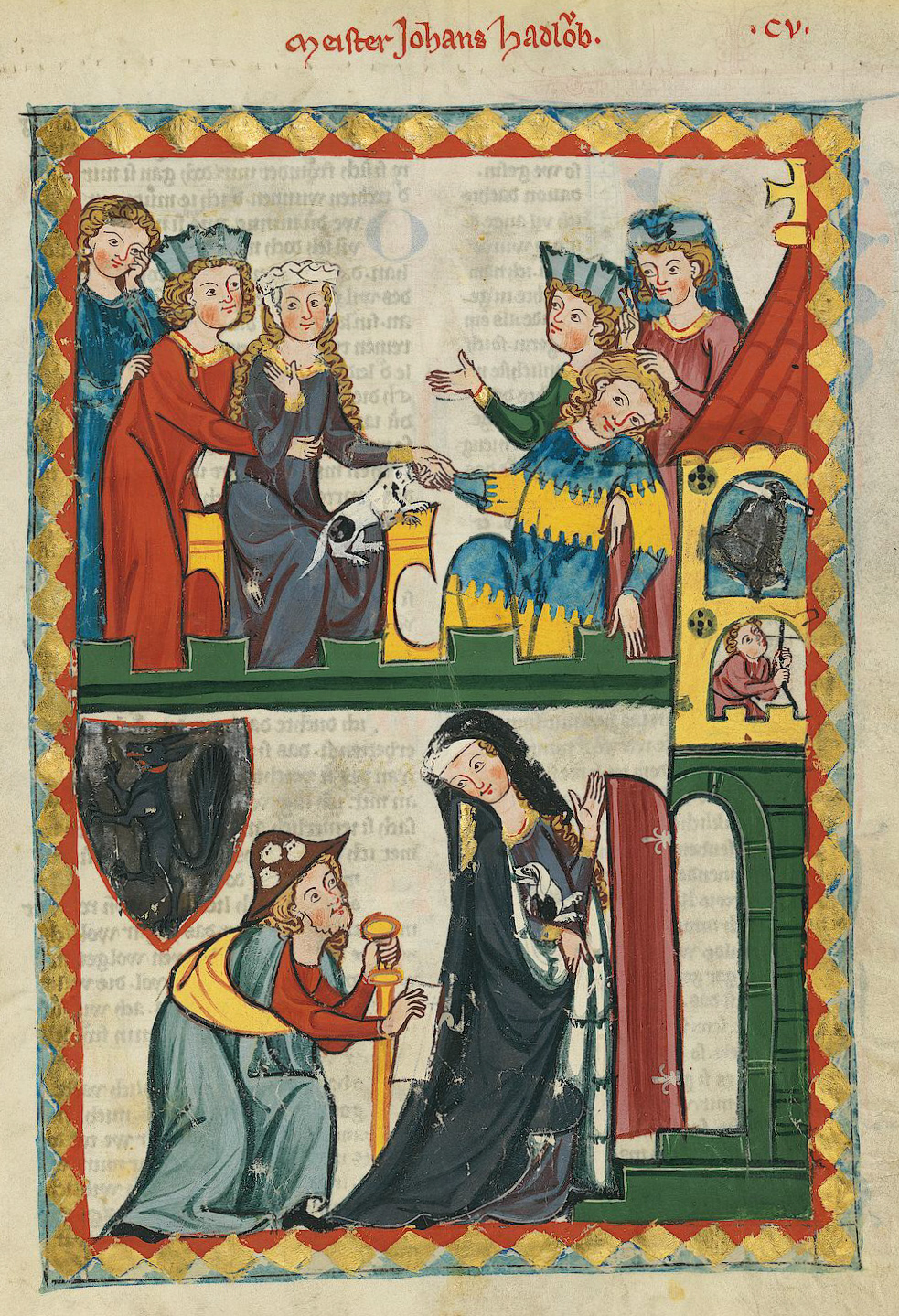
Clothing of the first half of the 14th century is depicted in the Codex Manesse. In the lower panel, the man is dressed as a pilgrim on the Way of St James with the requisite staff, scrip or shoulder bag, and cockle shells on his hat. The lady wears a blue cloak lined in vair, or squirrel, fur

Fashion in fourteenth-century Europe was marked by the beginning of a period of experimentation with different forms of clothing. Costume historian James Laver suggests that the mid-14th century marks the emergence of recognizable "fashion" in clothing, in which Fernand Braudel concurs. The draped garments and straight seams of previous centuries were replaced by curved seams and the beginnings of tailoring, which allowed clothing to more closely fit the human form. Also, the use of lacing and buttons allowed a more snug fit to clothing.

In the course of the century the length of male hemlines progressively reduced, and by the end of the century it was fashionable for men to omit the long loose over-garment of previous centuries (whether called tunic, kirtle, or other names) altogether, putting the emphasis on a tailored top that fell a little below the waist—a silhouette that is still reflected in men's costume today.

== Fabrics and furs ==
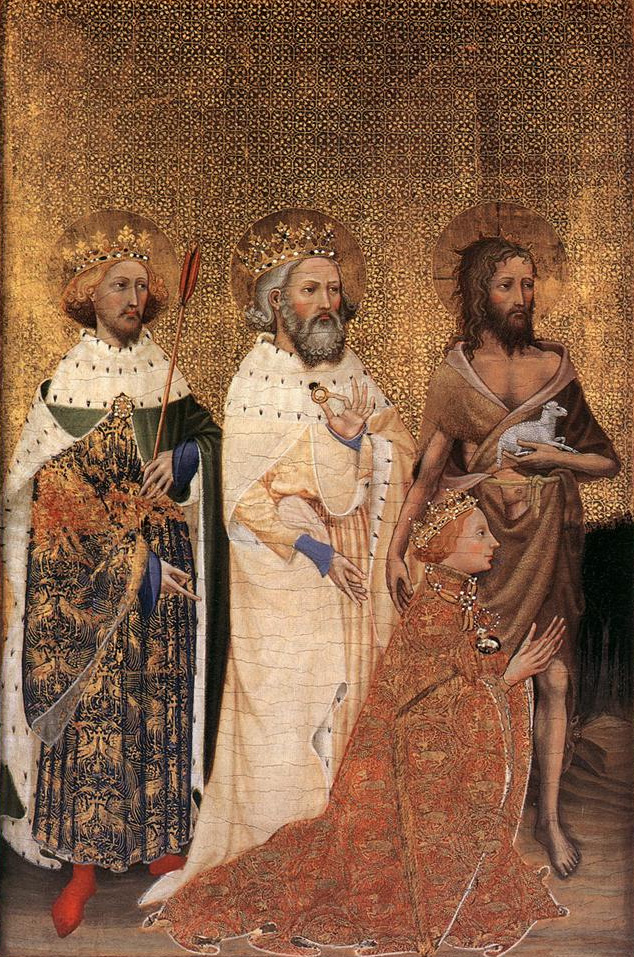
The young Richard II of England, kneeling, wears a houppelande of silk brocade with the badge of his livery. St John the Baptist wears his iconographical clothes, but the sainted English kings Edward the Confessor and Edmund the Martyr are in contemporary royal dress. The Wilton Diptych 1395–99

Wool was the most important material for clothing, due to its numerous favourable qualities, such as the ability to take dye and its good insulation. This century saw the beginnings of the Little Ice Age, and glazing was rare, even for the rich (most houses just had wooden shutters for the winter). Trade in textiles continued to grow throughout the century and formed an important part of the economy for many areas from England to Italy. Clothes were very expensive, and employees, even high-ranking officials, were usually supplied with, typically, one outfit per year, as part of their remuneration.

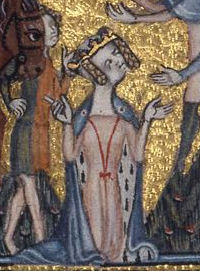
Mary de Bohun wears an ermine-lined mantle tied with red strings. Her servant wears a mi-parti tunic. From an English psalter, 1380–85

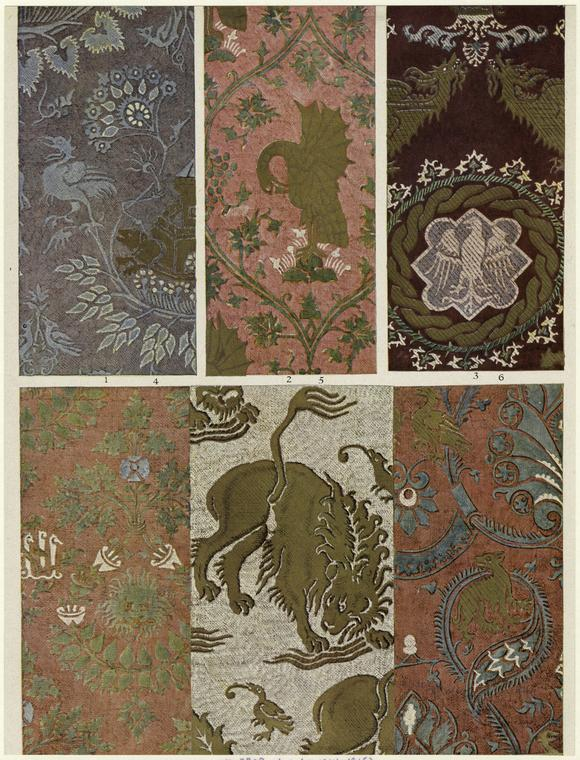
14th-century Italian silk damasks

Woodblock printing of cloth was known throughout the century, and was probably fairly common by the end; this is hard to assess as artists tended to avoid trying to depict patterned cloth due to the difficulty of doing so. Embroidery in wool, and silk or gold thread for the rich were used for decoration. Edward III established an embroidery workshop in the Tower of London, which presumably produced the robes he and his Queen wore in 1351 of red velvet "embroidered with clouds of silver and eagles of pearl and gold, under each alternate cloud an eagle of pearl, and under each of the other clouds a golden eagle, every eagle having in its beak a Garter with the motto hony soyt qui mal y pense embroidered thereon."

Silk was the finest fabric of all. In Northern Europe, silk was an imported and very expensive luxury. The well-off could afford woven brocades from Italy or even further afield. Fashionable Italian silks of this period featured repeating patterns of roundels and animals, deriving from Ottoman silk-weaving centres in Bursa, and ultimately from Yuan Dynasty China via the Silk Road.

A fashion for mi-parti or parti-coloured garments made of two contrasting fabrics, one on each side, arose for men in mid-century, and was especially popular at the English court. Sometimes just the hose would be different colours on each leg.

Checkered and plaid fabrics were occasionally seen; a parti-coloured cotehardie depicted on the St. Vincent altarpiece in Catalonia is reddish-brown on one side and plaid on the other, and remains of plaid and checkered wool fabrics dating to the 14th century have also been discovered in London.

Fur was mostly worn as an inner lining for warmth; inventories from Burgundian villages show that even there a fur-lined coat (rabbit, or the more expensive cat) was one of the most common garments. Vair, the fur of the squirrel, white on the belly and grey on the back, was particularly popular through most of the century and can be seen in many illuminated manuscript illustrations, where it is shown as a white and blue-grey softly striped or checkered pattern lining cloaks and other outer garments; the white belly fur with the merest edging of grey was called miniver. A fashion in men's clothing for the dark furs sable and marten arose around 1380, and squirrel fur was thereafter relegated to formal ceremonial wear. Ermine, with their dense white winter coats, was worn by royalty, with the black-tipped tails left on to contrast with the white for decorative effect, as in the Wilton Diptych above.

== Men's clothing ==
=== Shirt, doublet and hose ===
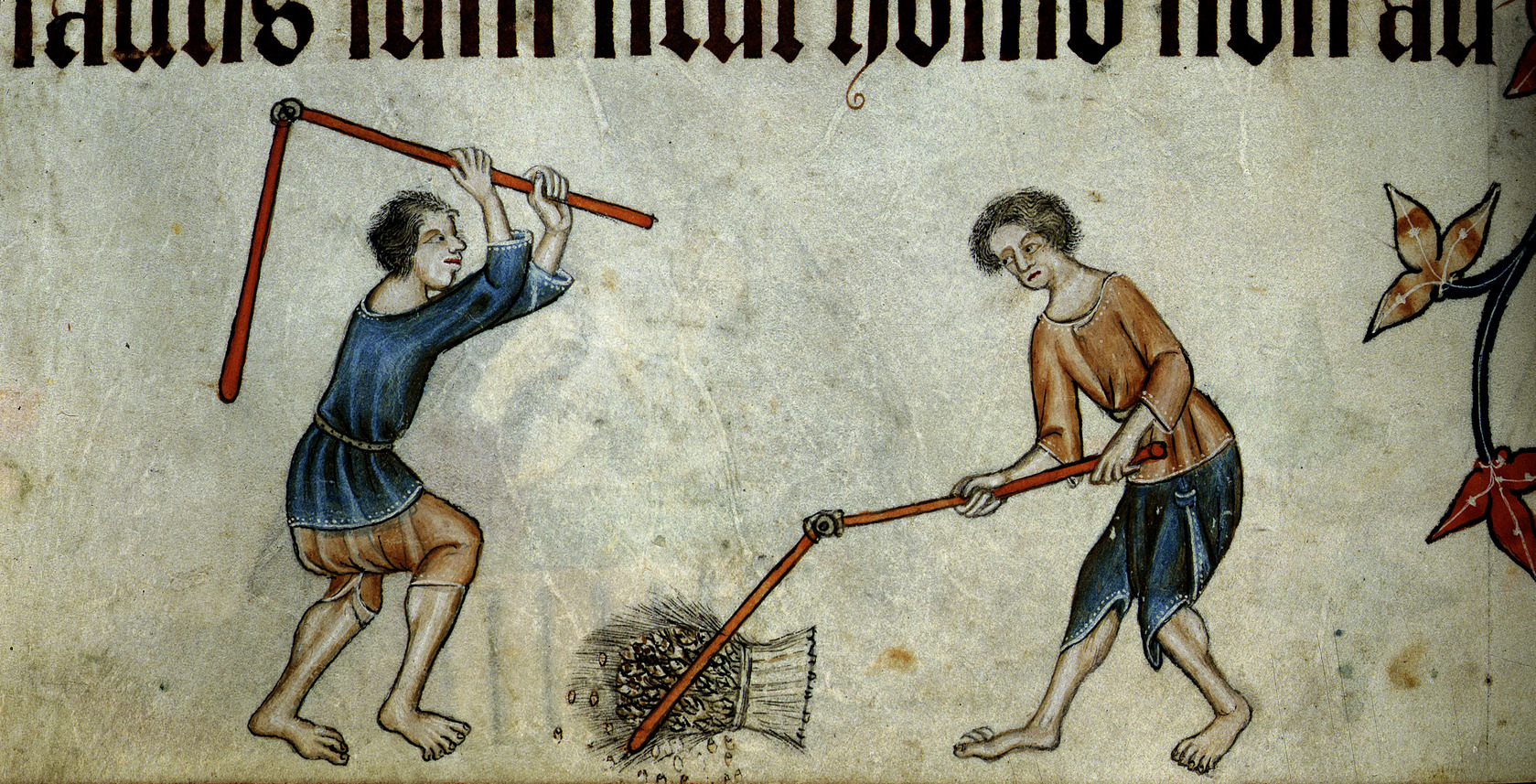
Two men threshing sheaf seen wearing braies, from the Luttrell Psalter (c.1325-1335)

The innermost layer of clothing were the braies or breeches, a loose undergarment, usually made of linen, which was held up by a belt. Next came the shirt, which was generally also made of linen, and which was considered an undergarment, like the breeches.

Hose or chausses made out of wool were used to cover the legs, and were generally brightly colored, and often had leather soles, so that they did not have to be worn with shoes. The shorter clothes of the second half of the century required these to be a single garment like modern tights, whereas otherwise they were two separate pieces covering the full length of each leg. Hose were generally tied to the breech belt, or to the breeches themselves, or to a doublet.

A doublet was a buttoned jacket that was generally of hip length. Similar garments were called cotehardie, pourpoint, jaqueta or jubón. These garments were worn over the shirt and the hose.

=== Tunic and cotehardie ===
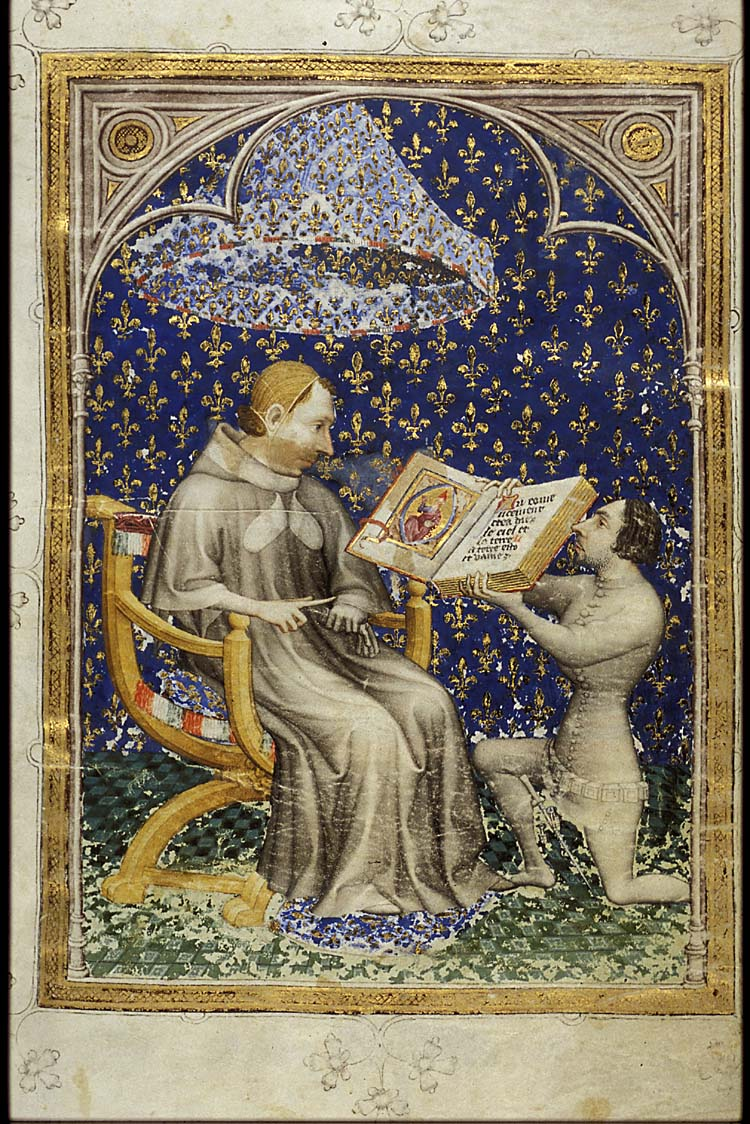
Jean de Vaudetar, chamberlain of King Charles V of France, presents his gift of a manuscript to the King, by Jean Bondol, 1372. For this very formal occasion, he is shown without anything over his tightly tailored top. The king wears a coif

A robe, tunic, or kirtle was usually worn over the shirt or doublet. As with other outer garments, it was generally made of wool. Over this, a man might also wear an over-kirtle, cloak, or a hood. Servants and working men wore their kirtles at various lengths, including as low as the knee or calf. However, the trend during the century was for hem-lengths to shorten for all classes.

However, in the second half of the century, courtiers are often shown, if they have the figure for it, wearing nothing over their closely tailored cotehardie. A French chronicle records: "Around that year (1350), men, in particular, noblemen and their squires, took to wearing tunics so short and tight that they revealed what modesty bids us hide. This was a most astonishing thing for the people". This fashion may well have derived from military clothing, where long loose robes were naturally not worn in action. At this period, the most dignified figures, like King Charles in the illustration, continue to wear long robes—although as the Royal Chamberlain, de Vaudetar was himself a person of very high rank. This abandonment of the robe to emphasize a tight top over the torso, with breeches or trousers below, was to become the distinctive feature of European men's fashion for centuries to come. Men had carried purses up to this time because tunics did not provide pockets.

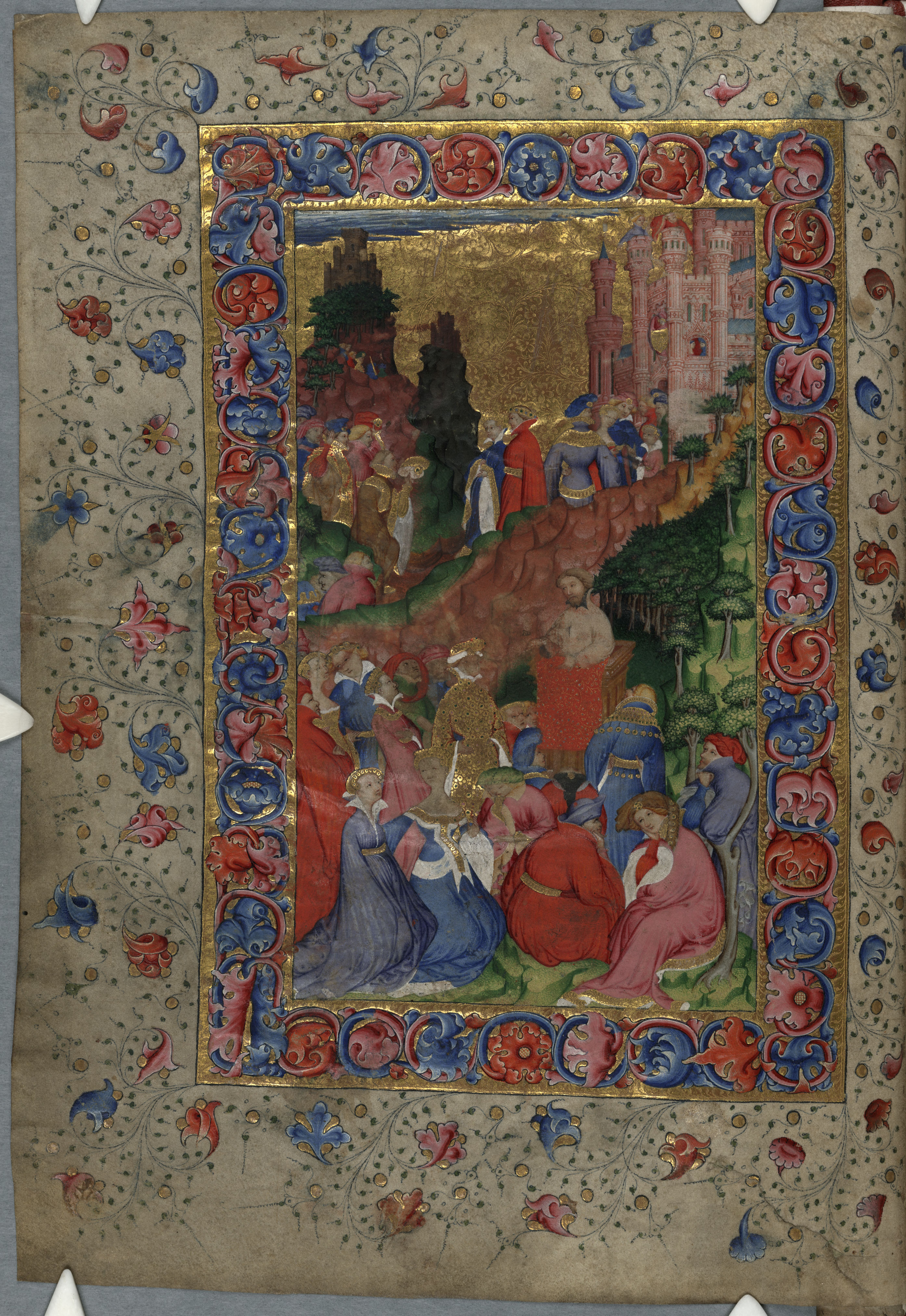
Geoffrey Chaucer reciting before nobles

The funeral effigy and "achievements" of Edward, the Black Prince in Canterbury Cathedral, who died in 1376, show the military version of the same outline. Over armour he is shown wearing a short fitted arming-coat or jupon or gipon, the original of which was hung above and still survives. This has the quartered arms of England and France, with a rather similar effect to a parti-coloured jacket. The "charges" (figures) of the arms are embroidered in gold on linen pieces, appliquéd onto coloured silk velvet fields. It is vertically quilted, with wool stuffing and a silk satin lining. This type of coat, originally worn out of sight under armour, was in fashion as an outer garment from about 1360 until early the next century. Only this and a child's version (Chartres Cathedral) survive. As an indication of the rapid spread of fashion between the courts of Europe, a manuscript chronicle illuminated in Hungary by 1360 shows very similar styles to Edward's English version.

Edward's son, King Richard II of England, led a court that, like many in Europe late in the century, was extremely refined and fashion-conscious. He himself is credited with having invented the handkerchief; "little pieces [of cloth] for the lord King to wipe and clean his nose," appear in the Household Rolls (accounts), which is the first documentation of their use. He distributed jeweled livery badges with his personal emblem of the white hart (deer) to his friends, like the one he himself wears in the Wilton Diptych (above). In the miniature (left) of Chaucer reading to his court both men and women wear very high collars and quantities of jewelry. The King (standing to the left of Chaucer; his face has been defaced) wears a patterned gold-coloured costume with matching hat. Most of the men wear chaperon hats, and the women have their hair elaborately dressed. Male courtiers enjoyed wearing fancy-dress for festivities; the disastrous Bal des Ardents in 1393 in Paris is the most famous example. Men, as well as women, wore decorated and jewelled clothes; for the entry of the Queen of France into Paris in 1389, the Duke of Burgundy wore a velvet doublet embroidered with forty sheep and forty swans, each with a pearl bell around its neck.

A new garment, the houppelande, appeared around 1380 and was to remain fashionable well into the next century. It was essentially a robe with fullness falling from the shoulders, very full trailing sleeves, and the high collar favored at the English court. The extravagance of the sleeves was criticized by moralists.

=== Headgear and accessories ===
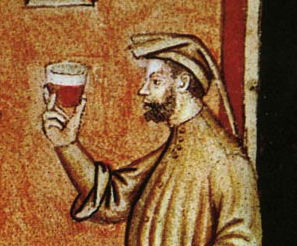
Man wearing a chaperon, Italy, late 14th century

During this century, the chaperon made a transformation from being a utilitarian hood with a small cape to becoming a complicated and fashionable hat worn by the wealthy in town settings. This came when they began to be worn with the opening for the face placed instead on the top of the head.

Belts were worn below waist at all times, and very low on the hips with the tightly fitted fashions of the latter half of the century. Belt pouches or purses were used, and long daggers, usually hanging diagonally to the front.

In armour, the century saw increases in the amount of plate armour worn, and by the end of the century the full suit had been developed, although mixtures of chain mail and plate remained more common. The visored bascinet helmet was a new development in this century. Ordinary soldiers were lucky to have a mail hauberk, and perhaps some cuir bouilli ("boiled leather") knee or shin pieces.

=== Style gallery ===
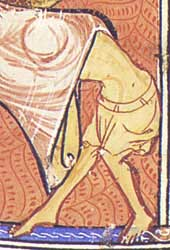
1 – Braies

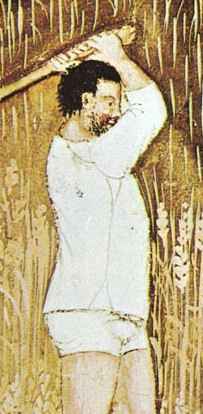
2 – Shirt and braies

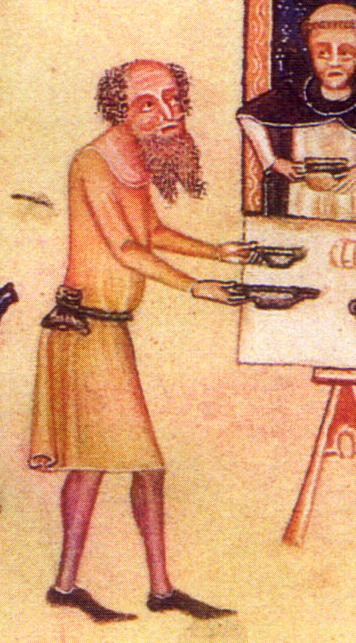
3 – Servant

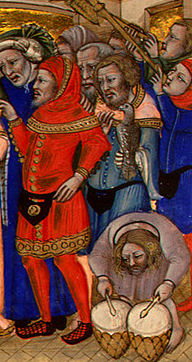
4 – Cotehardie and hood

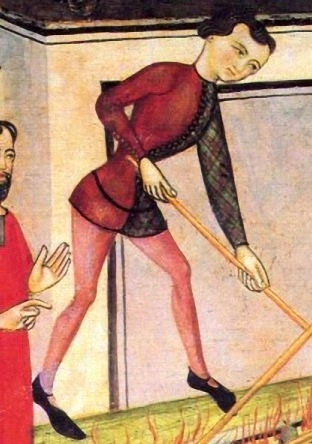
5 – Cotehardie

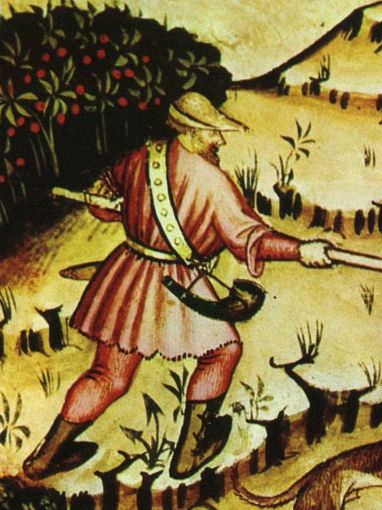
6 – Huntsman

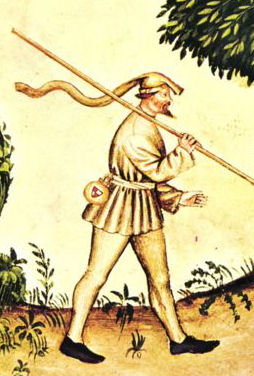
7 – Walking

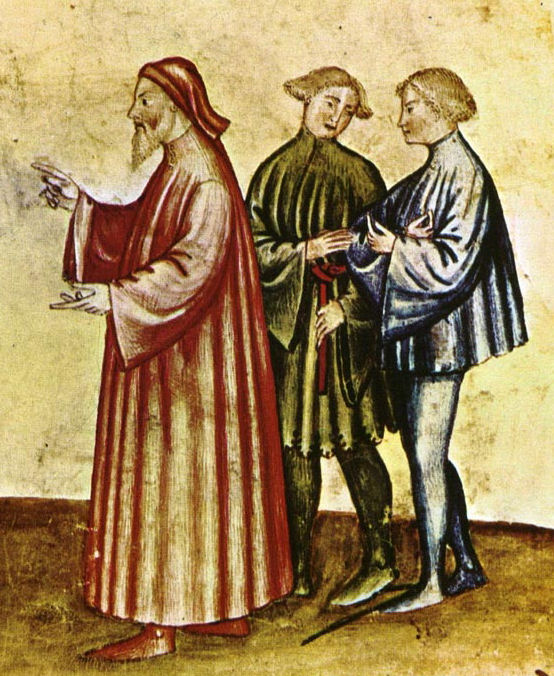
8 – Men's gowns
1. Braies are worn rolled over a belt at the waist. From the miniature of Breviari d'Amour, Catalonia, c. 14th century.
2. Shirt is made of rectangles with gussets at shoulder, underarm, and hem. From the Tacuinum Sanitatis, c. 14th century.
3. Serving man wears a knee-length tunic with long, tight sleeves over hose. Wears a belt with a waist-pouch or purse. His shoes are pointed. From the Luttrell Psalter, England, c. 1325–35.
4. Bridegroom wears a red cotehardie, hose, and hood. Italy, 1350s.
5. Man in a particolored cotehardie of reddish brown and plaid fabric. The cotehardie fits snugly and is buttoned up the front. A narrow belt is worn around the hips. Detail of the Altarpiece of St. Vincent, Catalonia, late 14th century.
6. Huntsman wears side-lacing boots, late 14th century.
7. Man walking in a brisk wind wears a chaperon that has been caught by a gust. He wears a belt pouch and carries a walking stick, late 14th century. From the Tacuinum Sanitatis.
8. Older man (chiding an indiscreet young woman, see image below) wears a long, loose houppelande. The fashionable young men wear short tunics, one with dagged edges. The man on the right wears shoes with long pointed toes, late 14th century. From the Tacuinum Sanitatis.

== Women's clothing ==
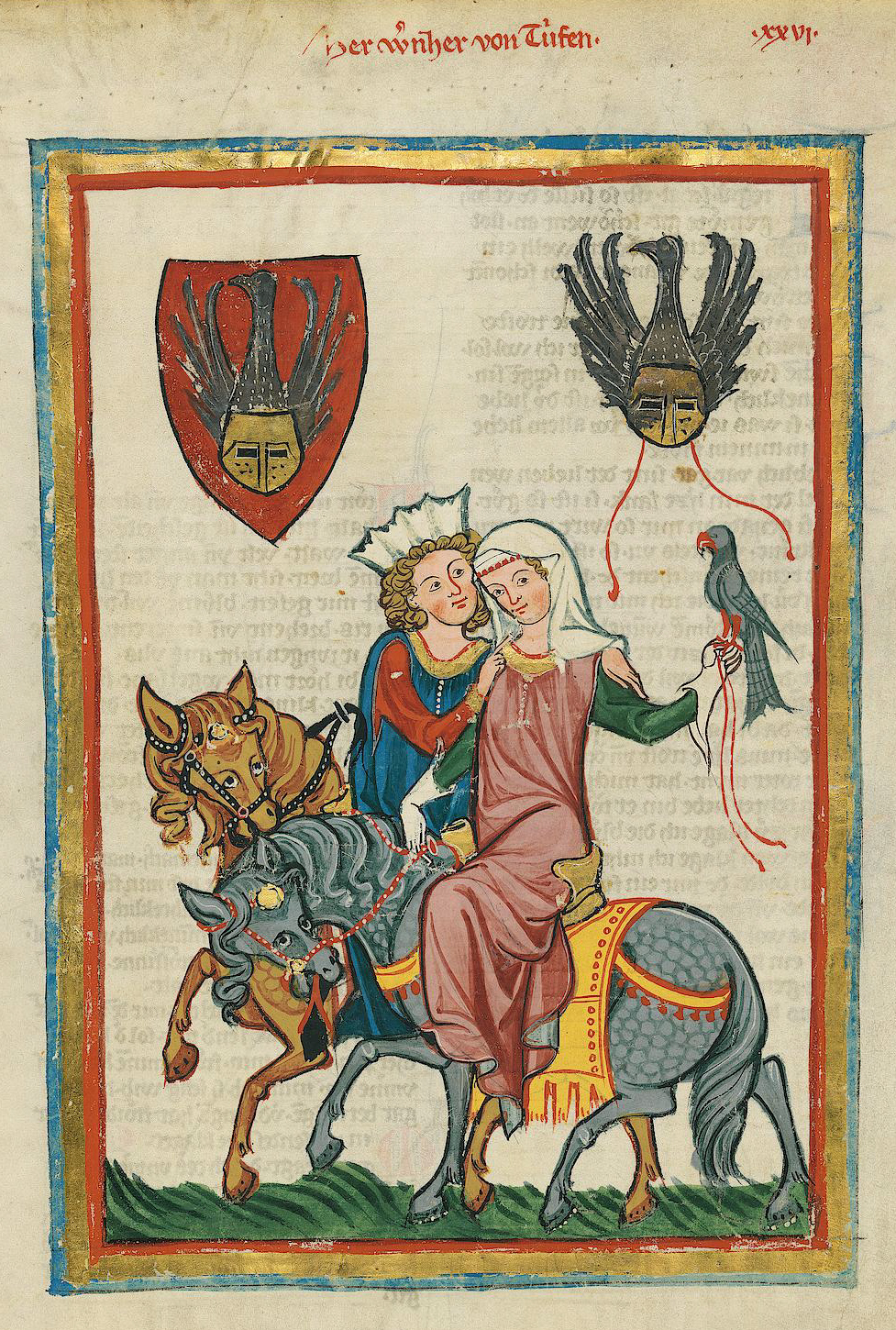
For hawking, this woman wears a pink sleeveless gown over a green kirtle, with a linen veil and white gloves. Codex Manesse, 1305–40

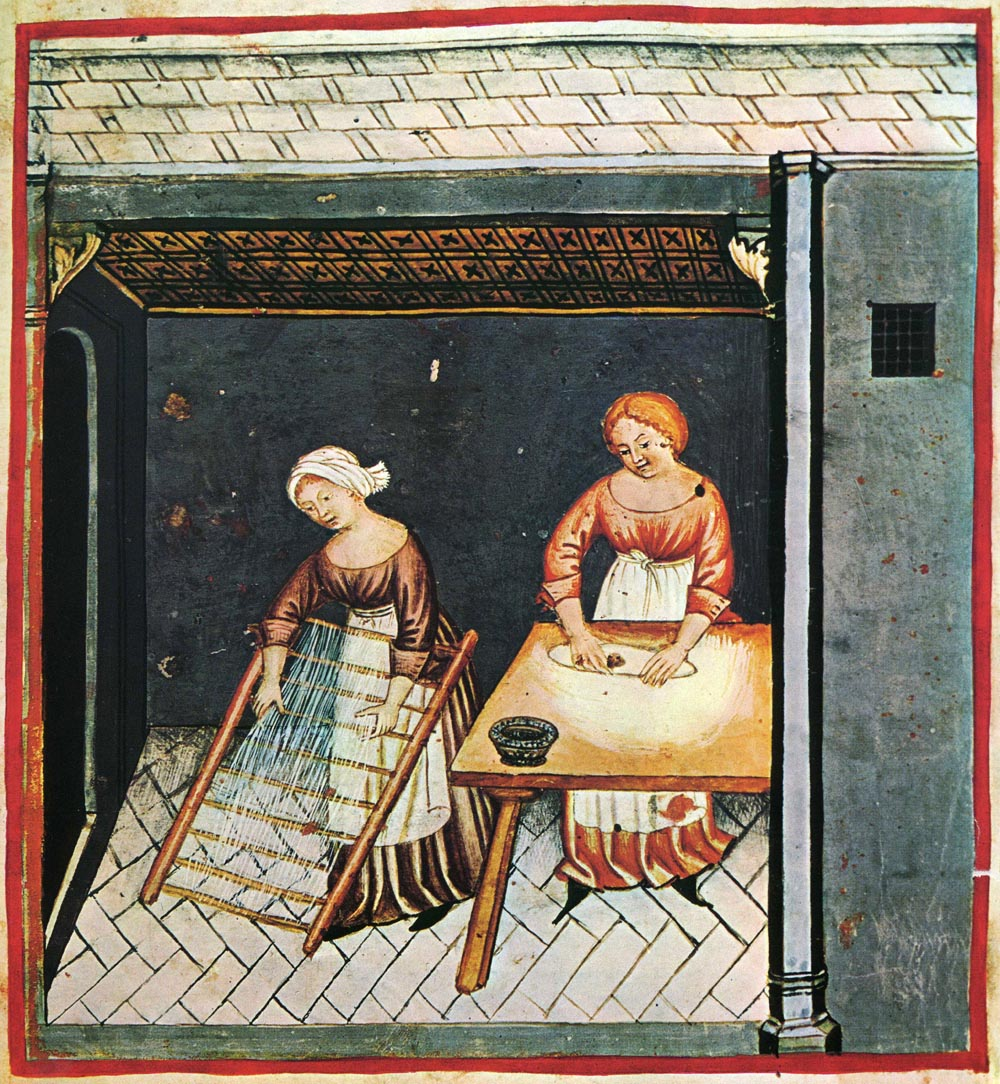
Women making pasta wear linen aprons over their gowns. Their sleeves are unbuttoned at the wrist and turned up out of the way, late 14th century

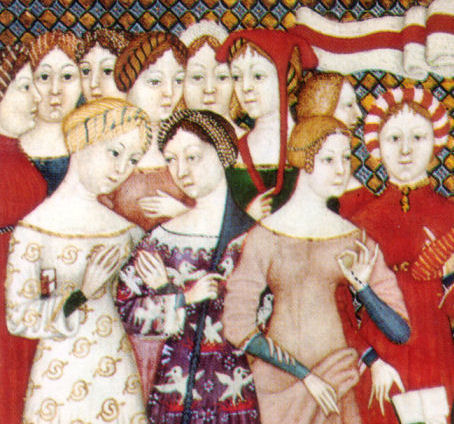
Many Italian women wear their hair twisted with cord or ribbon and bound around their heads, c. 1380

=== Underwear ===
The innermost layer of a woman's clothing was a linen or woolen chemise or smock, some fitting the figure and some loosely garmented, although there is some mention of a "breast girdle" or "breast band" which may have been the precursor of a modern bra. Women also wore hose or stockings, although women's hose generally only reached to the knee.

All classes and both sexes are usually shown sleeping naked—special nightwear only became common in the 16th century—yet some married women wore their chemises to bed as a form of modesty and piety. Many in the lower classes wore their undergarments to bed because of the cold weather at night time and since their beds usually consisted of a straw mattress and a few sheets, the undergarment would act as another layer.

=== Gowns and outerwear ===
Over the chemise, women wore a loose or fitted gown called a cotte or kirtle, usually ankle or floor-length, and with trains for formal occasions. Fitted kirtles had wide skirts made by adding triangular gores to widen the hem without adding bulk at the waist. Kirtles also had long, fitted sleeves that sometimes reached down to cover the knuckles.

Various sorts of overgowns were worn over the kirtle, and are called by different names by costume historians. When fitted, this garment is often called a cotehardie (although this usage of the word has been heavily criticized) and might have hanging sleeves and sometimes worn with a jeweled or metalworked belt. Over time, the hanging part of the sleeve became longer and narrower until it was the merest streamer, called a tippet, then gaining the floral or leaflike daggings in the end of the century.

Sleeveless overgowns or tabards derive from the cyclas, an unfitted rectangle of cloth with an opening for the head that was worn in the 13th century. By the early 14th century, the sides began to be sewn together, creating a sleeveless overgown or surcoat. Outdoors, women wore cloaks or mantles, often lined in fur. The houppelande was also adopted by women late in the century. Women invariably wore their houppelandes floor-length, the waistline rising up to right underneath the bust, sleeves very wide and hanging, like angel sleeves.

=== Headdresses ===
A woman's outfit was generally not complete without headwear. As with today, a medieval woman had many options- from straw hats, to hoods to elaborate headpieces. A woman's activity and occasion would dictate what she wore on her head.

In the Middle Ages, particularly the 14th and 15th centuries, there were some forms of headwear that involved high headpieces with elaborate structures, like the hennin. Prior to the hennin, padded rolls and truncated and reticulated headdresses were worn by wealthier women across Europe and England. Cauls, the cylindrical cages worn at the side of the head and temples, were also worn by wealthier women. Other more simple forms of headdress included the coronet or simple circlet of flowers.

==== Northern and western Europe ====
Married women in Northern and Western Europe wore some type of headcovering. The barbet was a band of linen that passed under the chin and was pinned on top of the head; it descended from the earlier wimple (in French, barbe), which was now worn only by older women, widows, and nuns. The barbet was worn with a linen fillet or headband, or with a linen cap called a coif, with or without a couvrechef (kerchief) or veil overall. It passed out of fashion by mid-century. Unmarried girls simply braided the hair to keep the dirt out.

The barbet and fillet or barbet and veil could also be worn over the crespine, a thick hairnet or snood. Over time, the crespine evolved into a mesh of jeweler's work that confined the hair on the sides of the head, and even later, at the back. This metal crespine was also called a caul, and remained stylish long after the barbet had fallen out of fashion. For example, it was used in Hungary until the beginning of the second half of the 15th century, as it was used by the Hungarian queen consort Barbara of Celje around 1440.

==== Italy ====
Uncovered hair was acceptable for women in the Italian states. Many women twisted their long hair with cords or ribbons and wrapped the twists around their heads, often without any cap or veil. Hair was also worn braided. Older women and widows wore a veil and wimple, and a simple knotted kerchief was worn while working. In the image at right, one woman wears a red hood draped over her twisted and bound hair.

=== Style gallery ===
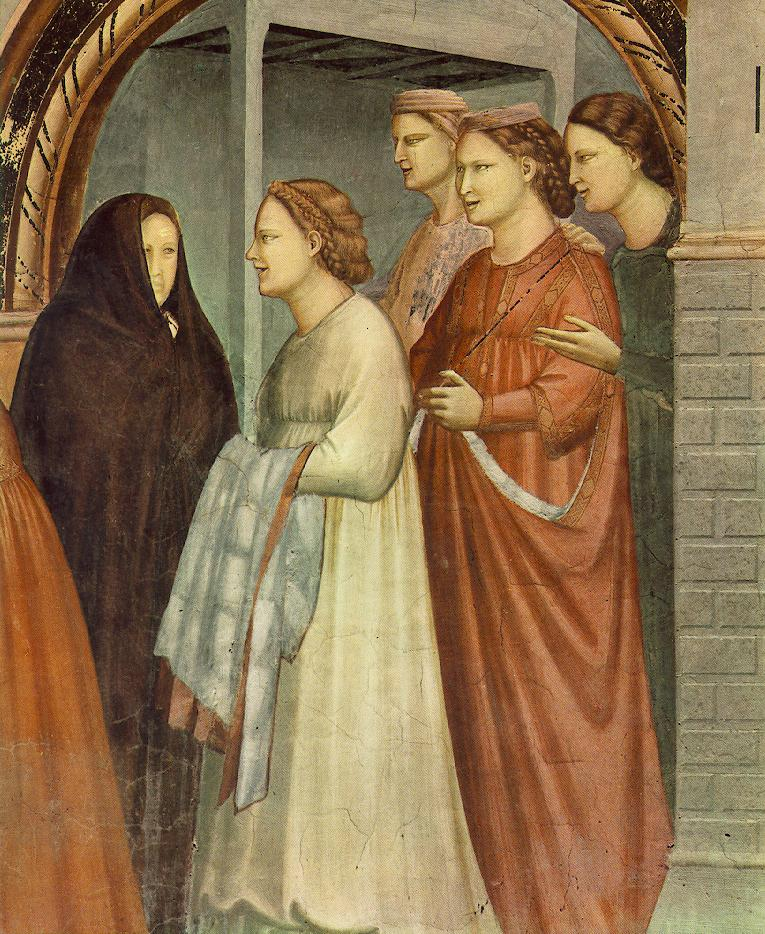
1 – Italian gowns

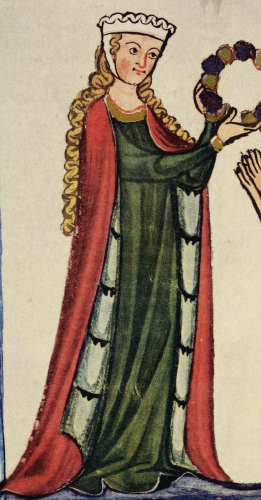
2 – Barbet and fillet

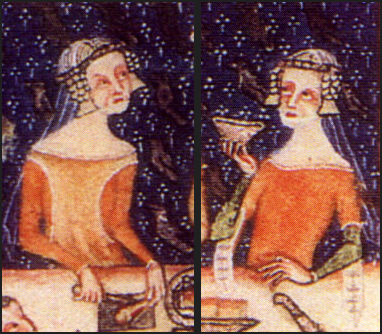
3 – Women dining

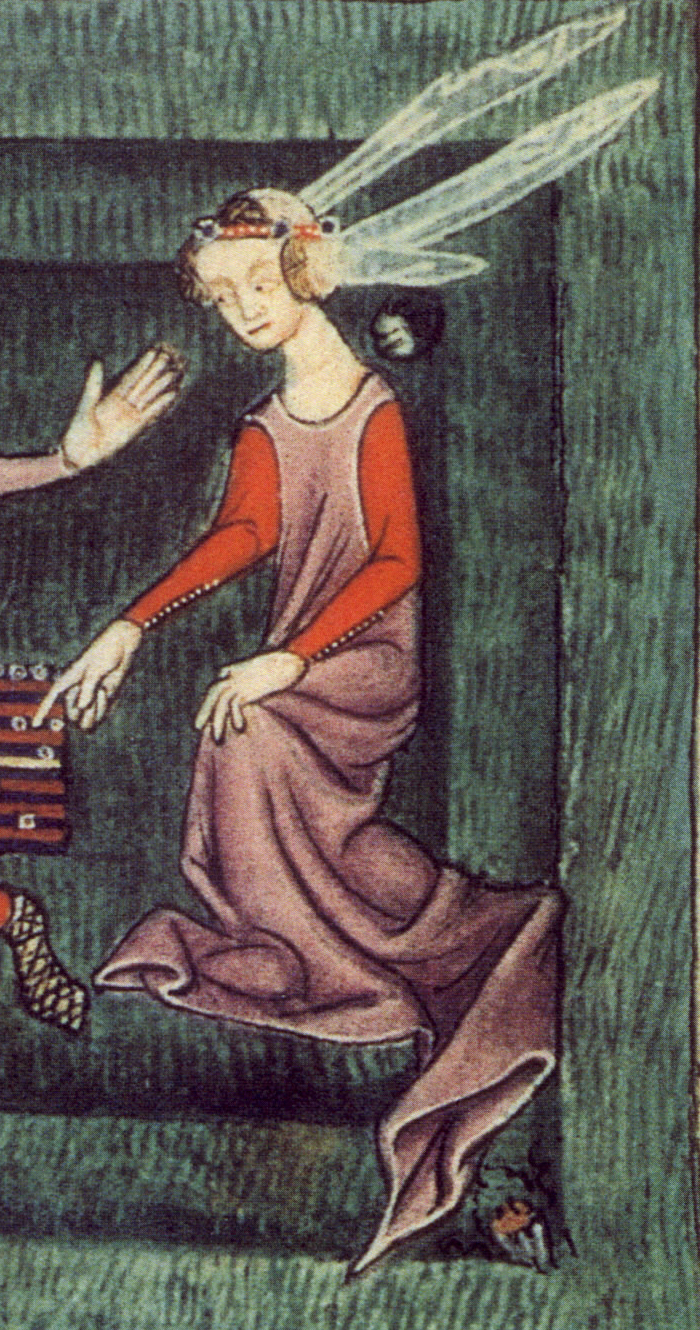
4 – In a garden

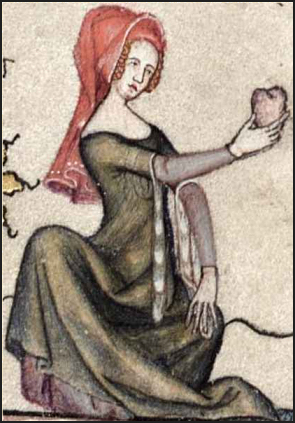
5 – Hood

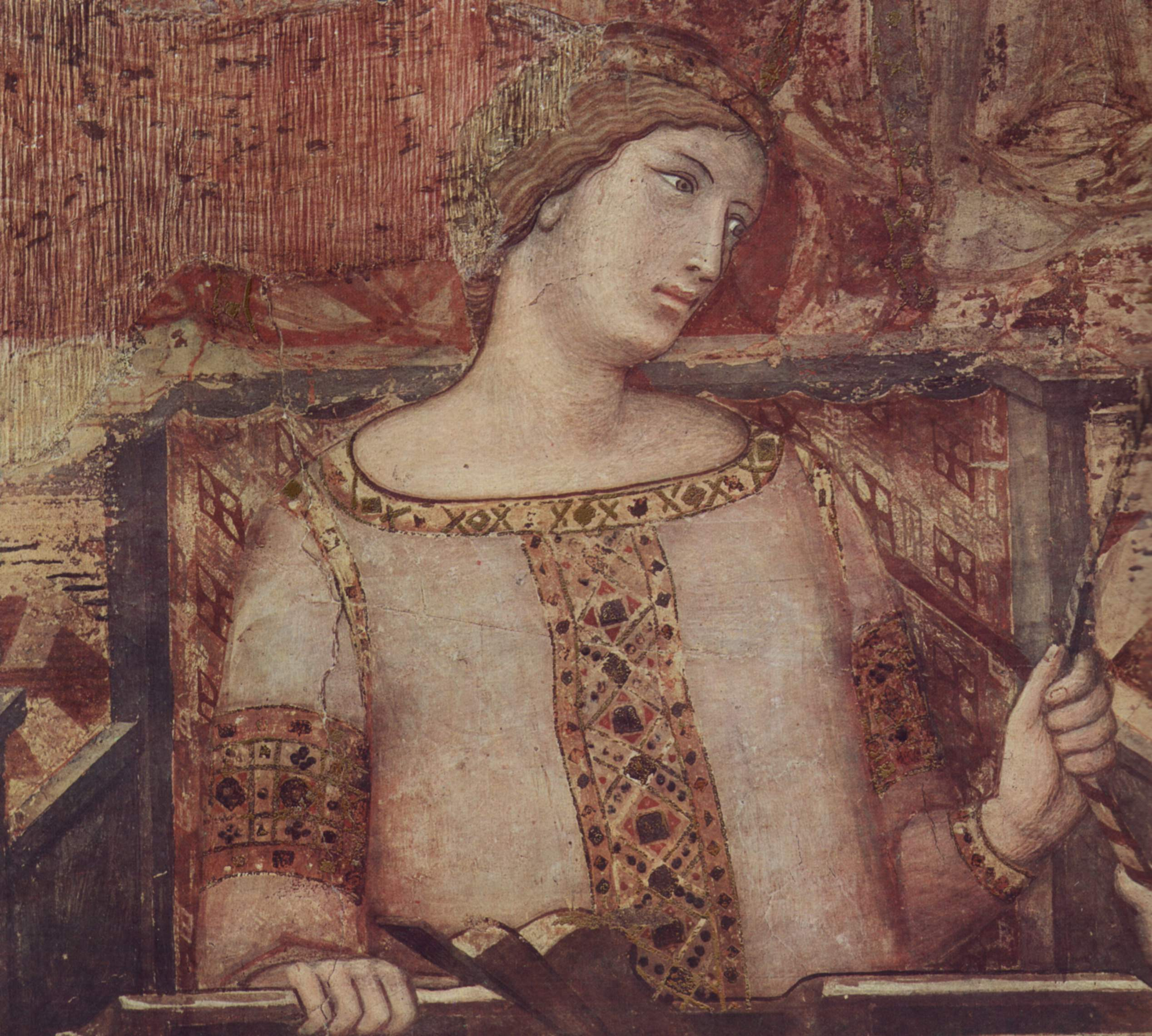
6 – Italian fashion

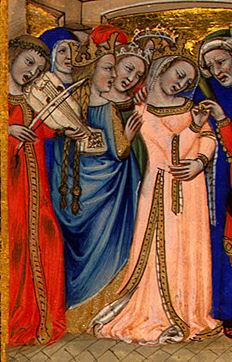
7 – Bride and ladies

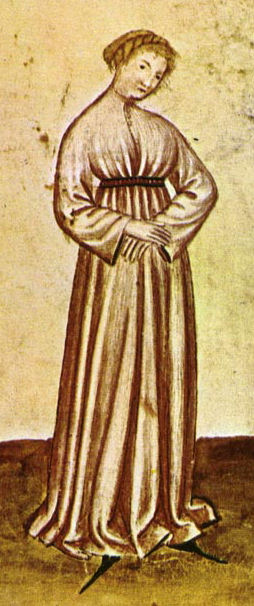
8 – Houppelande

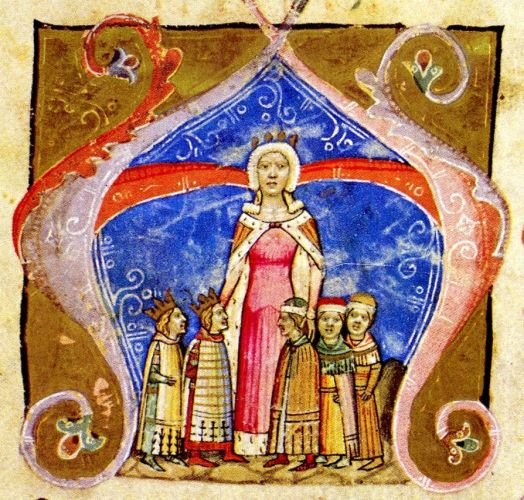
9 - Hungarian fashion
1. Italian gowns are high-waisted. Women's hair was often worn uncovered or minimally uncovered in Italy. Detail of a fresco by Giotto, Padua, 1304–06.
2. Woman presenting a chaplet wears a linen barbet and fillet headdress. She also wears a fur-lined mantle or cloak, c. 1305–1340.
3. Women at dinner wear their hair confined in braids or cauls over each ear, and wear sheer veils. The woman on the left wears a sideless surcoat over her kirtle, and the woman on the right wears an overgown with fur-lined hanging sleeves or tippets. From the Luttrell Psalter, England, c. 1325–35.
4. Woman in a garden on a breezy day. Her kirtle sleeves button from the elbow to the wrist, and she wears a sheer veil confined by a fillet or circlet. Her skirt has a long train. From the Luttrell Psalter, England.
5. Woman wearing a red hood on her head and a gown with vair-lined hanging sleeves or tippets. Illustration from the French Romance of Alexander, 1338–44.
6. Italian fashion of this period features broad bands of embroidered or woven trim on the dress and around the sleeves. Siena, c. 1340.
7. A bride wears a long fur-lined gown with hanging sleeves over a tight-sleeved kirtle, with a veil. Her gown is trimmed with embroidery or (more likely) braid. A royal lady wears a blue mantle hanging from her shoulders; her hair is worn in two braids beneath her crown. Italy, 1350s.
8. An indiscreet young woman wears an early houppelande and poulaines, the long pointed shoes that would be worn through most of the next century by the most fashionable. Her hair is wrapped and twisted around her head, late 14th century.
9. Hungarian fashion showing Elizabeth of Poland and her children. From the Chronicon Pictum, 14th century.

== Footwear ==
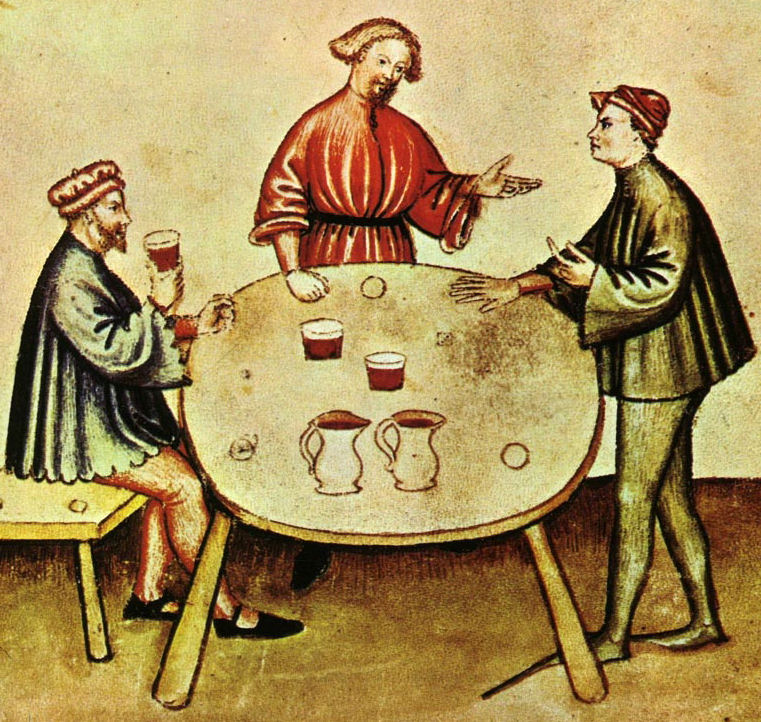
Conservative (left) and high-fashion (right) shoes of the late 14th century

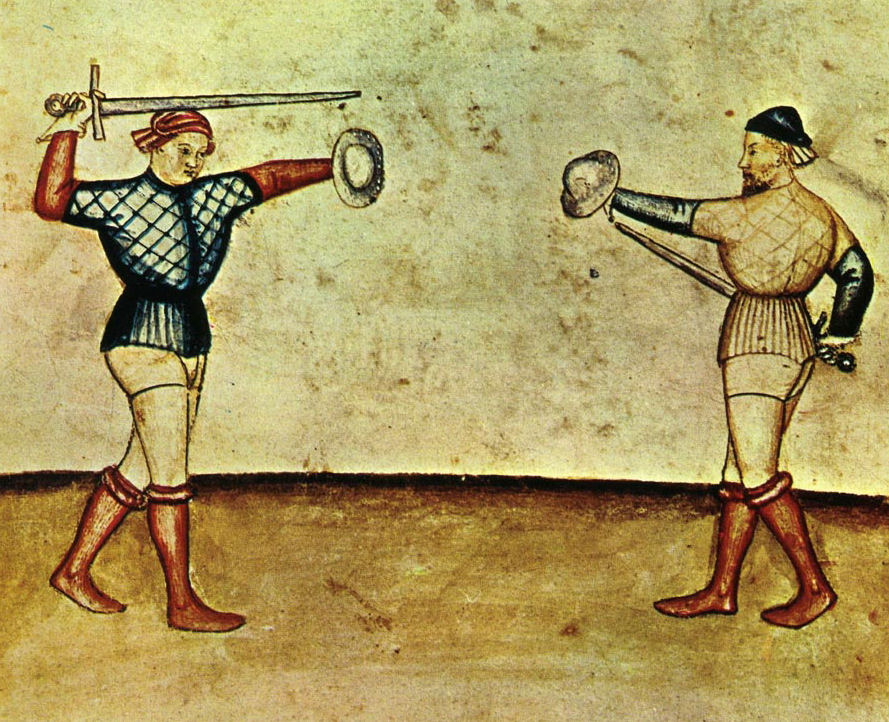
Men wear snug boots with cuffs for fencing, late 14th century. These are almost certainly not cuffed boots, but rather hose which have been rolled down over garters. This was common practice during this period for workers

Footwear during the 14th century generally consisted of the turnshoe, which was made out of leather. It was fashionable for the toe of the shoe to be a long point, which often had to be stuffed with material to keep its shape. A carved wooden-soled sandal-like type of clog or overshoe called a patten would often be worn over the shoe outdoors, as the shoe by itself was generally not waterproof.

== Working class clothing ==
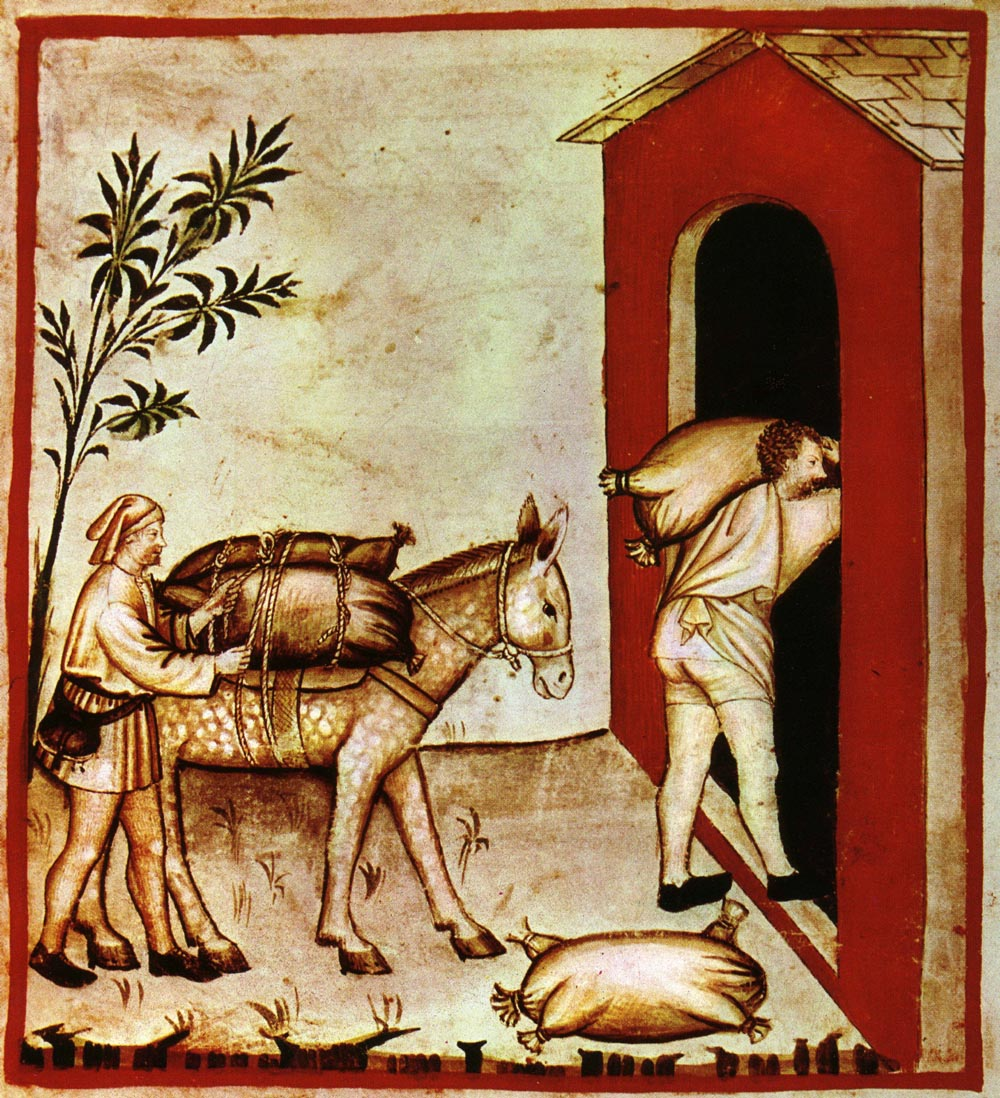
Storing olives

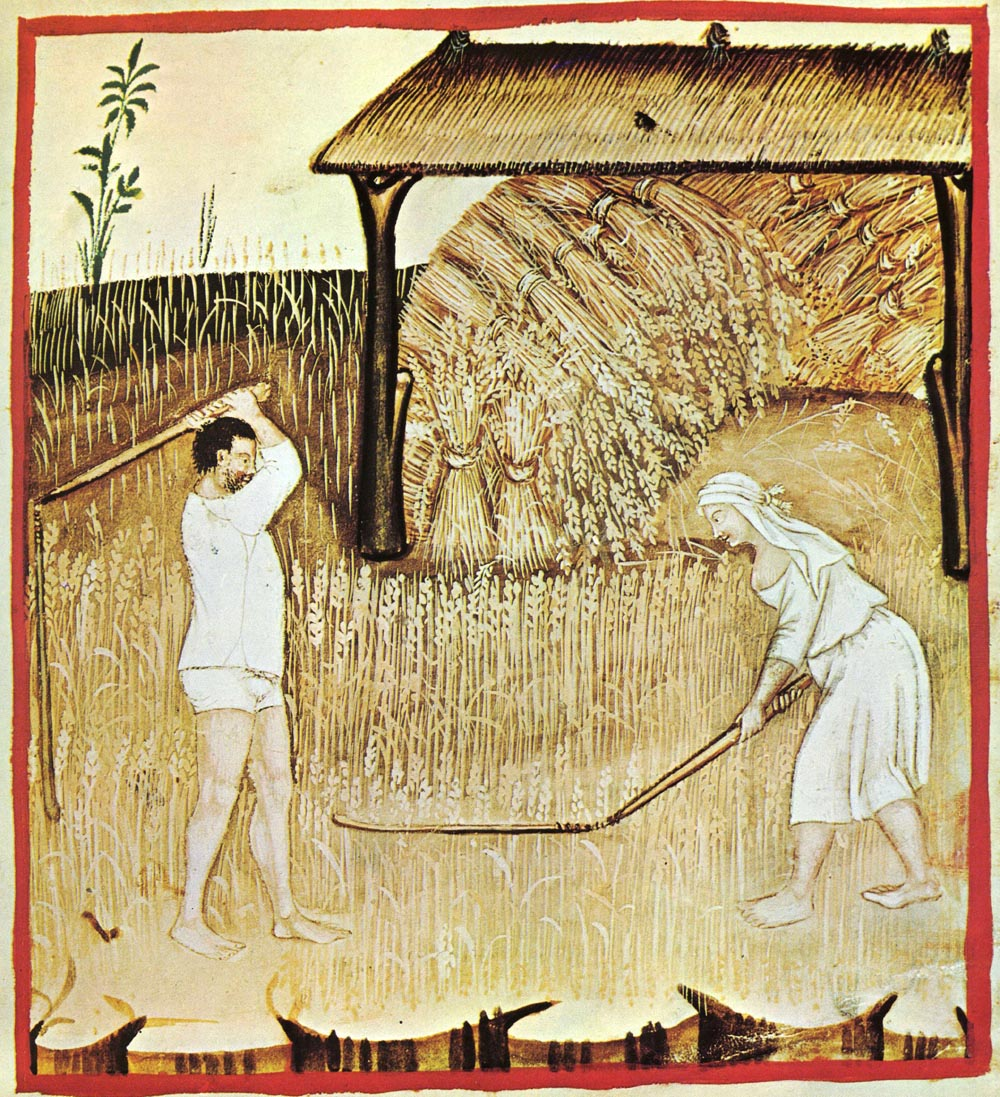
Threshing

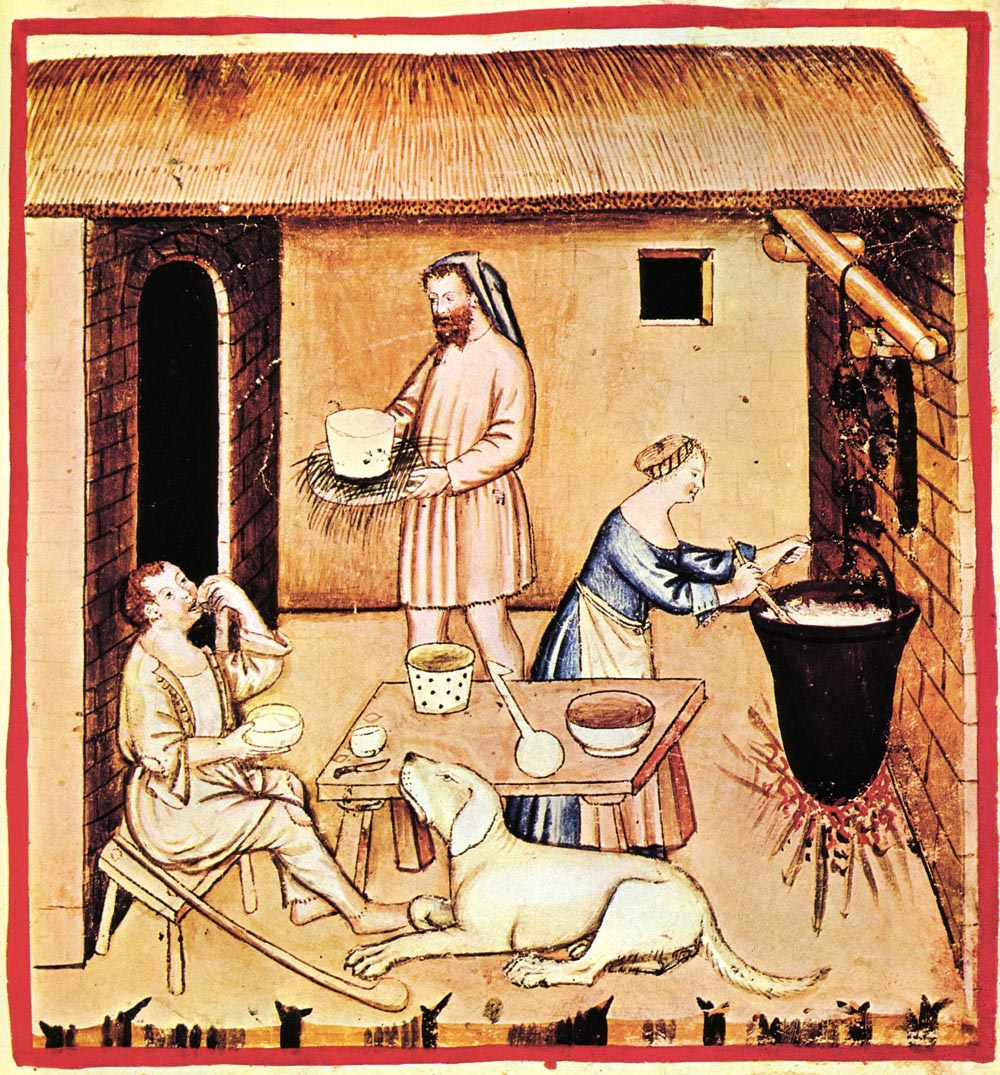
Cheesemaking

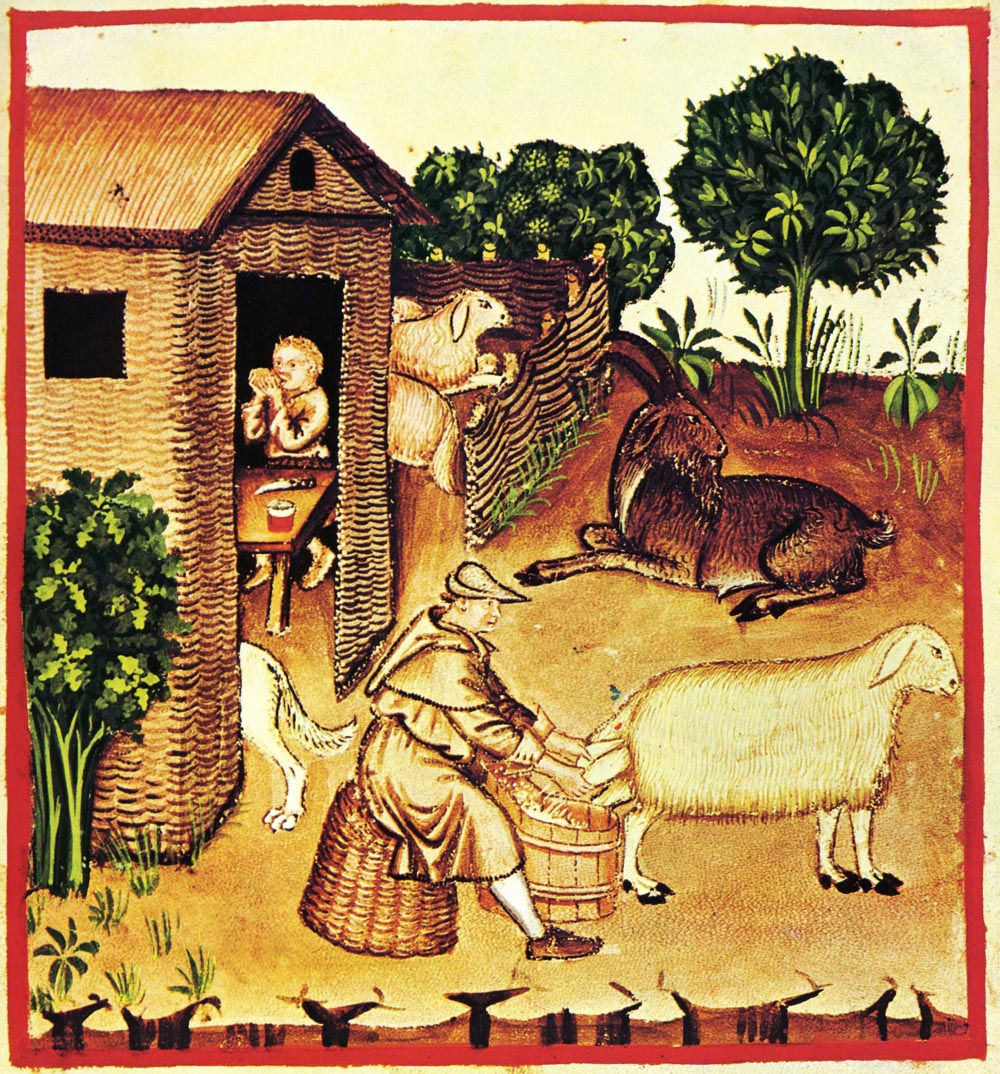
Milking

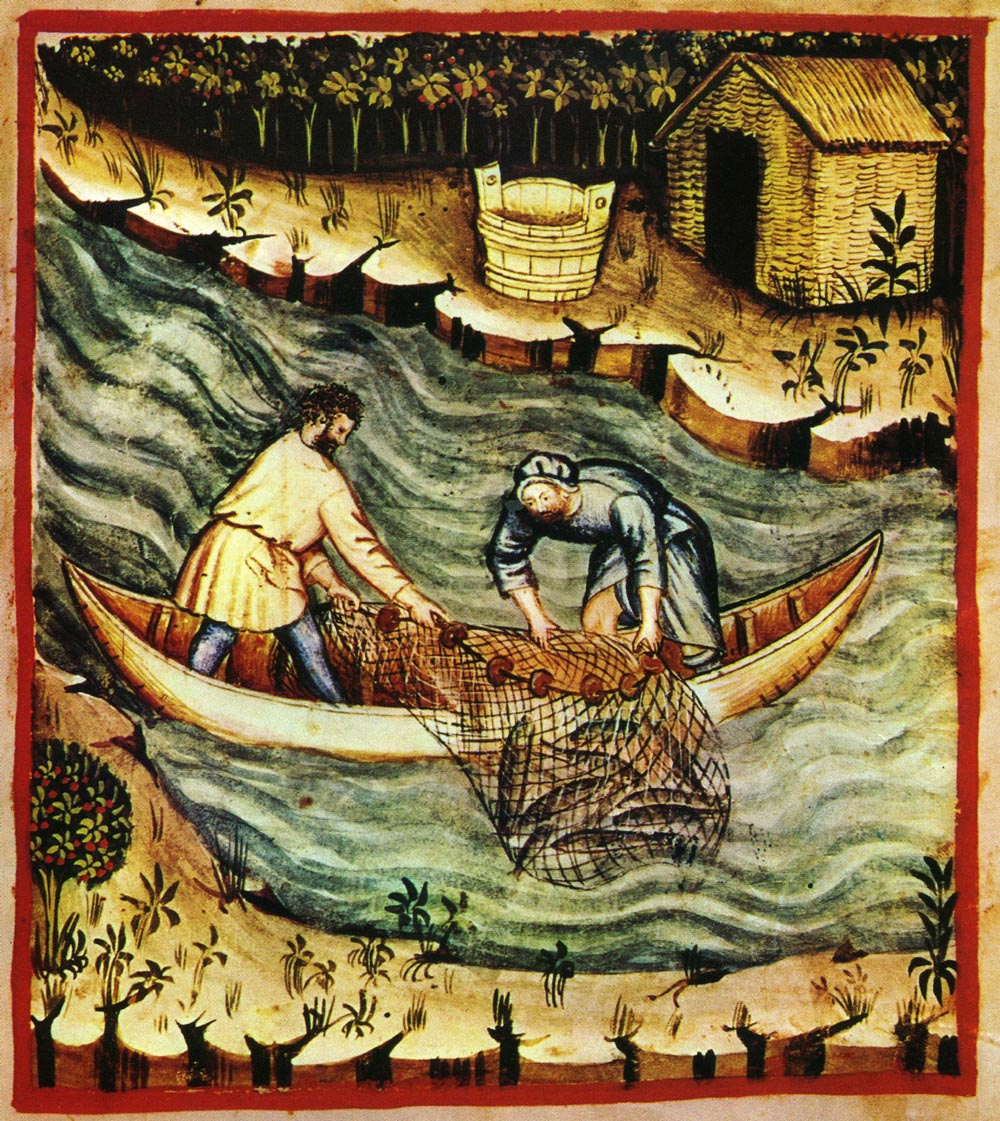
Fishing

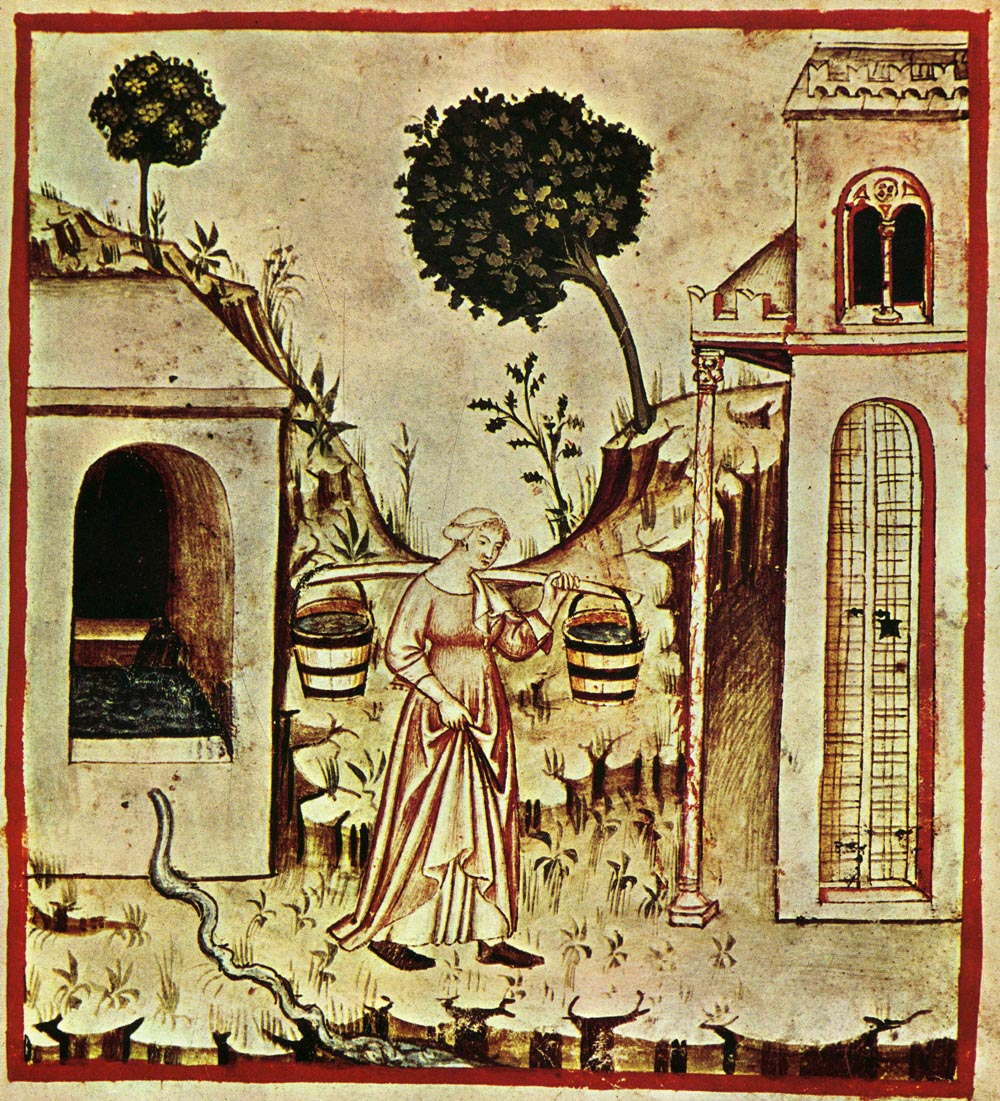
Carrying water

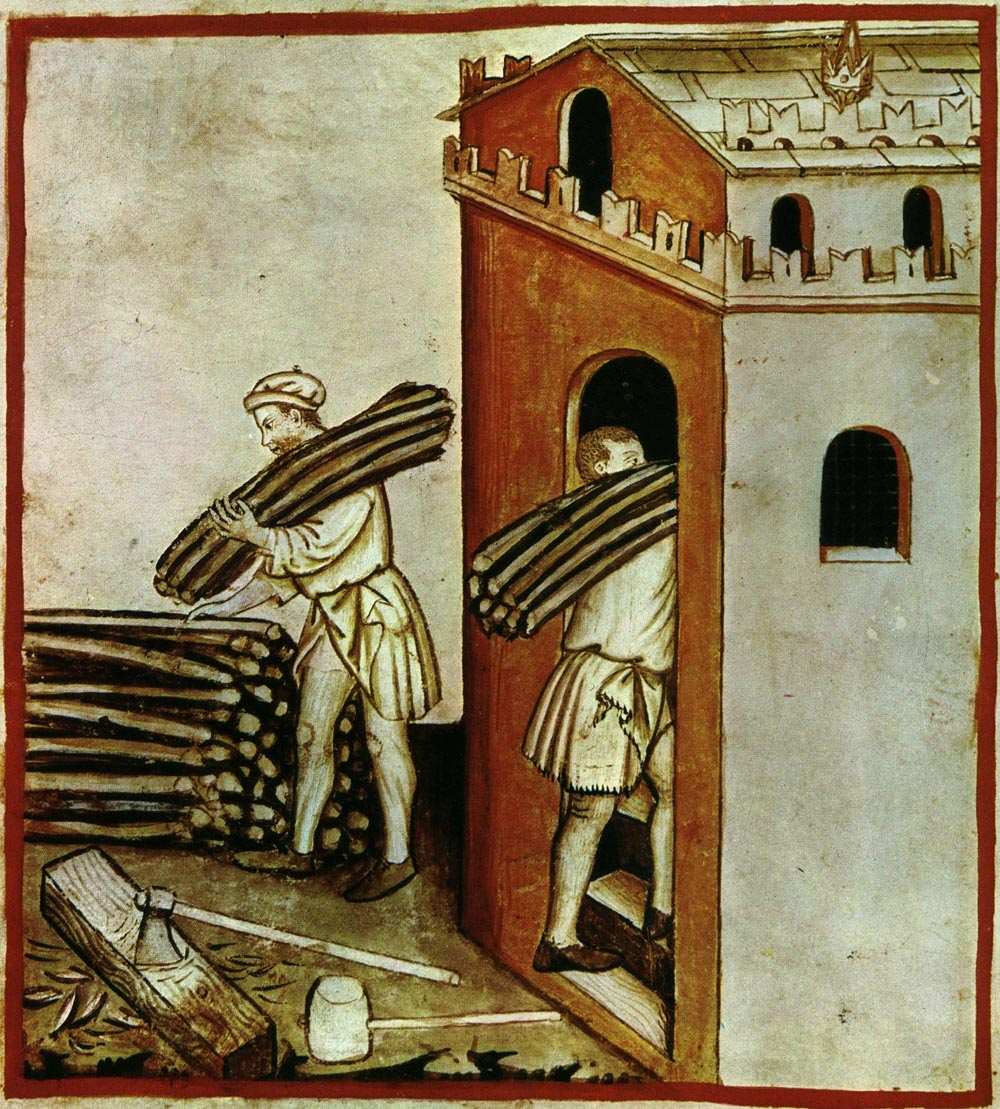
Storing wood

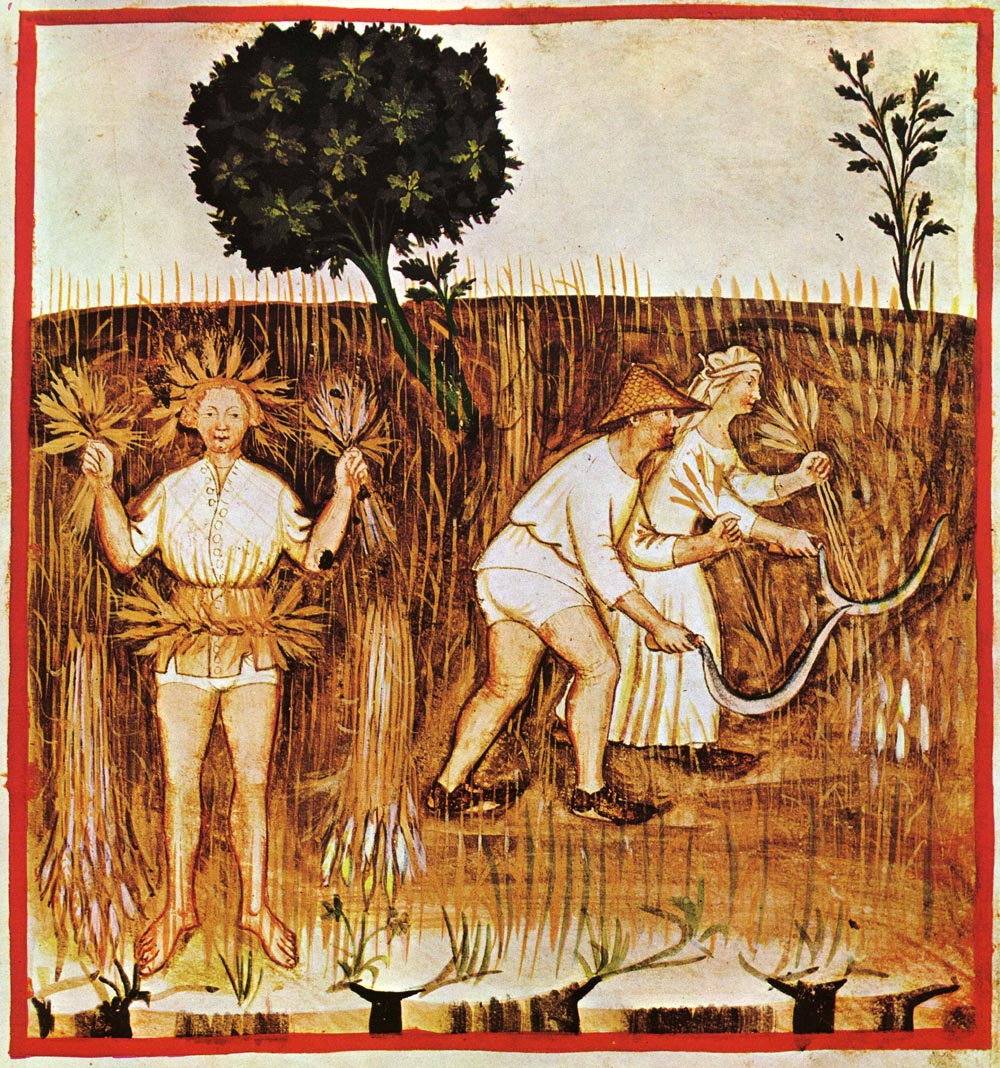
Harvesting grain

Images from a 14th-century manuscript of Tacuinum Sanitatis, a treatise on healthful living, show the clothing of working people: men wear short or knee-length tunics and thick shoes, and women wear knotted kerchiefs and gowns with aprons. For hot summer work, men wear shirts and braies and women wear chemises. Women tuck their gowns up when working.

== See also ==
- Early medieval European dress
- 1100–1200 in European fashion
- 1200–1300 in European fashion
- 1400–1500 in European fashion
- Byzantine dress
