= Herigaut =

Medieval outergarment

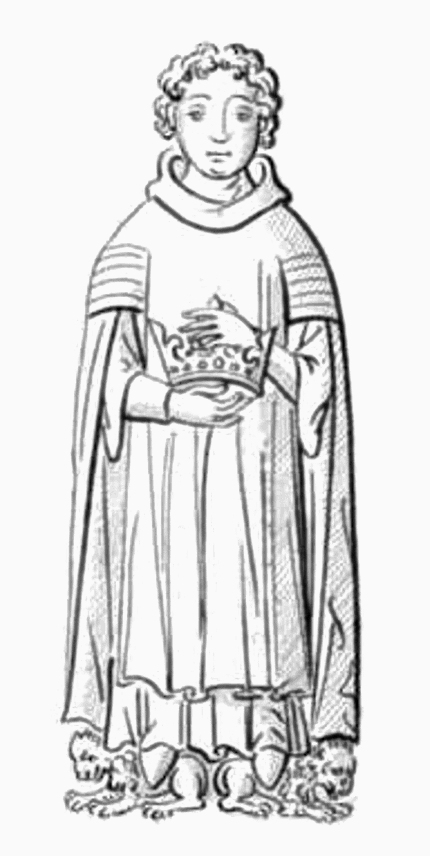
Charles, 6th Dauphin, from his tomb effigy. He is wearing a herigaut with tucked sleeves.

A herigaut is a gown-like garment worn in the thirteenth and early fourteenth centuries. Alternative spellings include herigald, heregaud, gerygoud and herigans. It was three-quarters to full length with hanging sleeves. Sometimes the sleeves were tucked at the top to increase fullness below. Although it was primarily a men's garment, women occasionally wore it as well. Along with the garnache, it is a variant of the garde-corps, and it is also related to the houppelande.
