= Cyclas (beetle) =

Scientific classification
- Kingdom: Animalia
- Phylum: Arthropoda
- Class: Insecta
- Order: Coleoptera
- Suborder: Polyphaga
- Infraorder: Cucujiformia
- Family: Curculionidae
- Genus: Cyclas

Species
- Several, including: Cyclas angustatus Labram & Imhoff, 1838; Cyclas brunneus Latreille; Cyclas longirostris

Genus of beetles

Cyclas is a genus of true weevils.
