= Cyclas (garment) =

The cyclas (Ancient Greek: κυκλάς), derived from the Greek word meaning "circular", was a luxurious, circular-shaped robe. It had a decorative border at the bottom, which was often inlaid with gold. This garment was made from a light, thin fabric, possibly muslin. Emperor Alexander Severus tried to limit extravagance by allowing women to own only one cyclas each, and restricting the gold decoration to no more than six unciae (a unit of weight). The cyclas remained a ceremonial garment into the fifth century.

Though mainly worn by women, it was not exclusively female attire. For example, the emperor Caligula was known to wear a cyclas in public as a sign of effeminacy, and Saturninus once donned his wife’s cyclas as a symbolic imperial garment when he decided to take power.

During the Middle Ages the term cyclas referred to an unfitted rectangle of cloth with an opening for the head that was worn in Europe.

Sleeveless overgowns or tabards derive from the cyclas. By the early 14th century, the sides began to be sewn together, creating a sleeveless overgown or surcoat.

== See also ==
- 1300–1400 in European fashion
