= Surcoat =

Outer garment commonly worn in the Middle Ages in Western Europe

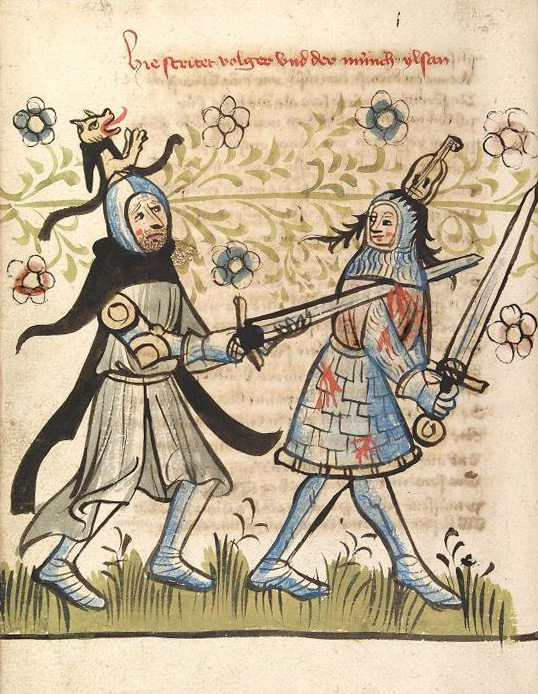
The classic knight's surcoat is on the left; the knight on the right has a different style, possibly a jupon

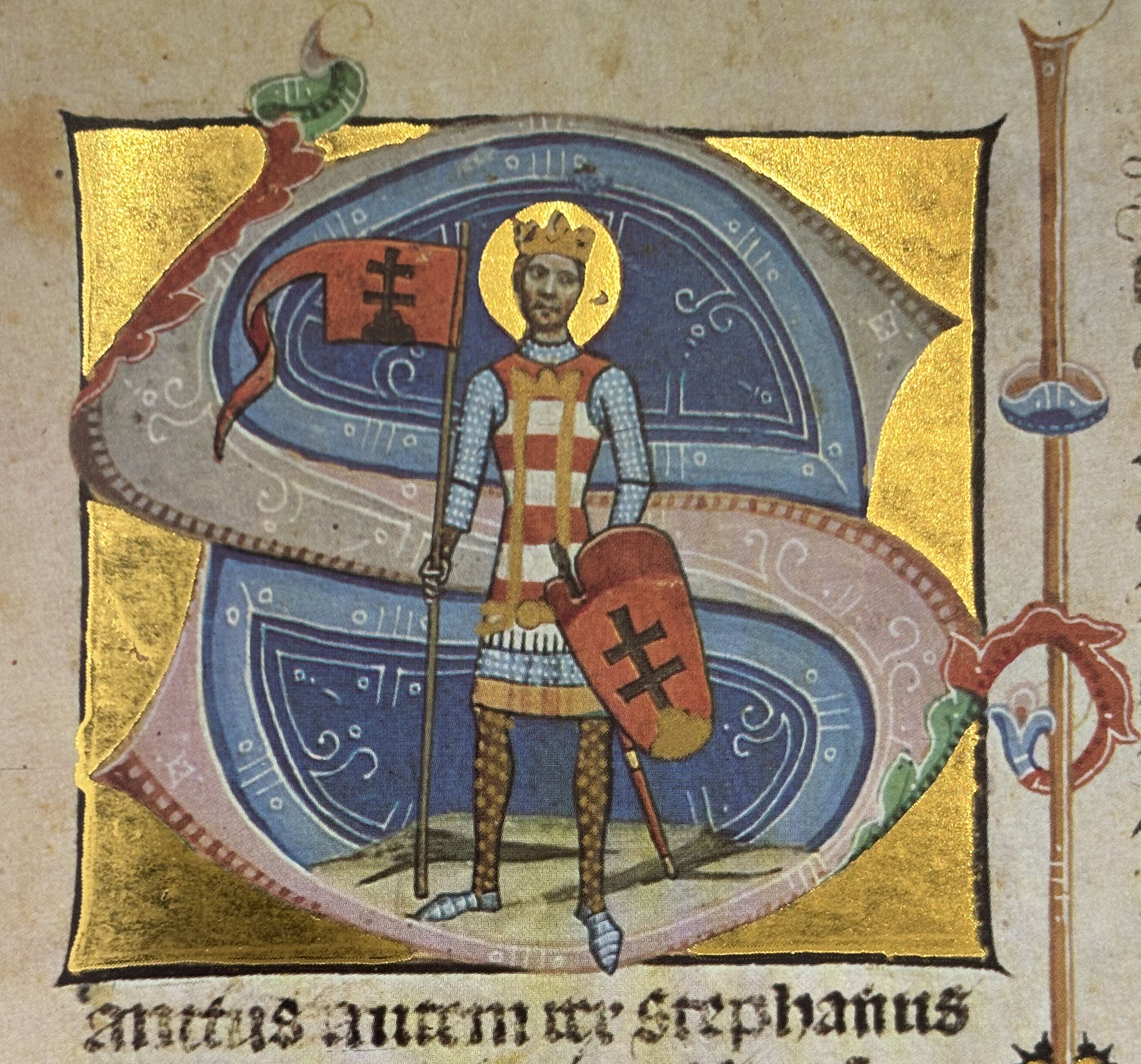
Saint Stephen, King of Hungary with a coat of plates or jupon bearing his arms, white and red stripes. Image from the Hungarian Illuminated Chronicle.

A surcoat or surcote is an outer garment that was commonly worn by soldiers in the Middle Ages. It was worn over armor to show insignia and help identify what side the soldier was on. On the battlefield, the surcoat helped keep the sun off the soldier and their armor, reducing the risk of heat illness. The name derives from French, meaning "over the coat", a long, loose, often sleeveless coat reaching down to the feet.

== History ==
=== Men's surcoat ===
Starting around the late 12th century, knights wore long, flowing surcoats. From the mid to late-13th century, these were frequently emblazoned with their personal arms, shown over their armour. These usually extended to about mid-calf, were either sleeved or sleeveless, and had slits in the bottom, both front and back, allowing the wearer to ride their horses comfortably. Some historians believe that the practice of wearing white surcoats was adopted during the Crusades, their main purpose being to reflect the direct sun, which overheated the armour and the soldier inside – although it may be argued that here its color would have been of little help, while in poor weather they helped keep rain and the muck of battle away from the easily corroded mail links. The surcoat displayed the device of the knight (origin of the term "coat of arms"), thereby identifying him, which in turn, combined with the increased use of the great helm (late 12th century, early 13th century), became an essential means of recognition. Indeed, some historians cite this as one of the reasons behind the spread of heraldry across medieval Europe. In the early fourteenth century, the front of the knight's surcoat was shortened so that it was longer at the back and knee-length at the front, allowing greater freedom of movement and eliminating the danger of a rider getting his spurs caught in the garment. By the mid-fourteenth century, it was replaced with the "jupon" (or "gipon"), which was a much shorter item and was often padded for supplementary protection.

In the 15th century, once suits of plate armour became common, the surcoat was phased out of use. This period in the history of armour development, in which surcoats became increasingly rare, is referred to as the "surcoatless period" and lasted from 1420 to 1485.

=== Women's surcoat ===
Women began wearing surcoats during the 13th century, both with and without sleeves. A particular style, known as the sideless surcoat, developed as a fashion in the 14th century. This was a sleeveless, floor-length garment featuring exaggerated armholes, which at their most extreme were open from shoulder to hip, revealing the gown underneath. The narrow strip covering the torso, known as the plackard, was usually no more than a foot wide. The style drew criticism from some moralists, who thought the garment drew an inappropriate amount of attention to the female body. Despite this, sideless surcoats continued to be worn as ceremonial dress well into the 15th century, long after they had ceased to be fashionable. Some estimates place them being worn as state apparel as late as 1525.

== Gallery ==
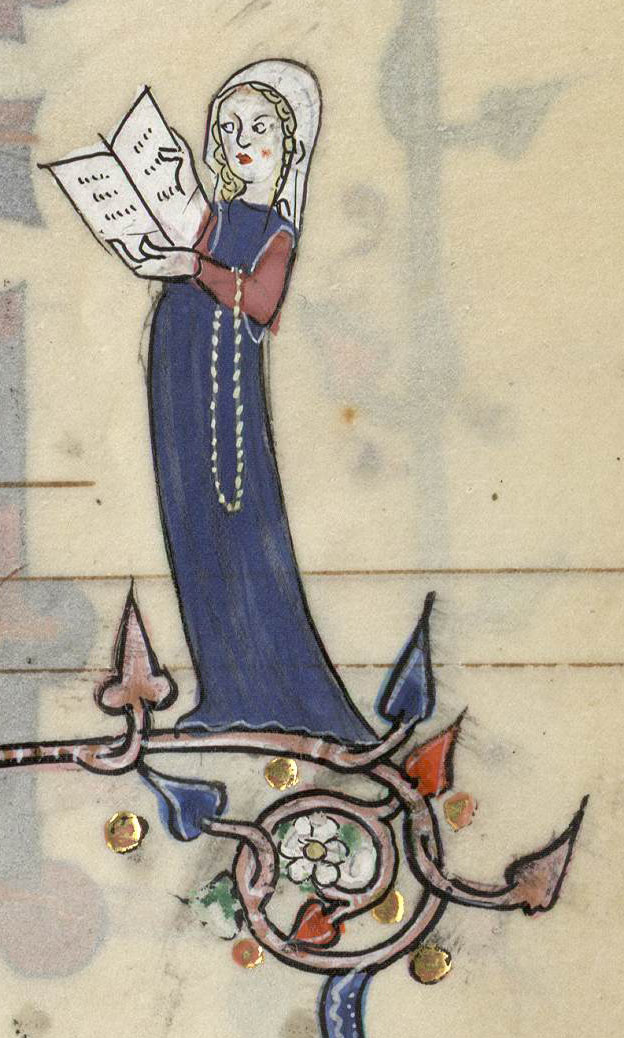
c. 1300-1310

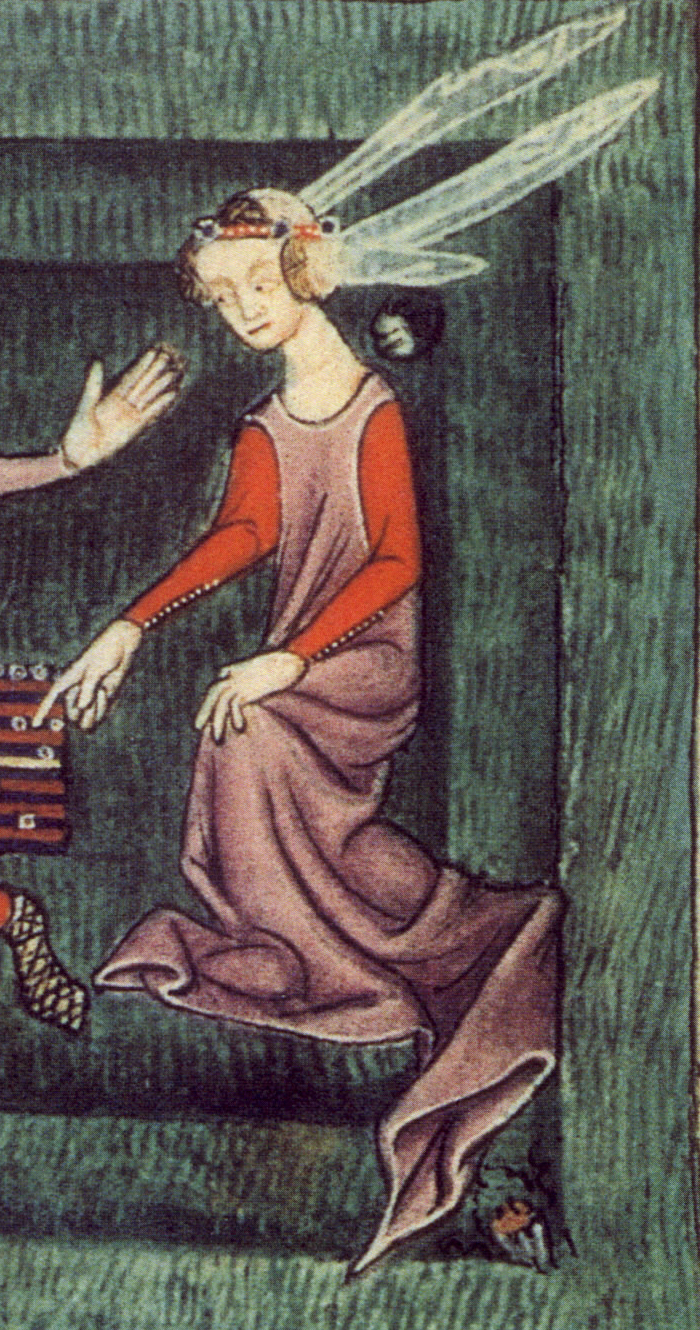
An early example of a sideless surcoat, c. 1325-1335

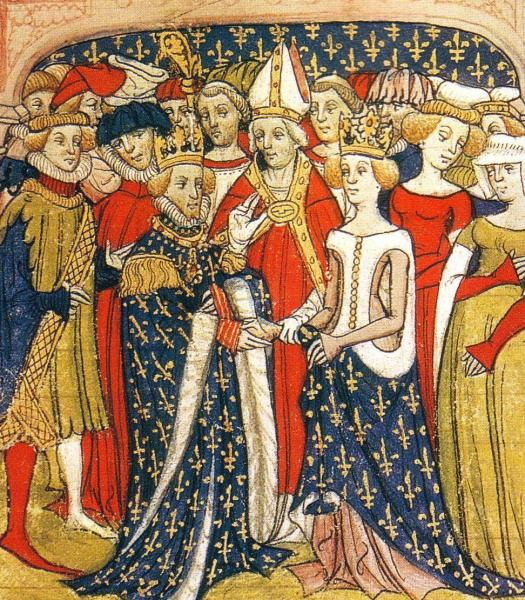
A sideless surcoat with gaping armholes, late 14th century

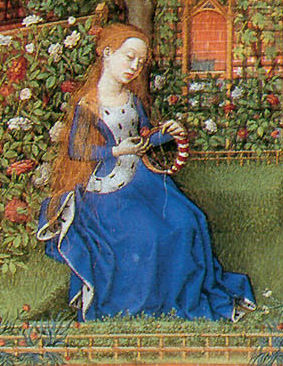
Sideless surcoat edged with ermine, c. 1460

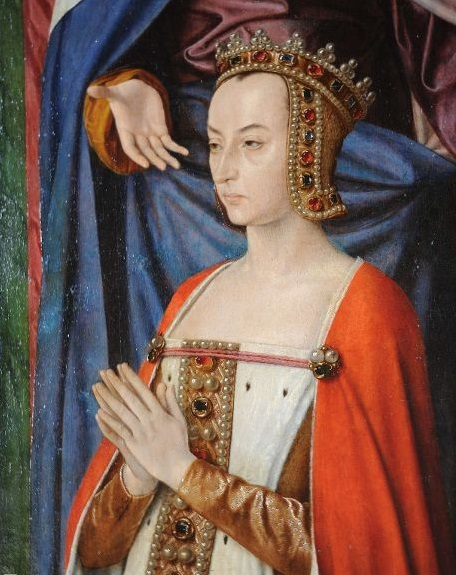
A furred, embellished surcoat worn for ceremonial purposes, 1489-1499

== See also ==
- Tabard

== Sources ==
- Nunn, Joan, Fashion in costume, 1200-2000, New Amsterdam Books, 2000, ISBN 1-56663-279-X
