= History of fashion design =

Evolution of fashion world

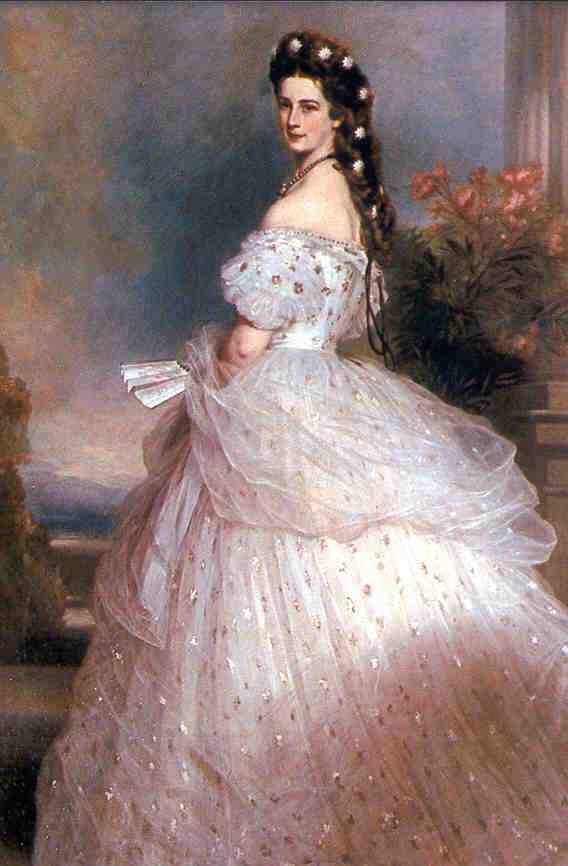
Dress attributed to Charles Frederick Worth for Elisabeth of Austria painted by Franz Xaver Winterhalter

The history of fashion design refers specifically to the development of the purpose and intention behind garments, shoes, accessories, and their design and construction. The modern industry, based around firms or fashion houses run by individual designers, started in the 19th century with Charles Frederick Worth.

Before the mid-19th century, there was no overt division between haute couture and ready-to-wear clothing. The most basic pieces of female clothing were made-to-measure by dressmakers and seamstresses dealing directly with the client. Tailors made some female clothing from woollen cloth. More is known about elite women's fashion than that of any other social group.

Early studies of children's fashion typically pulled from sources of folklore, cultural studies, and anthropological field-based works. One trend across centuries was that Christian people typically dressed in their finest clothes, referred to as 'Sunday best', while attending church. Another is the importance of 'hand-me-downs,' receiving used clothing. In addition to hand-me-downs, sharing clothing among siblings has also been a trend throughout history. Prior to the nineteenth century, European and North American children's clothing patterns were often similar to adult's clothing, with children dressed as miniature adults. Textiles have also always been a major part of any fashion as textiles could express the wearer's wealth. Before World War I infant boys at times were dressed in skirts and had longer hair. Contemporary color coding for genders was not common until the 1920s. The design of white dresses for girls was popular during this time frame because it was practical and simple, not only to make but increasingly to purchase readymade. Clothing for both genders typically covered the whole body as it was a practice of modesty. Textiles used for children's clothing usually consisted of linen, lightweight cotton, or silk.

The development of lithography allowed for the cheap production and dissemination of fashion plates, which in turn enabled fashion to spread throughout Europe and the wider world. Fashion plates were typically produced in Paris; regional dressmakers would then interpret and reproduce the clothing depicted. The origin of these designs were created by the most fashionable figures, typically those at court, along with their Dressmakers and tailors. Before this fashions were shared through the distribution of dressed dolls from France (since the 16th century) and engravings of fashion ( abraham brasse made in the 1620s). The pace that fashion changed sped again 1780s with increased publication of French engravings illustrating the latest Paris styles, followed by fashion magazines such as Cabinet des Modes.

In the 20th century, the invention of a new printing process called rotogravure allowed magazines and newspapers to include images. Talented illustrators – among them Paul Iribe, Georges Lepape, Erté, and George Barbier – drew fashion plates for these publications, showing the most recent developments in fashion and beauty. The most famous of these magazines was La Gazette du Bon Ton which was founded in 1912 by Lucien Vogel and regularly published until 1925.

== Before 1900: Couture beginnings ==
During the early 18th century, the first fashion designers emerged. In the 1720s, Françoise Leclerc ( the queen’s dress maker) became sought after by the women of the French aristocracy. In the mid century Marie Madeleine Duchapt, Mademoiselle Alexandre and Le Sieur Beaulard all gained national recognition and expanded their customer base from the French aristocracy to foreign aristocracy. However, Rose Bertin is generally regarded as the first internationally famous fashion designer.

Rose Bertin (2 July 1747 – 22 September 1813), dubbed the 'Minister of Fashion', was the dressmaker to Marie Antoinette, Queen of France from 1770 to 1793. Bertin opened a shop in Paris and had a considerable influence on Parisian style, until the French Revolution forced her into exile in London.

Because she was an outsider in the French Court, Marie Antoinette relied on Bertin's meticulous designs to help her "combat her enemies with style". Marie Antoinette's unique fashion preferences such as masculine riding breeches or simple muslin shift dresses, contrasted sharply with elaborate gowns of the time. The Queen attempted to create a persona that would allow the citizens of France to connect with her and her lifestyle. Although Marie Antoinette's attempts were largely unsuccessful, the way in which Bertin helped the Queen express herself through fashion was groundbreaking and set a precedent for the monarchs who followed abd their designers(such as Louis Hippolyte Leroy).

By the early 19th century, designers such as Ann Margaret Lanchester and Mary Ann Bell were expanding their businesses, and publishing their own designs in fashion magazines.

Parisian designers, such as Madame Vignon, Madame Victorine and Madame Palmyre, created in collaboration with their clients wishes, to produce something unique.

An Englishman living in Paris, Charles Frederick Worth (1825–1905) is regarded as the first designer in the modern sense of the term. He had a large business employing many largely anonymous tailors and seamstresses. Worth's success was such that he was able to dictate what customers should wear. Ornately decorated and constructed from the finest materials, Worth's gowns were well known for their crinolines (cage-like metal structures that held the dress out in a stylish shape).He was the Empress Eugénie's primary designer and he used his royal connections to gain recognition and clients. On February 1st in 1853 Napoleon III proclaimed that no visitors would be received to his court without formal dress. This increased the popularity of Worth-style gowns even further.

Throughout the early decades of the 20th century, high fashion originated in Paris and, to a lesser extent, London. Fashion magazines from other countries sent editors to the Paris fashion shows. Department stores also sent buyers to the Paris shows, where they purchased garments to copy the style lines and trim details of others. Both made-to-measure salons and ready-to-wear departments featured the latest Paris trends. Styles were adapted to the stores' assumptions about the lifestyles and budget of their targeted customer.

== 1900s ==
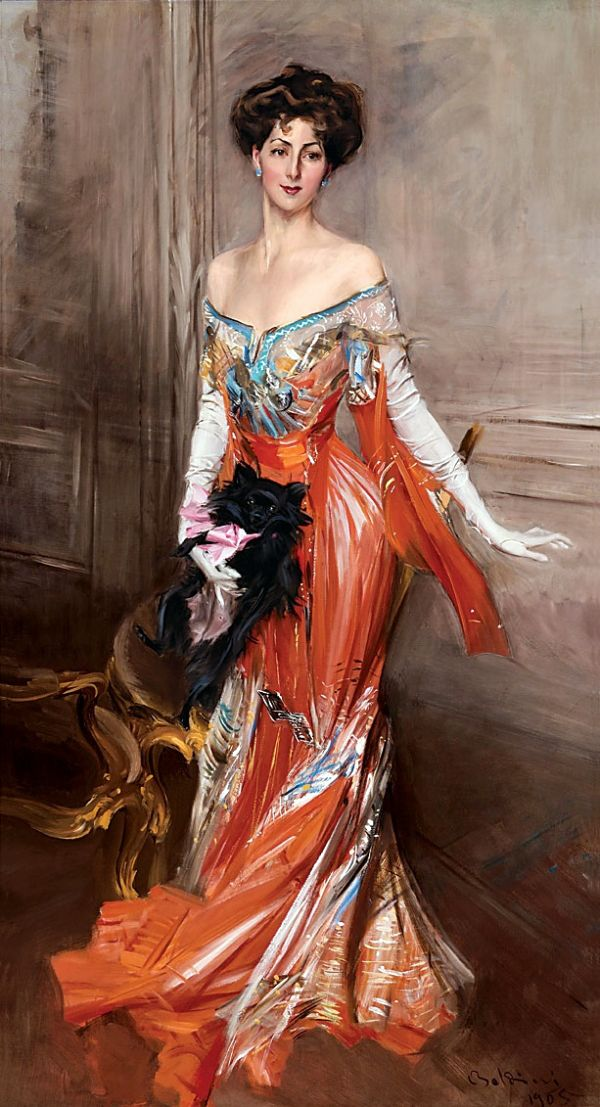
Fashionable lady of the era: portrait by Giovanni Boldini (1845–1931) showing Elizabeth Wharton Drexel in 1905.

The outfits worn by fashionable women during the Belle Époque (1871–1914) were strikingly similar to fashion pioneer Charles Worth’s styles. By the end of the 19th century, the horizons of the fashion industry had broadened, due to the more stable and independent lifestyles of well-off women and the practical clothes they demanded. However, the fashions of the Belle Époque still retained the elaborate, upholstered style of the 19th century. Belle époque’s use of different trimmings was all that distinguished the clothing from one season to the next.

Conspicuous waste and conspicuous consumption defined the fashions of the decade. Outfits made by couture designers of the time were extravagant, ornate, and painstakingly made. The S-Bend silhouette dominated fashion until 1908. The S-Bend corset thrust the chest forward into the mono-bosom. Padding, judicious placement of trim and, a particular posture, created the illusion of a "S" silhouette. Then, toward the end of the decade, Paul Poiret introduced designs that did not include a petticoat or a corset at all. This was a big change, as women's waists had been shaped by corsets since the Renaissance.

The Maison Redfern, founded by the English tailor John Redfern (1820–1895), was the first fashion house to offer women sportswear and tailored suits based on their male counterparts. Their practical and elegant garments soon became staples in wardrobes of well-dressed women.

== 1910s ==
During the early years of the 1910s the fashionable silhouette became much more lithe and fluid, and softer than in the 19th century. When the Ballets Russes performed Scheherazade in Paris in 1910, a craze for Orientalism ensued. The couturier Paul Poiret was one of the first designers to translate this into the fashion world. Poiret's clients were transformed into harem girls in flowing pantaloons, turbans, and vivid colors and geisha in exotic kimono. Poiret also devised the first outfit which women could put on without the help of a maid.

The Art Deco movement began to emerge at this time and its influence was evident in the designs of many couturiers. Simple felt hats, turbans, and clouds of tulle replaced the styles of headgear popular in the 19th century. The first real fashion shows were organized during this period, by Jeanne Paquin, one of the first female couturiers, who was also the first Parisian couturier to open foreign branches in London, Buenos Aires, and Madrid.

Two of the most influential fashion designers of the time were Jacques Doucet and Mariano Fortuny. Doucet excelled in layering pastel colors and his elaborate gossamer dresses suggested the Impressionist shimmers of reflected light. His distinguished customers never lost a taste for his fluid lines and flimsy, diaphanous materials. While obeying imperatives that left little to the imagination of the couturier, Doucet was nonetheless a designer of immense taste and discrimination, a role many have tried since, but rarely with Doucet's level of success.

The Venice-based designer Mariano Fortuny y Madrazo, was a curious figure, with very few parallels in any age. For his dress designs he conceived a special pleating process and new dyeing techniques. He gave the name Delphos to his long clinging sheath dresses that undulated with color. Each garment was made of a single piece of the finest silk, its unique color acquired by repeated immersions in dyes whose shades were suggestive of moonlight or of the watery reflections of the Venetian lagoon. Breton straw, Mexican cochineal, and indigo from the Far East were among the ingredients that Fortuny used. Among his many devotees were Eleonora Duse, Isadora Duncan, Cléo de Mérode, the Marchesa Casati, Émilienne d'Alençon, and Liane de Pougy.

Changes in dress during World War I were dictated more by necessity than fashion. As more and more women were forced to work, they demanded clothes that were better suited to their new activities. Social events had to be postponed in favor of more pressing work and the need to mourn the increasing numbers of dead, visits to the wounded, and the general gravity of the time meant that darker colors became the norm. A new monochrome look emerged that was unfamiliar to young women in comfortable circumstances. By 1915 fashionable skirts had risen above the ankle and, by 1920, to mid-calf.

For boys, clothes switched to being more neutral and plain, which did resemble some of the men's fashion during this era. Female infants during this decade wore loose-fitting dresses until the ages of two or three. After that age range, little girls shifted into wearing dresses with suits or skirts that were similar to women's skirts.

== Golden age of French fashion ==
The period between the two World Wars, often considered to be the Golden Age of French fashion, was one of great change and reformation. Haute couture found new clients in the ranks of film actresses, American heiresses, and the wives and daughters of wealthy industrialists.

=== 1920s ===
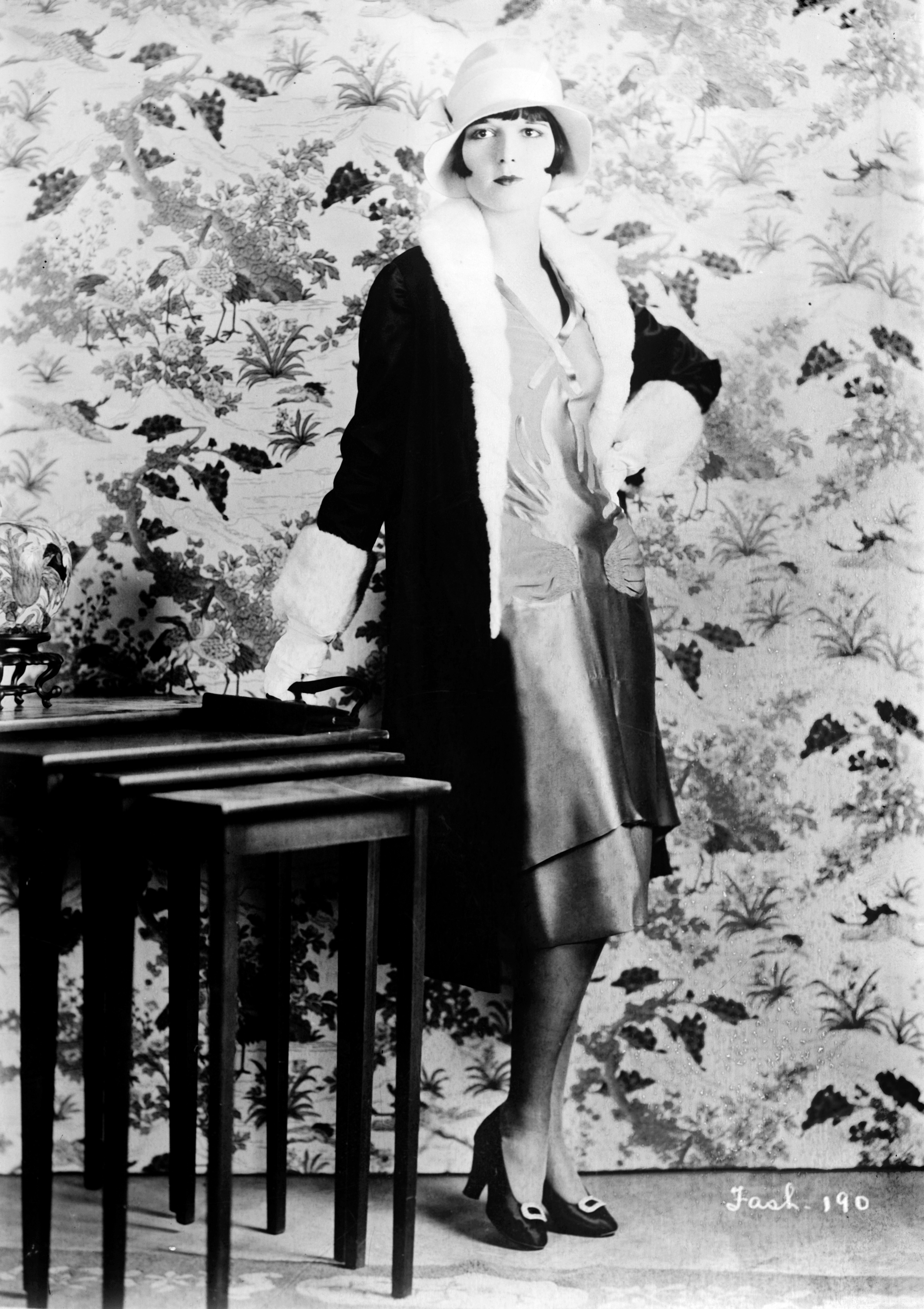
Fashionable Hollywood actress Louise Brooks

After the First World War, a radical change came about in fashion. Bouffant coiffures gave way to short bobs, dresses with long trains gave way to above-the-knee pinafores. Corsets were abandoned and women borrowed their clothes from the male wardrobe and chose to dress like boys. Although, at first, many couturiers were reluctant to adopt the new androgynous style, they embraced them wholeheartedly from around 1925. A bustless, waistless silhouette emerged and aggressive dressing-down was mitigated by feather boas, embroidery, and showy accessories. The flapper style (known to the French as the 'garçonne' look) became very popular among young women. The cloche hat was widely worn and sportswear became popular with both men and women, with designers like Jean Patou and Coco Chanel popularizing the sporty and athletic look.

The great couturière Coco Chanel was a major figure in fashion at the time, known as much for her magnetic personality as for her chic and progressive designs. Chanel helped popularize the bob hairstyle, the little black dress, and the use of jersey knit for women's clothing; she also elevated the status of costume jewelry and knitwear.

Two other prominent French designers of the 1920s were Jeanne Lanvin and Jean Patou. Jeanne Lanvin, who began her career as a milliner, made such beautiful outfits for her young daughter Marguerite that people started to ask for copies. Lanvin's name appears in the fashion yearbook from about 1901, however, it was in the 1920s that she reached the peak of her success. The Lanvin style embraced the look of the time, with its skillful use of complex trimmings, dazzling embroideries, and beaded decorations in light, clear, floral colors that eventually became a Lanvin trademark. By 1925 Lanvin produced many different products, including sportswear, furs, lingerie, men's fashion, and interior designs. Her global approach to fashion foreshadowed the schemes that all the large contemporary fashion houses would later adopt in their efforts to diversify.

The style of Jean Patou was never mainstream, but full of originality and characterized by a studied simplicity which was to win him fame, particularly in the American markets. Many of his garments, with their clean lines, geometric and Cubist motifs, and mixture of luxury and practicality, were designed to satisfy the new vogue for the outdoor life, and bore a remarkable similarity to modern sportswear. The most famous advocate of his style was Suzanne Lenglen, the legendary tennis champion.

In menswear, there was a growing mood of informality, among the Americans especially, which was mirrored in fashions that emphasized youthfulness and relaxation. In the past, there was a special outfit for every event in the well-dressed gentleman's day, but young men in the 1920s, no longer afraid to show their youthfulness, began to wear the same soft wool suit all day long. Short suit jackets replaced the old long jackets of the past which were now only worn for formal occasions. Men had a variety of sports clothes available to them, including sweaters and short pants, commonly known as knickers. For evening wear a short tuxedo was more fashionable than the tail-coat, which was now seen as somewhat old-fashioned. The London cut, with its slim lines, loose-fitting sleeves, and padded shoulders, perfected by the English tailor Scholte, was very popular.

Fair Isle patterns became very popular for both sexes. Heels, at the time, were often over two inches high and helped popularize the two-tone shoe. Salvatore Ferragamo and André Perugia were two of the most influential and respected designers in footwear. Many stars of silent film had a significant impact on fashion during the 1920s, including Louise Brooks, Gloria Swanson, and Colleen Moore. The lighthearted, forward-looking fashions of the 1920s gradually came to halt after the Wall Street crash of 1929, and succumbed to a more conservative style. While the flapper look persisted into 1930, it quickly disappeared afterward, although bell-shaped hats lasted through 1933.

Prior to the 1920s, dress for the youngest boys and girls was styled very similarly. Some children during this decade began to be distinguished by the (today) "traditional" colors of blue for boys and pink for girls.

=== 1930s ===
In the 1930s, as the public began to feel the effects of the Great Depression, many designers found that crises were not the time for experimentation. Fashion became more compromising, aspiring to preserve feminism's victories while rediscovering a subtle and reassuring elegance and sophistication. Overall, 1930s clothing was somber and modest, reflecting the difficult social and economic situation of the decade. Women's fashions moved away from the brash, daring style of the 1920s towards a more romantic, feminine silhouette. The waistline was restored, hemlines dropped to nearly ankle-length, there was renewed appreciation of the bust, and backless evening gowns, and soft, slim-fitting day dresses became popular. The female body was remodeled into a more neo-classical shape, and slim, toned, and athletic bodies came into vogue. The fashion for outdoor activities stimulated couturiers to manufacture what would today be referred to as "sportswear." The term "ready-to-wear" was not yet widely in use, but the boutiques described such clothes as being "for sport". In place of the bobbed flapper haircut, the standard women's hairstyle of the 1930s was a modest, short perm.

Two of the most prominent and influential fashion designers of the 1930s were Elsa Schiaparelli and Madeleine Vionnet. Elsa Schiaparelli showed her first collection in 1929 and was immediately hailed by the press as 'one of the rare innovators' of the day. With her exciting and inventive designs, Schiaparelli did not so much revolutionize fashion as shatter its foundations. The first pullover she displayed in her windows created a sensation: it was knitted in black with a trompe-l'œil white bow. Schiaparelli was a close friend of Christian Bérard, Jean Cocteau, and Salvador Dalí, who designed embroidery motifs for her and supplied inspiration for models like the desk suit with drawers for pockets, the shoe-shaped hat, the silk dresses painted with flies or lobsters. All of Paris thronged to her salon at 21 Place Vendôme as collection succeeded collection.

Madeleine Vionnet found her inspiration in ancient statues, creating timeless and beautiful gowns that would not look out of place on a Greek frieze. Queen of the bias cut (cutting diagonally across the fabric's lengthwise threads), she produced evening dresses that fitted the body without excessive elaboration or dissimulation, employing a flowing and elegant line. Her perfect draping of chiffon, silk, and Moroccan crêpe created a marvelously poised and sensual effect. The unparalleled success of Vionnet's cuts guaranteed her reputation right up to her retirement in 1939.

Mainbocher, the first American designer to live and work in Paris, was also influential, with his plain yet supremely elegant designs, often employing the bias cut pioneered by Vionnet. The luxury goods manufacturer Hermès began to sell handmade printed silk square scarves in the early 1930s, in addition to popularizing the zipper and many other practical innovations. Toward the end of the decade, women's fashions took on a somewhat more imposing and broad-shouldered silhouette, possibly influenced by Elsa Schiaparelli. Men's fashions continued the informal, practical trend that had dominated since the end of the First World War.

Around the 1930s, children's fashion started to truly diverge from designs for adults. One explanation for this shift is the idea that merchants started to expand children's fashion in hopes to increase their income with this secondary market. In addition, clothing designers started to perceive that children might have their own preferences, rather than adhering to the parents' tastes. For girls, extremely short dresses, puffed sleeves, and Peter Pan collars continued to hold popularity during the '30s. Meanwhile, sailor suits were popular for little boys. Typically, older boys' fashion consisted of flannel and wool suits, largely copying men's fashion.

== Mid-twentieth century ==
After World War II, Paris's reputation as the global center of fashion began to crumble. A new youth style emerged in the 1950s, changing the focus of fashion. In the West, the traditional divide between high society and the working class was challenged. In particular, a new young generation wanted to reap the benefits of a booming consumer society. Privilege became less blatantly advertised than in the past and differences were more glossed over. As the ancient European hierarchies were overturned, the external marks of distinction faded. By the time the first rockets were launched into space, Europe was more than ready to adopt a quality ready-to-wear garment along American lines—something to occupy the middle ground between off-the-peg and couture. This need was all the more pressing because increases in overhead and raw material costs were beginning to relegate handmade fashion to the sidelines. Meanwhile, rapidly developing new technologies made it increasingly easy to manufacture an ever-improving, high-quality product.

Faced with the threat of a factory-made, fashion-based product, Parisian fashion couture mounted its defenses, but to little effect. While the old world was taking its final bow, the changes in fashion were one of the most visible manifestations of the general shake-up in society. Before long, classes of women hitherto restricted to inferior substitutes to haute couture would enjoy a greatly enlarged freedom of choice. Dealing in far larger quantities, production cycles were longer than those of couture workshops, which meant that stylists planning their lines for the twice-yearly collections had to try to guess more than a year in advance what their customers would want. A new authority had taken over—that of the street, constituting a further threat to the dictatorship of couture.

=== 1940s ===
Many fashion houses closed during the occupation of Paris during World War II, including the Maison Vionnet and the Maison Chanel. Several designers, including Mainbocher, permanently relocated to New York City. In the enormous moral and intellectual re-education program undertaken by the French state, couture was not spared. In contrast to the stylish, liberated Parisienne, the Vichy regime promoted the model of the wife and mother—a robust, athletic young woman—a figure much more consistent with the new regime's political agenda. Meanwhile, Germany was taking possession of over half of what France produced, including high fashion, and was considering relocating French haute couture to Berlin and Vienna. The archives of the Chambre Syndicale de la Couture were seized, including, most consequentially, the client list. The point of all this was to break up a monopoly that supposedly threatened the dominance of the Third Reich.

Due to difficult times, hemlines crept upward in both evening wear and day wear, the latter of which was made using substitute materials whenever possible. From 1940 onward, fabric was needed for military personnel; to everyone else, it was rationed, with an allowance of no more than four meters (thirteen feet) of cloth was permitted to be used for a coat and a little over one meter (three feet) for a blouse. No belt could be over 3 centimeters (one and a half inches) wide. Everyone, from housewives to designers, was forced to re-use of old fabric or create new styles out of old garments. Haute couture did its best to keep its flag flying. Humor and frivolity became a popstar way of defying the occupying powers and couture survived. Although some have argued that the reason it endured was due to the patronage of the wives of wealthy Nazis, records reveal that, aside from the usual wealthy Parisiennes, it was an eclectic mix of the wives of foreign ambassadors, clients from the black market, and miscellaneous other patrons of the salons (among whom German women were but a minority) that kept the doors open at fashion houses such as Jacques Fath, Maggy Rouff, Marcel Rochas, Jeanne Lafaurie, Nina Ricci, and Madeleine Vramant.

Permed hairstyles remained standard, although during the '40s, this evolved into a bobbed roll along the lower part of the hairline.

During the Occupation, the only true way for a woman to flaunt her extravagance or add color to a drab outfit was to wear a hat. In this period, hats were often made of scraps of material that would otherwise have been thrown away, including bits of paper and wood shavings. Among the most innovative milliners of the time were Pauline Adam, Simone Naudet, Rose Valois, and Le Monnier.

Paris's isolated situation in the 1940s enabled Americans to fully use the ingenuity and creativity of their own designers. During the Second World War, Vera Maxwell presented outfits constituted of plain, simply cut coordinates, and introduced innovations to men's work clothes. Bonnie Cashin transformed boots into a major fashion accessory, and, in 1944, began the production of original and imaginative sportswear. Claire McCardell, Anne Klein, and Cashin formed a remarkable trio of women who laid the foundations of American sportswear, ensuring that ready-to-wear was not considered a mere second best, but an elegant and comfortable way for modern women to dress.

In the War Years, the zoot suit (and in France the zazou suit) became popular among young men.

Many actresses of the time, including Rita Hayworth, Katharine Hepburn, and Marlene Dietrich, had a significant impact on popular fashion.

The couturier Christian Dior created a tidal wave with his first collection in February 1947. The collection contained dresses with accentuated busts, tiny (or "wasp") waists, and extravagantly full skirts, emphasizing the feminine hourglass figure in a manner very similar to the style of the Belle Époque. The lavish use of fabric and the feminine elegance of the designs appealed to post-war clientele and ensured Dior's meteoric rise to fame. The sheer sophistication of the style incited the all-powerful editor of the American Harper's Bazaar, Carmel Snow, to exclaim 'This is a new look!'.

With World War II and with some lack of textiles, many designs for children's clothing returned to simple and plain styles. High demand for fabric persisted past the end of the war in 1945. Children's clothing was also rationed during WWII and after, depending on the country.

=== 1950s ===
The 1950s sparked a revival of tradition in fashion. A whole society which, in the 1920s and 1930s, had greatly believed in progress, was now much more circumspect. Despite the fact that women had the right to vote, to work, and to drive their own cars, they chose to wear dresses made of opulent materials, with corseted waists and swirling skirts to mid-calf. As fashion looked to the past, haute couture experienced something of a revival and spawned a myriad of star designers who profited hugely from the rapid growth of the media.

Throughout the 1950s, although it would be for the last time, women around the world continued to submit to the trends of Parisian haute couture. Three of the most prominent of the Parisian couturiers of the time were Cristóbal Balenciaga, Hubert de Givenchy, and Pierre Balmain. The frugal prince of luxury, Cristóbal Balenciaga Esagri made his fashion debut in the late 1930s. However, it was not until the post-war years that the full scale of the inventiveness of this highly original designer became evident. In 1951, he totally transformed the silhouette, broadening the shoulders and removing the waist. In 1955, he designed the tunic dress, which later developed into the chemise dress of 1957. And eventually, in 1959, his work culminated in the Empire line, with high-waisted dresses and coats cut similarly to kimono. His mastery of fabric design and creation defied belief. Balenciaga is also notable as one of the few couturiers in fashion history who could use their own hands to design, cut, and sew the models which symbolized the height of his artistry.

Hubert de Givenchy opened his first couture house in 1952 and created a sensation with his separates, which could be mixed and matched at will. Most renowned was his Bettina blouse made from shirting, which was named after his top model. Soon, boutiques were opened in Rome, Zurich, and Buenos Aires. A man of immense taste and discrimination, he was, perhaps more than any other designer of the period, an integral part of the world whose understated elegance he helped to define.

Pierre Balmain opened his own salon in 1945. It was in a series of collections named 'Jolie Madame' that he experienced his greatest success, from 1952 onwards. Balmain's vision of the elegantly dressed woman was particularly Parisian and was typified by the tailored glamour of the "New Look", with its ample bust, narrow waist, and full skirts, by mastery of cut and imaginative assemblies of fabrics in subtle color combinations. His sophisticated clientele was equally at home with luxurious elegance, simple tailoring, and a more natural look. Along with his haute couture work, the talented businessman pioneered a ready-to-wear range called Florilege and also launched a number of highly successful perfumes.

Also notable is the return of Coco Chanel (who detested the "New Look") to the fashion world. Following the closure of her salons in the war years, in 1954, aged over seventy, she staged a comeback and on 5 February she presented a collection that contained a whole range of ideas that would be adopted and copied by women all over the world: her famous little braided suit with gold chains, shiny costume jewelry, silk blouses in colors that matched the suit linings, sleek tweeds, monogrammed buttons, flat black silk bows, boaters, quilted bags on chains, and evening dresses and furs that were marvels of simplicity.

Despite being a high fashion designer, American-born Mainbocher also designed military and civilian service uniforms. In 1952, he redesigned the Women Marines service uniform combining femininity with functionality. Previous redesigns include uniforms for the WAVES (Women Accepted for Volunteer Emergency Service) in 1942, and uniform designs for the Girl Scouts of the USA and the American Red Cross in 1948.

Dior's "New Look" (that premiered in 1947) revived the popularity of girdles and the all-in-one corselettes. In the early 1950s, many couture houses used the interest in "foundationwear" to launch their own lines, soon after many lingerie manufacturers began to build their own brands. In 1957, Jane Russell wore the "Cantilever" bra that was scientifically designed by Howard Hughes to maximize a voluptuous look. The invention of Lycra (originally called "Fibre K") in 1959 revolutionized the underwear industry and was quickly incorporated into every aspect of lingerie.

After the war, the American look (which consisted of broad shoulders, floral ties, straight-legged pants, and shirts with long pointed collars, often worn hanging out rather than tucked in) became very popular among men in Europe. Certain London manufacturers ushered in a revival of Edwardian elegance in men's fashion, adopting a tight-fitting retro style that was intended to appeal to traditionalists. This look, originally aimed at the respectable young man about town, was translated into popular fashion as the Teddy boy style. The Italian look, popularized by Caraceni, Brioni, and Cifonelli, was taken up by an entire generation of elegant young lovers, on both sides of the Atlantic. Plaid was very common in 1950s men's fashion, both for shirts and suits, along with the "ducktail" haircut, which was often viewed as a symbol of teenage rebellion and banned in schools.

During the second half of the 1950s, there was a general move towards less formal clothing, especially among men's fashion. The fedora and Homburg hat, as well as trench coats, disappeared from widespread use (this trend had already begun some years earlier on the more informal West Coast of the US) after having been standard parts of menswear since the 1920s.

The designers of Hollywood created a particular type of glamour for the stars of American film, and outfits worn by the likes of Marilyn Monroe, Lauren Bacall, or Grace Kelly were widely copied. Quantitatively speaking, a costume worn by an actress in a Hollywood movie would have a much bigger audience than the photograph of a dress designed by a couturier illustrated in a magazine read by no more than a few thousand people. Without even trying to keep track of all the Paris styles, its costume designers focused on their own version of classicism, which was meant to be timeless, flattering, and photogenic. Using apparently luxurious materials, such as sequins, chiffon, and fur, the clothes were very simply cut, often including some memorable detail, such as a low-cut back to a dress which was only revealed when the actress turned her back from the camera or some particularly stunning accessory. The most influential and respected designers of Hollywood from the 1930s to the 1950s were Edith Head, Orry-Kelly, William Travilla, Jean Louis, Travis Banton, and Gilbert Adrian. Everyday women's clothing during the decade consisted of long coats, hats with small veils, and leather gloves. Knee-length dresses combined with pearl necklaces, which were made instantly popular by First Lady Mamie Eisenhower. Short, permed hair was the standard women's hairstyle of the period.

By the end of the decade mass-manufactured, off-the-peg clothing had become much more popular than in the past, granting the general public unprecedented access to fashionable styles.

Girls during the 1950s were starting to be introduced to poodle skirts along with matching accessories. Poodle skirts were made from a felt fabric with a wide swing and typically one color with a design transferred on the fabric. Matching accessories included same patterned jewelry, purses, and/or hats. Meanwhile, boys commonly dressed in patterned and colorful collared shirts. The 1950s is when clothing started to become popular in printing media, such as newspapers and magazines. With clothing and printing starting to mix together, it helped share fashion trends globally and in a timely manner.

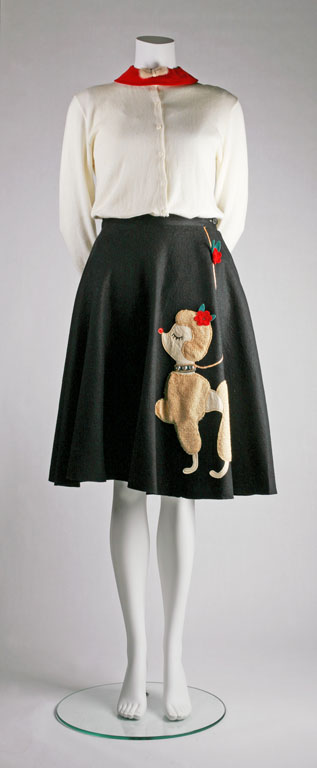
Example image of a poodle skirt.

=== 1960s ===
Until the 1960s Paris was considered to be the center of fashion throughout the world. However, between 1960 and 1969 a radical shake-up occurred in the fundamental structure of fashion. From the 1960s onward, there would never be just one single, prevailing trend or fashion but a great plethora of possibilities, indivisibly linked to all the various influences in other areas of people's lives. Prosperity and the emergence of a distinct teenager culture, combined with the counterculture movement, would all have major effects on fashion.

After 30 years of conservative clothing styles, the '60s saw a kind of throwback to the 1920s with women once again adopting a childlike look with bobbed haircuts and progressively less modest clothing. At the start of the decade, skirts were knee-length but steadily became shorter and shorter until the mini-skirt emerged in 1965. By the end of the decade they had shot well above the stocking top, making the transition to tights inevitable.

Many of the radical changes in fashion developed in the streets of London, with such gifted designers as Mary Quant (known for launching the mini skirt) and Barbara Hulanicki (the founder of the legendary boutique Biba). Paris also had its share of new and revolutionary designers, including Pierre Cardin (known for his visionary and skillfully cut designs), André Courrèges (known for his futuristic outfits and for launching the mini skirt along with Mary Quant), Yves Saint Laurent (known for his revolutionary yet elegant fashions), and Emanuel Ungaro (known for his imaginative use of color and bold baroque contrasts). In the United States, Rudi Gernreich (known for his avant-garde and futuristic designs) and James Galanos (known for his luxurious ready-to-wear) were also reaching a young audience. The main outlets for these new young fashion designers were small boutiques, selling outfits that were not exactly 'one-offs', but were made in small quantities in a limited range of sizes and colors. However, not all designers took well to the new style and mood. In 1965, Coco Chanel mounted a rearguard action against the exposure of the knee and Balenciaga resolutely continued to produce feminine and conservative designs.

The basic shape and style of the time were simple, neat, trim, and colorful. Hats had already begun their decline in the previous decade and were now almost completely extinct except for special occasions. Lower kitten heels were a pretty substitute for stilettos. Pointed toes gave way to chisel-shaped toes in 1961 and to an almond toe in 1963. Flat boots also became popular with very short dresses in 1965 and eventually, they rose up the leg and reached the knee.

The '60s for the first time saw a widespread assortment of popular hairstyles, including bobs, pageboy cuts, and beehives.

Two notable and influential designers in the 1960s were Emilio Pucci and Paco Rabanne. Emilio Pucci's sportswear designs and prints inspired by op art, psychedelia, and medieval heraldic banners earned him a reputation that extended far beyond the circles of high society. His sleek shift dresses, tunics, and beachwear created a 'Puccimania' that was all part of a movement to liberate the female form and his designs are today synonymous with the 1960s. Francisco Rabaneda Cuervo (later Paco Rabanne) opened his first couture house in 1966 and, from the start, produced resolutely modern designs. Rather than using conventional dress materials, he created garments from aluminium, Rhodoid, and pieces of scrap metal. His designs, as well as being experimental, were also closely in tune with what modern adventurous young women wanted to wear. Among his innovations are the seamless dress made, after much experiment, by spraying vinyl chloride onto a mold, and the low-budget disposable dress made of paper and nylon thread. Rabanne was also the first fashion designer to use black models, which very nearly resulted in his dismissal from the Chambre Syndicale de la Couture Parisienne. The success of his perfume Calandre helped support the less profitable areas of his work, while his utopianism assured him a unique position in the conservative world of haute couture.

The principal change in menswear in the 1960s was in the weight of the fabric used. The choice of materials and the method of manufacture produced a suit that, because it was lighter in weight, had a totally different look, with a line that was closer to the natural shape of the body, causing men to look at their figures more critically. The spread of jeans served to accelerate a radical change in the male wardrobe. Young men grew their hair down to their collars and added a touch of color, and even floral motifs, to their shirts. The polo neck never succeeded in replacing the tie, but the adoption of the workman's jacket in rough corduroy, and especially the mao jacket proved to be more than simply a political statement. A few futuristic rumblings were set off by Pierre Cardin and Andre Courrèges, but the three-piece suit still survived intact.

In the early 1960s there were influential 'partnerships' of celebrities and high-fashion designers, most famously Audrey Hepburn with Givenchy, and Jackie Kennedy with Oleg Cassini. Also, many models had a very profound effect on fashion, most notably Twiggy, Veruschka, Jean Shrimpton. Early in the decade, culottes were in style and the bikini finally came into fashion in 1963. The hippie and psychedelic movements late in the decade also had a strong influence on clothing styles, including bell-bottom jeans (designed by the English tailor Tommy Nutter, from his Savoy store), tie-dye and batik fabrics, as well as paisley prints.

Children's clothing, often more conservative than design for adults, during this era saw less change than adult clothing. For girls, white ankle socks, Peter Pan collars, and Mary–Jane shoes remained popular. Other trends that began to arise included plaids and bright florals, brighter colors, and baby-doll dresses. Girls' fashion did follow women's fashion regarding accessories such as tights and some shoes. Boys' fashion included denim, plaid, corduroy pants, and cuffed jeans. It wasn't until the late years of the 1960s that boys' fashion saw plaid and striped blazers used for formal wear. Neither girls' nor boys' fashion significantly followed adult fashion with the bell-bottomed jeans and the "hippie" style. The 1960s were also the years that beauty pageants for children took off. The creation of the beauty pageants for children brought more attention to children's fashion as its own design concern from adult fashion.

=== 1970s ===
Nicknamed the 'me' decade; 'please yourself' was the catchphrase of the 1970s. Some saw it as the end of good taste. The decade began with a continuation of the hippie look of the late 1960s, with kaftans, Indian scarves, and floral-print tunics. Jeans remained frayed and bell-bottomed, tie dye was still popular, and the fashion for unisex mushroomed. An immense movement claiming civil rights for black people combined with the influence of soul music from the USA created a nostalgia for Africa and African culture. A radical chic emerged, influenced by the likes of James Brown, Diana Ross, Angela Davis, and the Black Panthers, in everything from afro hairstyles to platform soles. During the 1970s brands greatly increased their share of the international market. Hems began dropping in 1974 to below the knee until finally reaching the lower mid-calf in 1977 and shoulder lines were dropped. After 1975, fashions came to be dominated by the "disco look" which included feathered women's haircuts and on men, the three-piece leisure suit. Bell-bottomed pants would remain popular throughout the entire decade.

Perhaps the two most innovative fashion designers in 1970s France were Kenzo Takada and Sonia Rykiel. The undisputed star of Parisian fashion in the 1970s, Kenzo, drew his inspiration from all over the world, mixing Western and Oriental folk influences with a fantastic joie de vivre and an instinctive understanding of what his young customers wanted. With his fluid lines, unusual prints, clever accessories, and finery that was hitherto unprecedented in ready-to-wear, he turned the fashion world upside down. The queen of figure-hugging knits, in 1974, Sonia Rykiel, designed her first pullovers with reversed seams. However, she also created a whole range of clothes that were individual and yet could be worn almost anywhere. The Rykiel style, dominated by fluid knitted garments, dark blacks, rhinestones, long boa-like scarves, and little crocheted hats, conquered the American market, and even to this day, Rykiel is considered by many Americans as the successor of Chanel.

Because of punk, London retained a considerable degree of influence over fashion, most significantly in the boutiques of the King's Road, where Vivienne Westwood's boutique, SEX, which opened in 1971, blew with the prevailing wind. This temple of British iconoclasm centered on fetishistic accessories and ranges of clothing in which black rubber and steel studs were the external signs of underlying sadism. Postmodernist and iconoclastic in essence the punk movement was a direct reaction to the economic situation during the economic depression of the period, the vehicle for a hatred that was more visceral than political. Punk had at its heart a manifesto of creation through disorder. With their ripped T-shirts, Native American hairstyles, Doc Martens, bondage trousers, and chains, the punks exported an overall feeling of disgust around the globe.

Another popular British style was the resolutely unmodern, feminine, countrified style of clothing popularized by Laura Ashley, which consisted of long flounced skirts and high-necked blouses in traditional floral prints, worn with crocheted shawls. Laura Ashley started out running a small business in Wales in the mid-1960s and the company continued to expand until the accidental death of its owner in 1985. Laura Ashley was not the only designer to look nostalgically to the past. Fashions based on the 1920s, 30s, 40s, and 50s were popular throughout much of the decade, with Hollywood films like The Godfather and The Great Gatsby, and numerous exhibitions on costume history at the Metropolitan Museum of Art in New York increasing their popularity. In Japan, the boutiques of Tokyo's fashionable Harajuku district sold many reworked versions of traditional British and American looks.

In the United States, the general trend in fashion was towards simplification and longer skirts, although many women reacted negatively to the midi-length, which they felt to be aging. Pants, on the other hand, earned unanimous approval. Jeans profited most from becoming an accepted part of the American fashion scene in the 1970s, their newfound respectability deriving from their inclusion in collections under the heading of sportswear. The new stars of American ready-to-wear adapted the best of what they learned from Europe to the massive American clothing industry. Calvin Klein and Ralph Lauren rose from anonymity more or less simultaneously to tackle the question of designing clothes for the men and women of a new world. Two opposing movements dominated fashion in the U.S. during the 1970s. On one hand, there was the tailored, unisex look; on the other hand, a fluid, unstructured style with a strong feeling of 1930s glamor. The most influential American designer of the time, Roy Halston Frowick (known simply as Halston), belonged to the latter category. Acquiring celebrity status on the New York scene, his particular talent was in reconciling the made-to-measure garment for the special occasion with concepts of comfort, naturalness, and relaxation. With his kaftans, shirtwaisters, djellabas, ultra-lightweight shift dresses, and tunics worn over shorts and wide-legged pants, he was an icon of the era, and a regular visitor at the VIP room of the Studio 54 after its opening in 1977.

Geoffrey Beene, praised for his elegant and sophisticated cuts and his use of black and white, was at his most successful in the radically simplified designs at which he excelled. His smart little dresses and well-cut suits in jersey, flannel, and wool were instrumental in discouraging American women from over-accessorizing. Bill Blass, who launched his own range in 1962, developed the habit of traveling all over the United States to hear for himself what his customers desired. One of the most popular designers of the time, he was almost too successful in fulfilling his customers' wishes. His disciplined style and workmanship were particularly favored by businesswomen and the wives of senior executives. Betsey Johnson started out designing for the boutique Paraphernalia. Using vinyl and metallic fabrics and putting emphasis on wit, imagination, and independence, she brought an unprecedented spirit of irreverence to New York in the 1970s.

In popular fashion, the glam rock style of clothing, worn by such rock performers as David Bowie and Marc Bolan, was very influential, particularly in the United Kingdom. The designer Elio Fiorucci had a very similar look. His boutique in Milan sold such things as brightly colored rubber boots, plastic daisy sandals, fake fur, and Pop Art-inspired jackets.

During the 1970s a new generation of menswear boutiques sprang up, aiming to change the decor, rituals, and customer base of a traditionally 'difficult' trade. To sell fashionable clothes to a young man at the end of the 1960s was still, in many circles, tantamount to questioning his masculinity. Men's appearance changed more in the 1970s than it had done in a whole century. Many of the fashion designers who revolutionized the male look owed a lot of their innovations to Pierre Cardin: narrow shoulders, tight-fitting lines, no tie, no interfacing, zip-up boiler suits, waisted jackets or tunics, sometimes no shirt. Work clothes supplied inspiration for a less formal style, encouraging designers to look beyond the traditional suit and, for example, adopt a unisex look or investigate the massive supply of second-hand clothes. Sometimes this kind of male dressing-down, often denounced as 'hippie', gained formal recognition as a deliberate look. At certain other times, as part of a retro movement, designers introduced a revival of 1930s elegance. The unearthing of old military clothing, preferably khaki and from the United States; English-style shoes; Oxford shirts; immaculate T-shirts; tweed jackets with padded shoulders; brightly colored V-neck sweaters; cashmere-printed scarves draped around the neck all imposed a certain uniformity on the casual beatnik look of the male wardrobe at the end of the 1970s.

Also significant are the developments in Italian fashion that happened during the period. In the course of the 1970s, as a result of its ready-to-wear industry, Milan confirmed its status as second only to Paris as a center of international fashion. The 'alta moda' preferred Rome, the base of the couturiers Valentino, Capucci, and Schön. Capitalizing on the dominant trend of anti-fashion Italy offered a glamor that had nothing to do with the dictates of Parisian haute couture. While profiting from a clearly defined style, Italian fashion was luxurious and easy to wear. The two most influential Italian fashion designers of the time were probably Giorgio Armani and Nino Cerruti. Giorgio Armani produced his first collection for women in 1975. From the outset, the line was dynamic, urban, and understated, androgynous in inspiration. Armani offered a restrained style that greatly appealed to the increasing population of women who now had access to the world of work and occupied progressively more senior positions within it. This was only the beginning of a tremendous career, which came to fruition in 1981 when Emporio Armani was launched. In 1957 Nino Cerruti opened the menswear boutique Hitman in Milan. A man of taste and discernment, in 1976 he presented his first collection for women. Two years later, he launched his first perfume. In linking the career of a successful industrialist with that of a high-quality designer, Cerruti occupied a unique position in Italian ready-to-wear.

During the 1970s, children's fashion followed adult trends more closely. The most significant was a decrease in distinction between gendered clothing. Both genders' fashion was filled with brightly colored trousers, more plain t-shirts, and jeans. Girls' fashion did differ from women's fashion with the idea that little girls still wore minidresses and skirts earlier in this decade, while boys' fashion was starting to become populated with casual sportswear.

== Late twentieth century ==
During the late 20th century fashions began to criss-cross international boundaries with rapidity. Popular Western styles were adopted all over the world, and many designers from outside of the West had a profound impact on fashion. Synthetic materials such as Lycra/spandex, and viscose became widely used, and fashion, after two decades of looking to the future, once again turned to the past for inspiration.

=== 1980s ===
The society of the 1980s no longer criticized itself as consumerist, but was, instead, interested in 'the spectacle'. The self-conscious image of the decade changed the fashion industry, which had never been quite so à la mode. Fashion shows were transfigured into media-saturated spectaculars and frequently televised, taking high priority in the social calendar. Appearance was related to performance, which was of importance to a whole generation of young urban professionals, whose desire to look the part related to a craving for power. The way in which men and women associated with the latest styles was no more a matter of passive submission. Disco music rapidly fell out of favor as the decade began, along with its associated clothing styles. By 1982, the last traces of 1970s fashion were gone.

During the 1980s the mullet became the standard men's haircut and women sported large, square-cut perms; although there were many variations of both. Jumpsuits became a popular element of female clothing and on men, skinny neckties and wraparound sunglasses. Aerobics were also in vogue, causing Spandex leggings and headbands to be in style.

One French fashion designer who best defined the look of the period was Thierry Mugler. He was influenced by his career in the theater. He produced fashion designs that combined Hollywood retro and futurism. Mugler created dresses with rounded hips, sharply accentuated shoulders, and a galactic heroine tone. They were successful and signified the end of the hippy era and its unstructured silhouette.

Azzedine Alaia also influenced the silhouette of the 1980s woman. He used many techniques that had previously been known only to haute couture. He experimented with many new and underused materials, such as spandex and viscose. The finish, simplicity, and sexiness of Alaia's look made women of every generation identify with his seductive style. During the 1980s, he was held in high regard by other members of his profession.

Also creating designs very typical of the era, were Claude Montana and Christian Lacroix. Claude Montana created imposing, broad-shouldered designs, often made of leather, that would not have looked out of place in the futuristic universe of Thierry Mugle. Christian Lacroix, sent shock waves through the world of haute couture, with his flounced skirts, embroidered corselets, bustles, and polka-dotted crinolines.

Chantel Thomas, won a devoted following for her underwear and evening gowns that looked like nightdresses.

Guy Paulin was one of the first designers to promote a severe, plain, and uncluttered look. His garments were classical in their proportions and made for comfort and simplicity, with their harmonious lines reinforced by a subtle palette of colors and fine materials. Under his own name, Joseph, he designed luxurious knitwear along classic lines, creating loose, sexy garments in neutral colors.

In 1981, Carolina Herrera, launched a series of collections aimed at women like herself, featuring impeccably cut clothes of high quality and attractive evening dresses.

Japanese designers such as Rei Kawakubo and Yohji Yamamoto offered a look that marked a total break from the fashion image of the time. Flat shoes, no make-up, reserve, modesty, and secrecy were the hallmarks of this modern look. Eventually, they began to include details from the fashions of the past. Europe's ancient sites were revisited by these anarchists of fashion, influencing the shape of clothes, at the end of the 20th-century.

In American fashion, the seductive, clinging style of Donna Karan and the casual sophistication of Ralph Lauren were very influential.

A star of the New York social scene, Donna Karan brought a very personal and feminine approach to the severe, sober-colored, casual look that dominated American ready-to-wear. She created her own label in 1984. Her designs were popular among active urban women who appreciated the understated luxury of her clothes.

In 1971, Ralph Lauren opened a boutique for both men and women in Beverly Hills. His aristocratic style at prices the average American could afford created a sensation. His fashions endorsed a classic look that had been adopted for an active life. He soon became number one of in American ready-to-wear. Lauren was equally successful with his sportswear and jeans, which allowed him to reach the widest possible range of social classes and age groups.

Central to the success of a new wave of American sportswear was the Perry Ellis label, established in 1978. They used color and natural fibers in elegant variations of basic fashion staples. Norma Kamali, with her short skirts made of sweatshirts, leotards, headbands, and leg warmers, made jogging look fashionable. Kamali also created the popular 'rah-rah skirt'. Also notable is the extreme popularity of the Adidas sports label, which achieved an incredible level of street cred in the 1980s, inciting the hip hop group Run DMC to release the single 'My Adidas' in 1986. The legendary shoe designer Manolo Blahnik also rose to fame during the 1980s.

The multiplicity of trends that bloomed during the 80s were curtailed by the economic recession that set in at the beginning of the 1990s, largely destroying the optimistic mood that is so advantageous to the fashion industry.

Bright colors were popular during the 1980s for both boys and girls. The bold colors have been explained as a break from earlier decades and following trends of pop culture. Celebrities such as Madonna and Michael Jackson were known to wear bold colors on their clothing. Children's fashion generally followed teenage and adult styles, including baggy sweaters and acid stone-washed jeans. The 1980s were also a time when it was deemed more acceptable in society for children and teenagers to purchase their own clothing.

=== 1990s ===
In the 1990s it was no longer the done thing to follow fashion slavishly, a sharp contrast to the highly a la mode 1970s and 1980s. The phobia of being underdressed was finally completely displaced by the fear of overdressing. Fashion in the 1990s united around a new standard, minimalism, and styles of stark simplicity became the vogue. Despite the best efforts of a few designers to keep the flag for pretty dresses flying, by the end of the decade the notion of ostentatious finery had virtually disappeared. As well as the styling of the product, its promotion in the media became crucial to its success and image. The financial pressures of the decade had a devastating effect on the development of new talent and lessened the autonomy enjoyed by more established designers.

Fashion at the end of the 20th century tackled themes that fashion had not previously embraced. These themes included rape, disability, religious violence, death, and body modification. There was a dramatic move away from the sexy styles aimed at the glamorous femme fatale of the 1980s, and many designers, taken with a vision of romantic poverty, adopted the style of the poverty-stricken waif, dressed in a stark, perversely sober palette, with a face devoid of make-up. Clothes by ready-to-wear retailers such as The Gap, Banana Republic, and Eddie Bauer came to the forefront of fashion, managing to tap into the needs of women who simply wanted comfortable, wearable clothes. Retro clothing inspired by the 1960s and 1970s was popular for much of the 1990s.

The famous Italian fashion house, Gucci was created in 1921, by Guccio Gucci and was originally a firm that sold luxury leather goods. Under Guccio Gucci's children, by the end of the 1960s the label had expanded to include a plethora of products with a distinctly Latin glamor. However, only in the 1990s, when the Gucci heirs gave up control of the company to Invest Corp., who planned to turn the business around, did it truly begin to enjoy the kind of success it enjoys in the present day. Employing an unknown designer, Tom Ford, as design director in 1994, the fashion house was endowed with great prestige, as Ford triggered a tidal wave with his chic and shocking collections, perfumes for men and women, revamped boutiques, and advertising campaigns. In 1998 Gucci is named "European Company of the year" by European Business Press Federation. Today it is the second biggest-selling fashion brand (after LVMH) worldwide with US$7 billion worldwide of revenue in 2006 according to BusinessWeek magazine.

In the 1990s the designer label Prada became a true creative force in the fashion industry. The Milanese company was first established in 1923, two years after Gucci, and like Gucci, it was a firm that sold high-quality shoes and leather. It was until the 1980s that Miuccia Prada, the niece of the company's founder, began to produce ready-to-wear fashion, gaining fame for her subtle, streamlined, yet unquestionably luxurious style, that catered for the privileged young woman who prefers understatement to flamboyant extravagance.

In America three of the most influential fashion designers of the time were Michael Kors, Marc Jacobs, and Calvin Klein. Michael Kors set up his own business in 1980. However, it was not until the 1990s that the designer reached the peak of his popularity. His knowledge and consciousness of trends enabled him to produce simple well-cut garments, whose sophistication and elegance appealed to a whole new breed of wealthy American customers drawn to the new vogue for minimalist chic. Marc Jacobs is one of the most notable American designers of the period in that, unlike many American fashion designers in the past, he was not so much the co-ordinator of a mass-produced garment as a designer in the European sense of the word. One of the most promising talents in the fashion industry at the time, the LVMH (Louis Vuitton-Moet Henessy) group offered him the job of designing a line of ready-to-wear to complement the de-luxe products of luggage specialist Louis Vuitton in the late 1990s. One of the first fashion designers to anticipate the globalization of world markets, the already well-known designer Calvin Klein started to market his fashions, perfumes, and accessories not only right across the US but also in Europe and Asia, achieving an unequaled success. A brilliant artistic director, Klein used carefully constructed advertisements containing images tinted with eroticism to promote his sophisticatedly functional mass-produced designs, which won massive popularity among the urban youth of the 1990s.

The group of designers known as the 'Antwerp Six' (so named because all of them were graduates of the Royal Academy of Fine Arts in Antwerp), who first emerged in the 1980s, came to prominence in the 1990s. Three of the most influential of the group were Ann Demeulemeester, Dries van Noten, and Walter Van Beirendonck. Ann Demeulemeester, from her first collection in 1991, demonstrated a great deal of confidence and inventiveness. Naturally inclined to understatement, she built her designs on contradictions, introducing contrasting elements into her fluid and streamlined fashions, which appealed to women who dressed, above all, to please themselves. The work of Dries van Noten was founded on a solid mastery of the art of tailoring, to which the young designer added discreet touches of fantasy in a highly personal style. Managing to be both classical and original, his fashions appealed to those who preferred to express their individuality rather than slavishly follow trends. Walter Van Beirendonck, who erupted onto the fashion scene in 1995, produced decidedly futuristic designs under his label W & LT (Wild and Lethal Trash). Deliberately using fabrics developed by the very latest technologies, in violently contrasting colors, he produced clothes that were full of erotic and sadomasochistic references, touched with caustic adolescent humor. His highly distinctive approach related to a resurgence of anti-fashion, but this time an anti-fashion with nothing in the least ethnic about its origins, instead based on science fiction that provided the inspiration for displays of such high-spirited provocation.

In Italy, Gianni Versace, with his brilliant, sexy, and colorful designs, and Dolce & Gabbana, with their superfeminine and fantastical style, broke away from the serious and sober-minded fashions that dominated during much of the 1990s. The British designer Vivienne Westwood produced many influential and popular collections in the early 1990s, which included outfits inspired by 18th-century courtesans and the Marquis de Sade, with rounded hips, corsets, and platform heels. The London-based designer Rifat Ozbek was also popular, particularly in New York and Milan. His youthful style, which mixed references to India, Africa, and his native Turkey with clever takes on historical clothing, was reminiscent of hippest nightclubs and the more outrageous street fashions of the time. Rap music was a prominent influence on popular and street fashion during the early and mid-1990s. Followers of hip hop adopted huge baggy jeans, similar to those worn in American prisons, with big patterned shirts and heavy black shoes. The sports label Nike had great popularity, and materials such as Lycra/spandex were increasingly used for sportswear. Increasing eco-awareness and animal rights made even top couture houses such as Chanel introduce fake fur and natural fibers into their collections.

Baggy jeans, loose shirts, and layers were popular with boys in the 1990s. Fashion design for girls was similar to that for boys, but with more variation in flannels and jeans. Both boys and girls had styles that were influenced by adults—for example, sportwear mixed with casual wear was trendy for all ages.

== 21st century ==
=== 2000s ===
Fashion in the 2000s was characterized by a combination of vintage styles, global influences, and trends associated with music and popular culture. Hip-hop fashion was widely adopted by young people, while indie-inspired styles gained popularity later. Celebrities also influenced clothing trends through their appearances in magazines, music videos, and public events.

Globalization contributed to the spread of clothing styles from different regions, including elements of Middle Eastern and Asian dress in Western fashion. The decade also saw increased attention to environmentally friendly and ethically produced clothing, including recycled and secondhand fashion.

Many trends from the mid and late 1990s continued into the early 2000s. Later in the decade, fashion increasingly incorporated styles inspired by the 1960s, 1970s, and 1980s.

Children's fashion during the 2000s was at times influenced/inspired by the companies, Disney and Nickelodean. Bold colors with patterned matching outfits became very popular among girl children and teenagers. Meanwhile for boy children and teenagers, khaki pants, baggy jeans, and cargo shorts were typically worn with either polos or graphic t-shirts. Later in this decade, layering of shirts became more popular. Children took note of what adults or teenagers wore and could use their judgment of whether the type of clothing was formal or casual according to one study.

=== 2010s ===
The fashions of the 2010s were defined by nostalgia, the mainstreaming of sub cultural aesthetics, and the growing influence of digital platforms on fashion cycles. Overarching trends of the decade included hipster fashion, normcore and minimalist aesthetics, and unisex elements inspired by 1990s grunge. Throughout the decade, retro revivals persisted, including 1980s-style neon streetwear and tailored or fit-and-flare mid-century silhouettes that reflected the growing interest in vintage fashion.

In the early years of the 2010s, youth-led trends, such as scene, swag, indie, and East Asian streetwear, gained momentum through social media platforms such as Tumblr, helping to popularize bright color schemes, layered accessories, and skinny jeans. By the mid-2010s, athleisure emerged internationally as a dominant force, emphasizing comfort and functionality. Social media influencers became increasingly prominent in shaping fashion trends, particularly in the global spread of fast fashion through apps like Pinterest and Instagram.

In the 2010s, fashion changed the most dramatically prior to any other decade and this is due to the idea of child influencers. Child influencers like North West and Blue Ivy inspired major brands such as Gucci, Polo Ralph Lauren, and Fendi to launch children's lines. All genders of children's fashion widely copied adult fashion and often times imitated them very closely. Ready-to-wear fashion was also becoming very popular due to fast fashion companies like Shein.

=== 2020s ===
The fashion of the 2020s represents a rejection of minimalistic 2010s fashion in favor of short-lived social-media trends and nostalgia for older aesthetics. It has been largely inspired by styles of the late 1970s to late 1980s, the late 1990s to mid-2000s, and elements of Modern Medieval fashion, boho-chic, Indie sleaze and mid-century fashions from the 1940s, 1950s and 1960s. The early and mid 2020s were driven by microtrends, social media influencers, and niche online communities that transformed internet aesthetics into the dominant tastemakers for fashion. Early in the decade, several publications noted the shortening trend cycles, niche revivals, and nostalgia cycles in 2020s fashion. The COVID-19 pandemic also had a major impact on the fashion industry and led to shifting retail and consumer trends.

In the 2020s, many companies, including fast fashion giants such as Shein and Temu, began using social media platforms such as TikTok and Instagram as a marketing tool. Marketing strategies involving third parties, particularly influencers and celebrities, have become prominent tactics. E-commerce platforms that promote small businesses, such as Depop and Etsy, grew by offering vintage, homemade, or resold clothing from individual sellers. Thrifting also exploded in popularity because of the potential to find valuable pieces of clothing at cheaper prices.

Though the decade of the 2020s is not over, children's fashion still closely resembles the fashion from the 2010s. However, what is known at this time is that the number of children influencers are increasing, spreading inspiration to children around the world. In addition, the textiles used for children's clothing tends to follow closely with either adult fashion or influencer fashion. It is seen that in teenager's fashion, trends appear to come and go in as little as months.

== See also ==
- Dress code
- Fashion
- Fashion design
- Fashion design copyright
- Haute couture
- Health Goth
- History of western fashion
- Deconstruction (fashion)
- 2000s in fashion
- 2010s in fashion
- James Laver
- List of fashion designers
- List of fashion topics
- List of individual dresses
- Sustainable fashion
