= Palmyre =

Palmyre may mean:

- Palmyra, an ancient city in Syria
- Palmire Dumont (1855–1915), known as Madame Palmyre, French manager of "Palmyr's Bar", a gay bar in Paris
- Madame Palmyre, a 19th-century French fashion designer
