= Catherine Donovan =

Irish-American dressmaker

- Born: c. 1826; Ireland
- Died: 16 April 1906 (aged 79); Lakewood Township, New Jersey, USA
- Occupation: Dressmaker
- Spouse: Charles Donovan

Catherine Donovan (c. 1826 – 16 April 1906), (also known as Mrs. C. Donovan or Mme Donovan) was an Irish-American dressmaker, best remembered for her dress shop/home on Madison Avenue in New York City in the early 20th century. Her designs have been preserved and exhibited in the collections of the Metropolitan Museum of Art and the Philadelphia Museum of Art.

== Biography ==
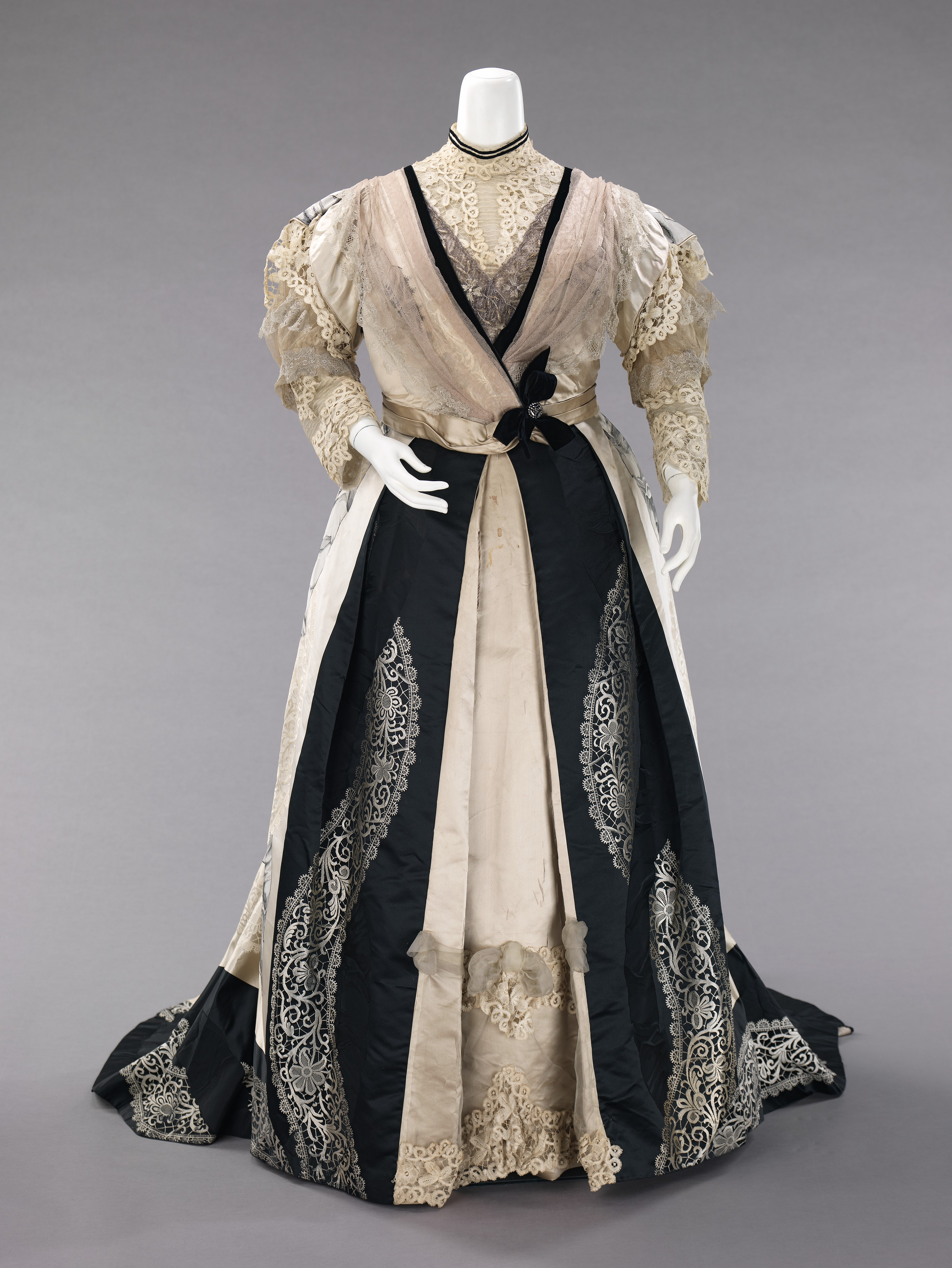
Evening dress designed by Catherine Donovan in the collection of the Metropolitan Museum of Art

Donovan was born in Ireland and emigrated to the United States when she was a child. She studied fashion design in Paris and established herself in New York, where she had her own store with showroom (after 1900 on Madison Avenue). She sold French designs by Charles Frederick Worth and Emile Pingat. Her own designs were heavily influenced by contemporary French designs, which can be seen, among other things, in the historical details she favored in her clothes. She was the fashion designer who in the second half of the 19th century was often hired by New York's upper-class shoppers.

The Philadelphia Museum of Art said of her:

After her death in 1906, Irish-born Catherine Donovan was described by the New York Times as "the pioneer dressmaker of the 400," for dressing New York's social elite known as the "400." She owned a building on Madison Avenue at 40th Street, where she sold imported gowns from leading Paris couturiers such as Charles Frederick Worth and Emile Pingat. At least once, her employees' baggage was seized at U.S. customs on suspicion of smuggling. It was common practice for seized goods to be auctioned publicly, and in 1893 over five hundred people attended an auction of Worth, Pingat, and other gowns seized from Donovan.

Her clientele included the wealthiest New Yorkers, according to her obituary:

Mrs. Donovan did not hang out a sign to attract trade; she didn't have to. She lived for many years in a handsome brownstone house of the southwest corner of Madison Avenue and Fortieth Street. She owned the property. ...The Goelets, Astors and Vanderbilts were patrons of Mrs. Donovan. The wedding gown worn by the Duchess of Marlborough was made under her supervision.

Many of her clothing creations are preserved and exhibited at the Metropolitan Museum of Art.

When she died in 1906 at almost 80 years of age at Lakewood Township, New Jersey, she had outlived her husband, Charles Donovan. They had no children.
