= Madame Vignon =

French fashion designer

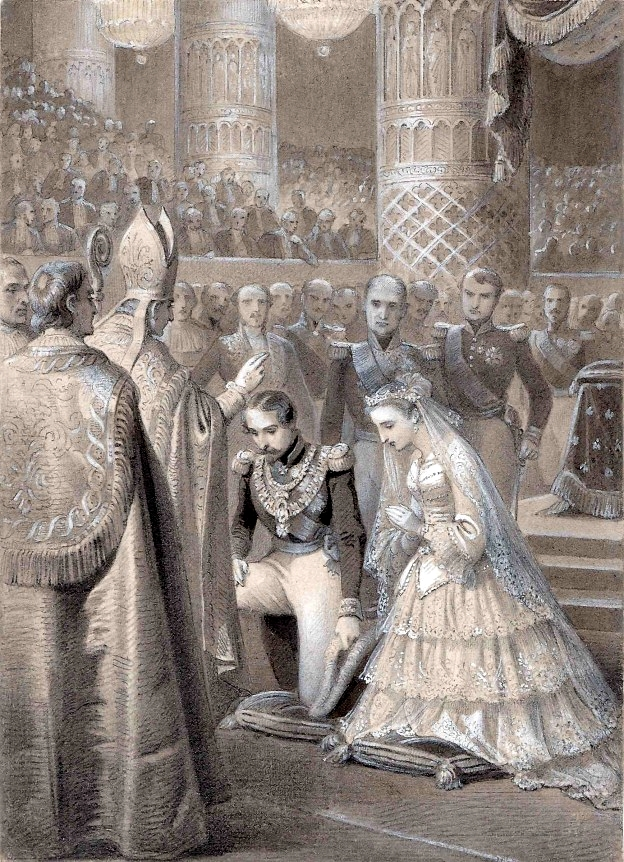
Philippoteaux mariage de Napoléon III. Madame Vignon designed the wedding dress of the empress.

Madame Vignon, also known as Madame Vignon-Chauvin (19th century), was a French fashion designer Couturier.

Madame Vignon was an established fashion designer during the July Monarchy. She enjoyed a successful career, and came to have an influential position within the French fashion industry and mentioned as a member of the elite fashion designers in mid-19th-century Paris in the era of the Second Republic and Second Empire, alongside other top designers such as Madame Camille, Madame Palmyre and Madame Victorine.

As one of the top seamstresses in Paris, she and her main rival Madame Palmyre was engaged to deliver the 54 dresses trousseau of the new empress of France, Eugénie de Montijo, upon the wedding of Emperor Napoleon III in 1853; it was also Vignon who was given the assignment to design Eugenie´s wedding dress, which became internationally famous. She did the day dresses of the empress, while Palmyre did the evening dresses.

The fashion house founded by Madame Vignon, Maison Vignon, traded at 182 Rue de Rivoli, Paris.. In 1896, the owners of Maison Vignon - sibling Charles and Fanny Coullon - sold the business to the Haguès de La Bigne sisters, nieces of the famous courtesan Valtesse de La Bigne. One of them, Jeanne Riondet (wihe of an officer in the Republican Guard), kept the business to 12 Rue de La Boétie, in the 8th arrondissement. Among the establishment’s clients during the Belle Époque were Princess Bibesco, Tsarina Alexandra, and Countess Avrinsky. Jeanne Riondet would travel by train to the court in Saint Petersburg to take the princesses' measurements, returning to Paris with dress forms tailored to those specific dimensions.However, poor management, the loss of a princely clientele - particulary the Russians - during the war, and competition from new, less traditional fashion houses led to downfall of this aristocratic institution. In 1919, Jeanne Riondet opened "Maison Andrée" at 7 Avenue Montaigne, in the 8th arrondissement, but by the following year the business had moved to 7 Rue Boissonade, un the 14th arrondissement - a change of address that signaled a decline in the establishment's prestige. Jeanne Riondet retired shortly thereafter. Fashion historian Jean-Noël Vigoureux-Loridon, who is a related to her, has traced the history of the Maison Vignon.

Gallery

Dresses by Maison Vignon

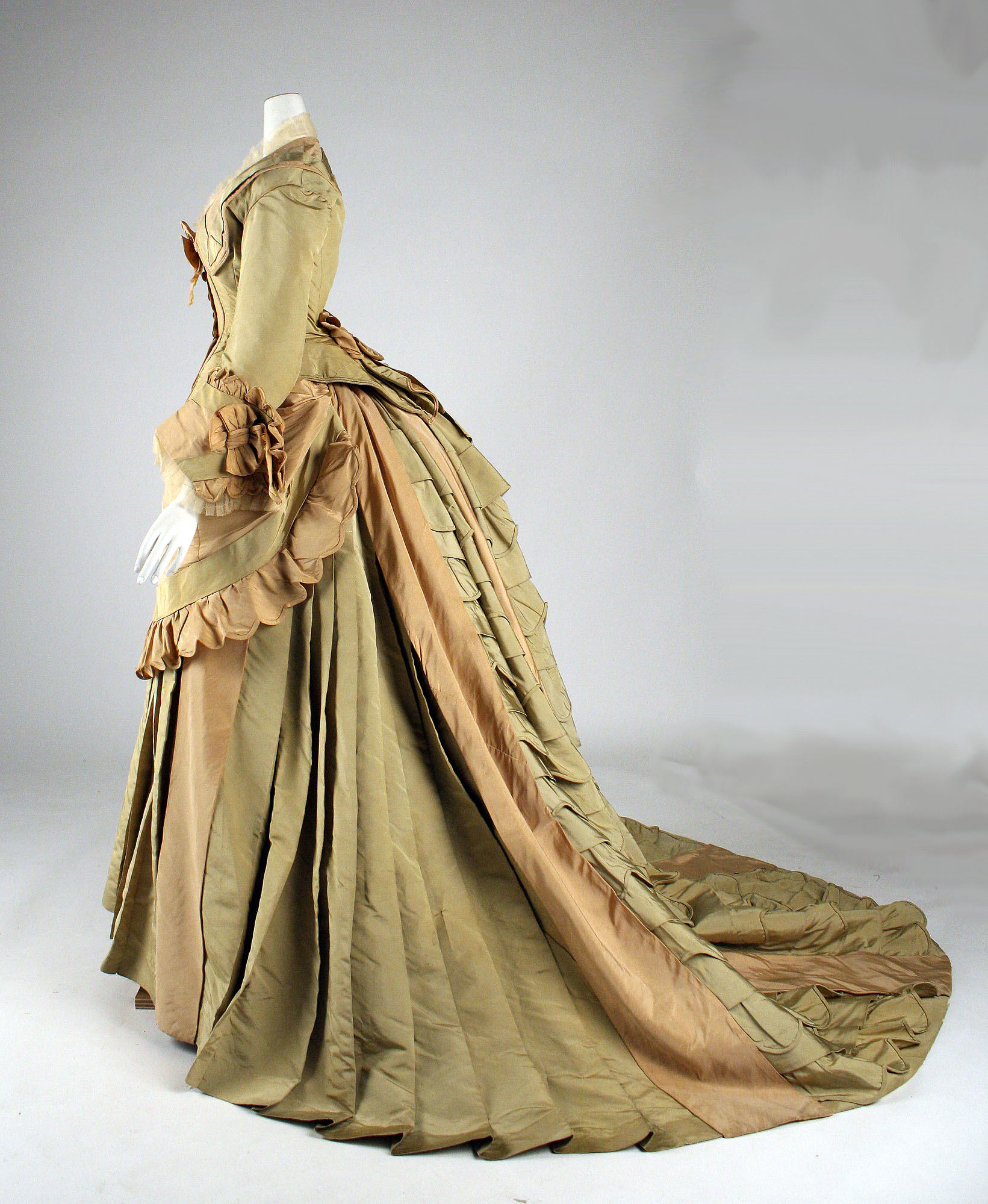
Dress, c. 1872, Metropolitan Museum of Art

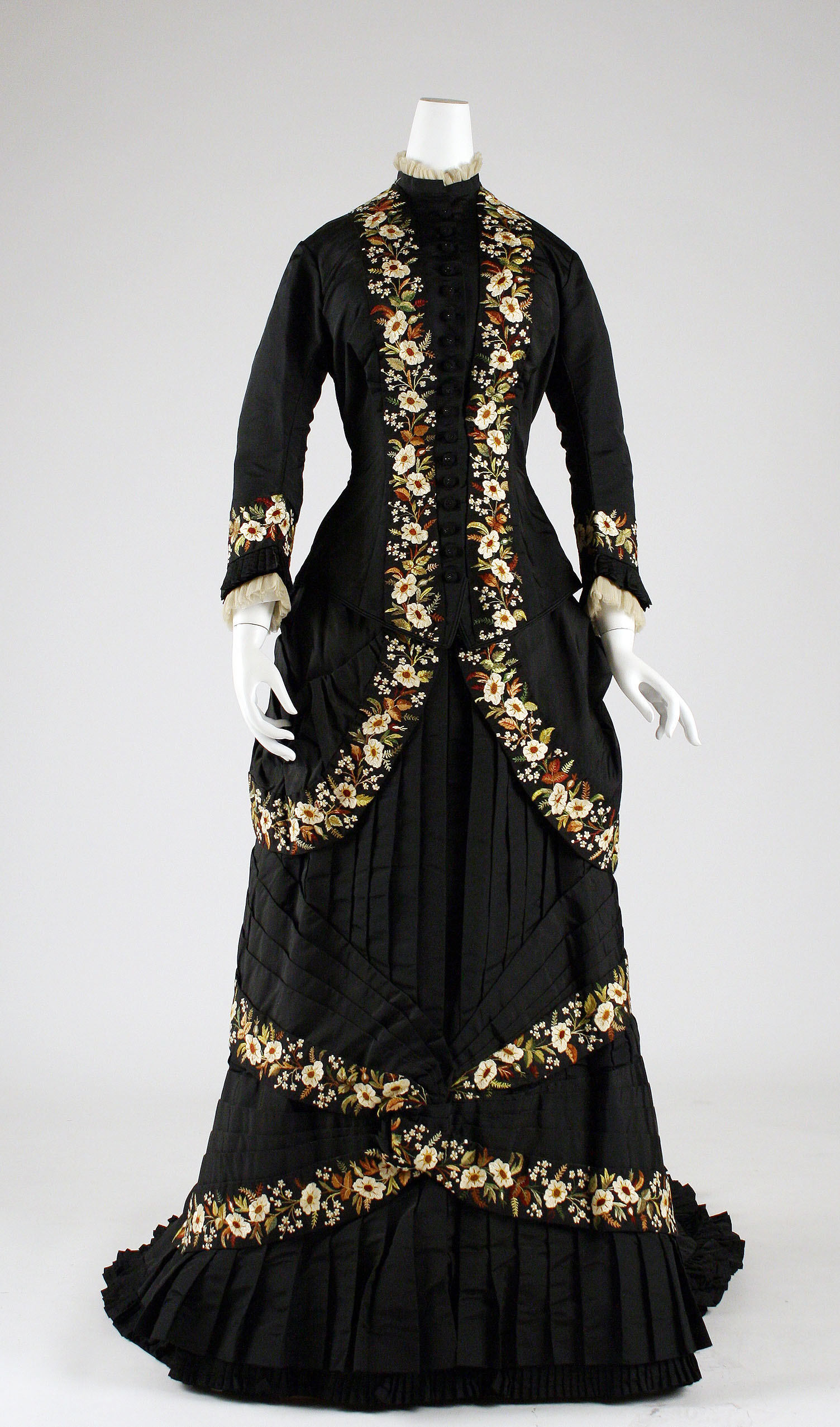
Dinner dress, 1878-79, Metropolitan Museum of Art

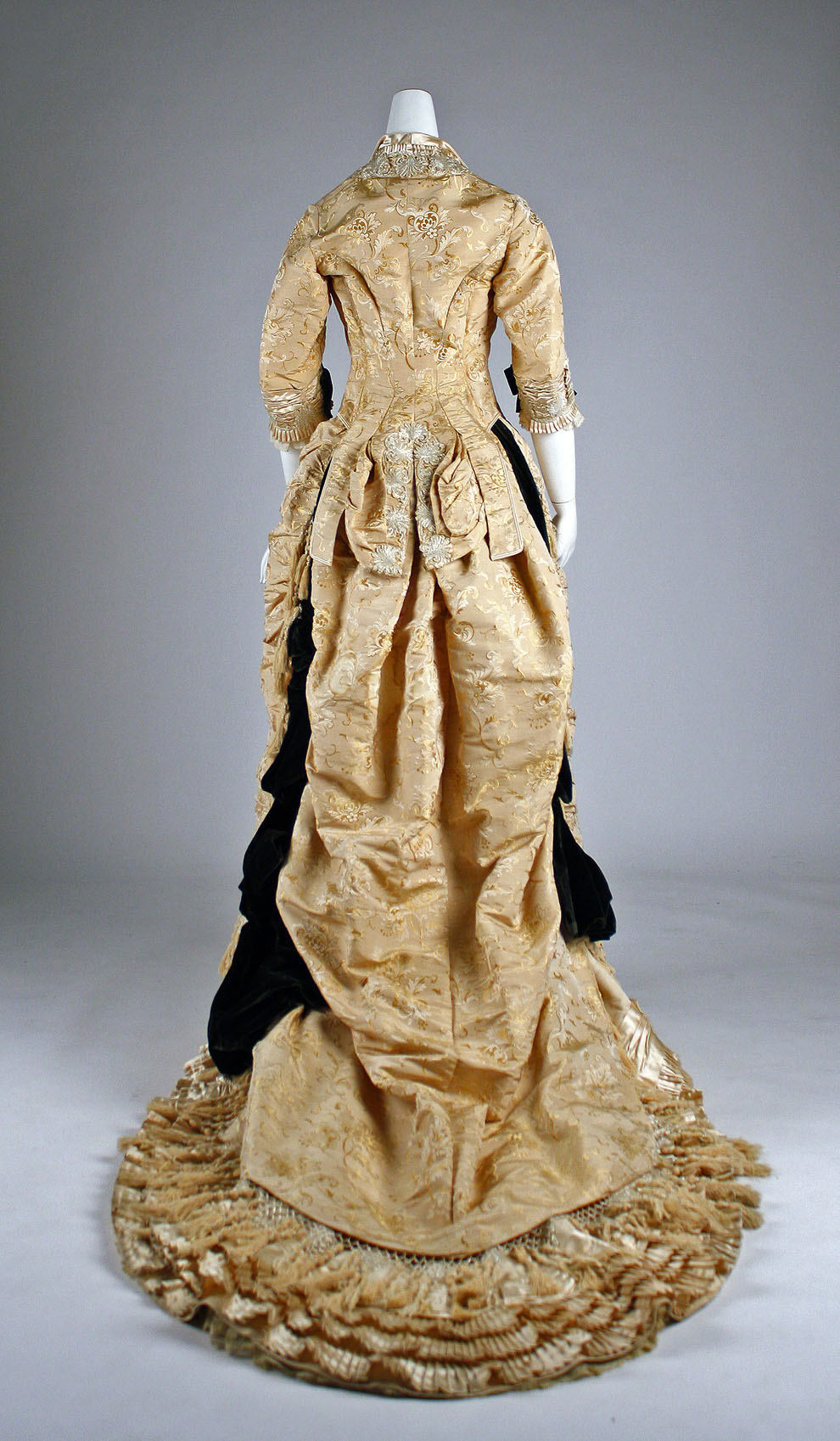
Dinner dress, 1875-79, Metropolitan Museum of Art

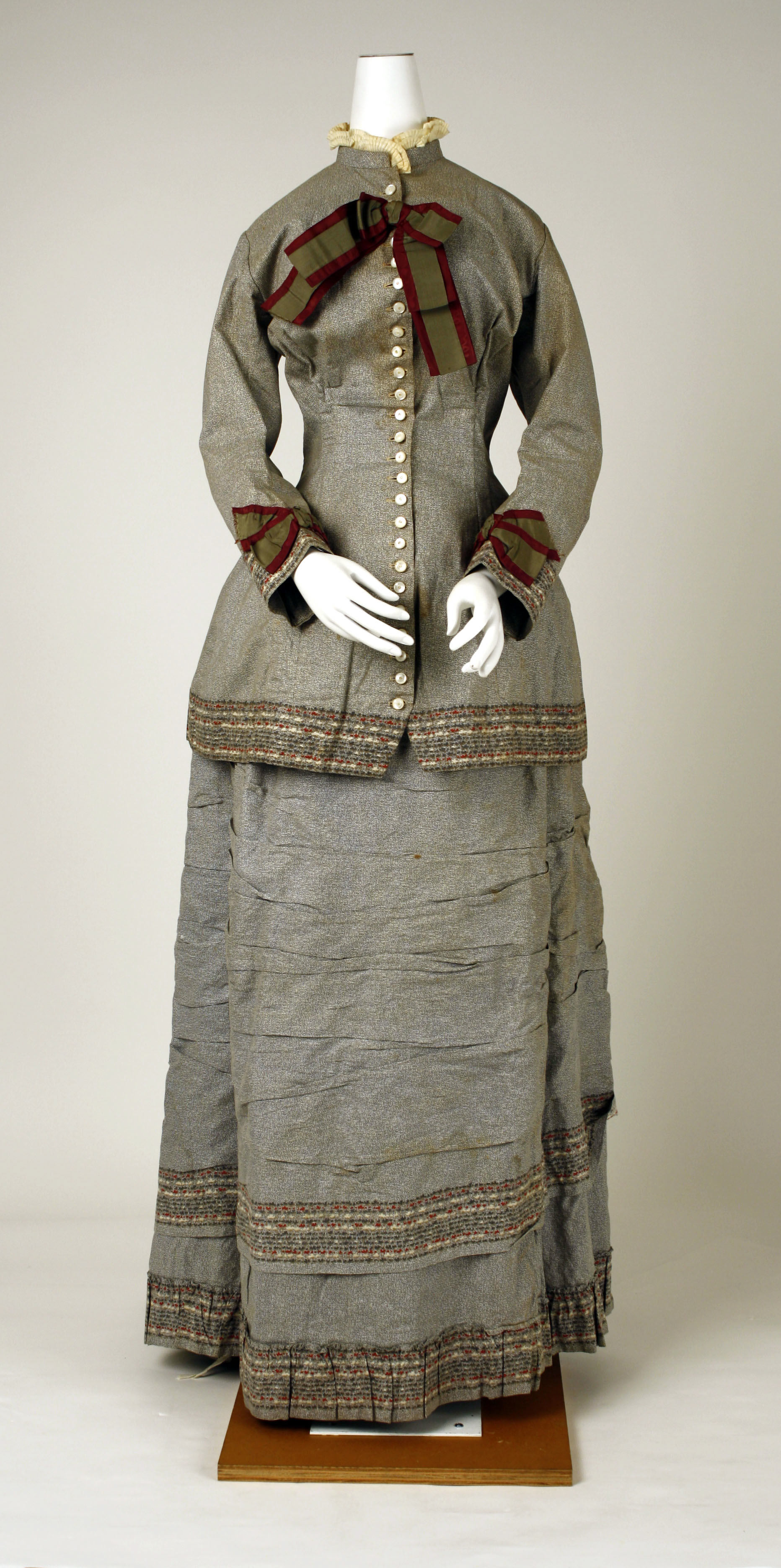
Dress, c. 1880, Metropolitan Museum of Art

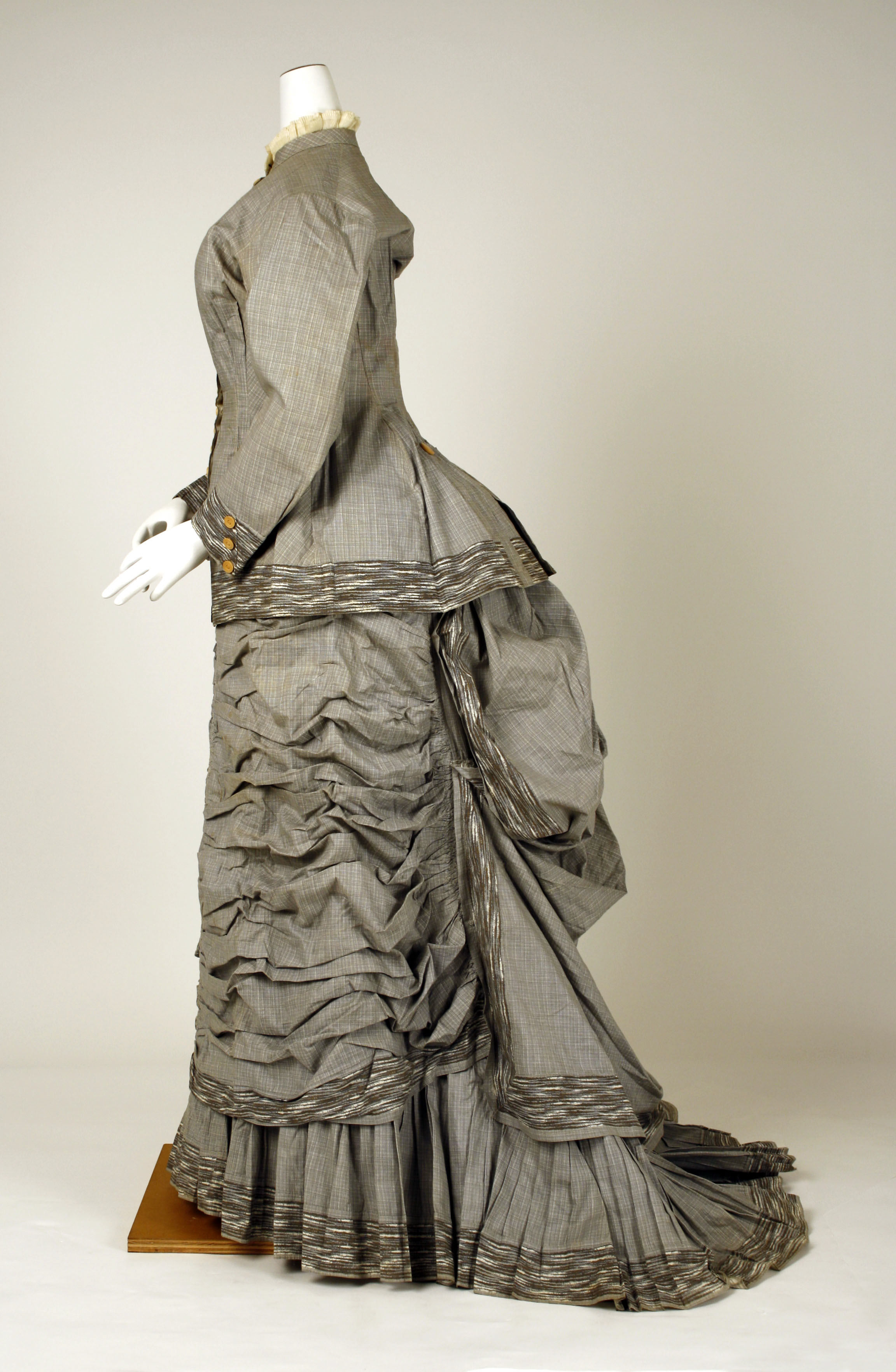
Dress, c. 1880, Metropolitan Museum of Art
