= Marie Vernet =

French model (1825–1898)

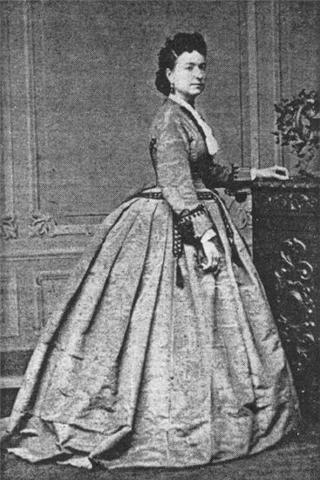
Marie Vernet Worth

Marie Augustine Worth née Vernet, known as Marie Vernet (1825–1898) was a French fashion model and businesswoman.

She was a former fashon house sales girl and from 1851 married to the famous fashion designer Charles Frederick Worth. When the fashion House of Worth was founded in 1858, her husband suggested to her that she modelled his clothes for his clients, which made her to the first living model to show clothing, a task previously filled by dolls. After the death of her husband in 1895, she took over and managed the Worth fashion house until her death in companionship with her sons.
