= Capucci =

Capucci is a surname. Notable people with the surname include:

- Fabrizio Capucci (1939–2024), Italian actor and producer
- Hilarion Capucci (1922–2017), titular archbishop of Caesarea in Palaestina
- Roberto Capucci (born 1930), Italian fashion designer
