= Medieval fashion =

Medieval fashion may refer to:

- English medieval clothing
- Early medieval European dress
- High and late medieval European dress:
  - 1100–1200 in European fashion
  - 1200–1300 in European fashion
  - 1300–1400 in European fashion
  - 1400–1500 in European fashion

== See also ==
- Anglo-Saxon dress
- Byzantine dress
- History of Western fashion
