= Madame Victorine =

French fashion designer

Victorine Pierrard, known as Madame Victorine, was a French fashion designer couturier. She was noted as one of the leading elite fashion designers of Parisian fashion in the 1830s, and was favored by Queen Victoria.

== Life and career ==
Victorine Pierrard was the niece to Louis-Hippolyte Leroy. Madame Victorine was initially a student of her uncle. She was also a student and a business partner of Madame Guérin, an elite milliner of the Bourbon Restoration.

Madame Victorine designed hats as well as clothing. She was an established fashion designer during the Bourbon Restoration and the July Monarchy. She enjoyed a successful career, came to have an influential position within the French fashion industry, and was amongst the elite fashion designers in Paris. In the 1830s, she was noted among the leading fashion designers in Paris, alongside Madame Palmyre, Madame Oudot-Manoury and Mme. Beaudrant. It was said that Madame Victorine enjoyed such success that she was able to name any price for her designs. In the contemporary fashion magazine La Mode, she and her uncle Louis-Hippolyte Leroy are described as artists and geniuses, and the scissor of Madame Victorine was compared to the paint brush of the painter François Gérard.

Madame Victorine was a favorite milliner of Queen Victoria. Among her most known students were the highly successful Madame Palmyre.

Madame Victorine is referenced several times as the top Paris seamstress in the fiction of Balzac.
