= Madame Palmyre =

French fashion designer

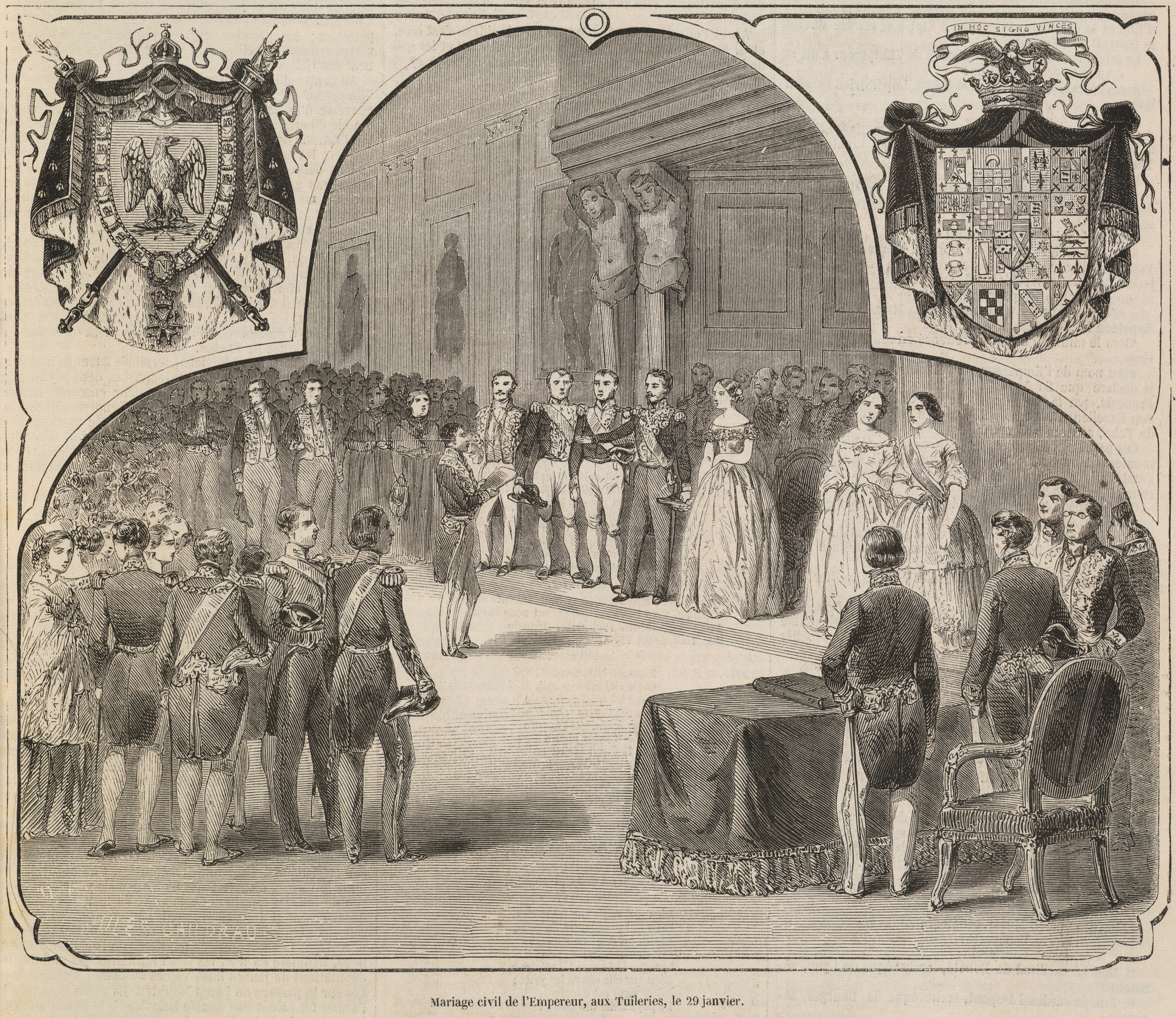
The wedding of the Emperor Napoleon III

Anne-Palmire Chartier, known as Madame Palmyre and Mademoiselle Palmyre, was a French fashion designer couturier. She was the co-owner of the fashion house Palmire, Chartier et Legrand.

== Life and career ==
Madame Palmyre was an established fashion designer during the July Monarchy. She enjoyed a successful career, and came to have an influential position within the French fashion industry and mentioned as a member of the elite fashion designers in mid-19th-century Paris in the era of the Second French Republic and Second Empire, alongside other top designers such as Madame Camille, Madame Vignon-Chauvin and Madame Victorine. She was particularly noted for her ball gowns, which was commented upon once by Alfred de Musset.

Among her famous clients were Louise of Orléans, María Francisca de Sales Portocarrero, 16th Duchess of Peñaranda and Isabella II of Spain. As one of the top seamstresses in Paris, she and Madame Vignon were engaged to deliver the 54 dresses trousseau of the new empress upon the wedding of Emperor Napoleon III in 1853. Vignon did the empress' 32 day dresses, and Palmyre the 20 evening dresses. During the 1850s, she was the favorite designer and dressmaker of the empress of France, Eugénie de Montijo, before she was replaced by Charles Frederick Worth.
