= Hajnal =

Hajnal may refer to:

- Hajnal (name)
- Hajnal line, a division of Europe into areas characterized by a different levels of nuptiality
- "Hajnal", a song by Venetian Snares from Rossz Csillag Alatt Született
