= Women in the Middle Ages =

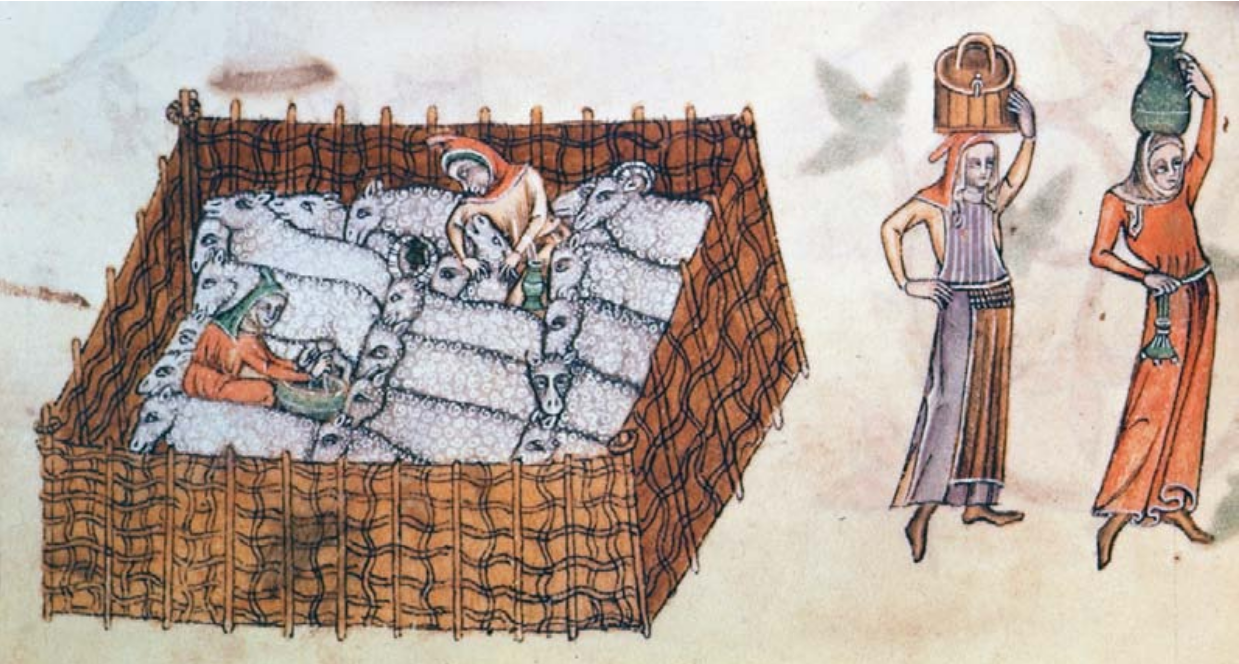
An agricultural scene from the 14th-century English Luttrell Psalter, with a woman milking sheep and two women carrying vessels on their heads

Women in the Middle Ages in Europe occupied a number of different social roles, such as saints, nobles, peasants, wives, mothers, warriors, artisans, and nuns, as well as some important leadership roles, such as abbesses or queen regnants. The very concept of women changed in a number of ways during the Middle Ages, and several forces influenced women's roles during this period, while also expanding upon their traditional roles in society and the economy.

== Early Middle Ages (476–1000) ==
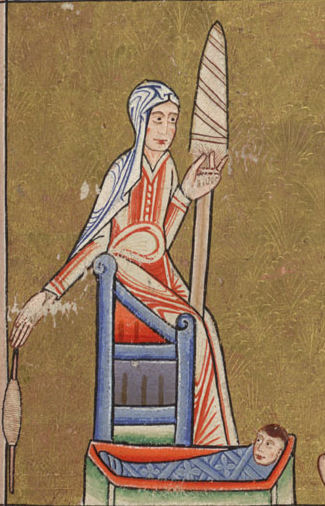
Spinning by hand was a traditional form of women's work (illustration c. 1170).

In the early Middle Ages, women's lives varied greatly depending on their location and status. Ecclesiastical sources offer particularly rich information about women living under Christian rule; some leftovers from the Roman era that offer clues about women elsewhere. For example, following Roman and German Law, women had some limited control over her own marriage, dowry, and property.

As Christianity began to spread in Europe, women's roles were largely defined in relation to the Christian Church. For some women, Christianity was attractive due to the independence and autonomy the religion could offer; Christian monasticism allowed women to reject the identity of wife and mother, as well as childbirth, which could be life-threatening. Additionally, Christian women could have active religious roles. For example, abbesses could become important figures, occasionally ruling over monasteries of both men and women, and holding significant lands and power. Figures such as Hilda of Whitby (c. 614–680) became influential on a national and even international scale.

For secular Christian women, authority was largely attached to class status. Women such as Radegund were able to contribute to the spread of Christianity through her role as wife and Queen. Wealthy women such as Dhuoda illustrate that female autonomy in the Carolingian era was possible, but women's relationships were largely still shaped around familial and communal connections. In fact, evidence of matronymic names indicate that a matriarchal lineage could be useful when distinguishing a lineage, or when relying on a woman's prominent position within society.

Non-elite women shared labour with their male counterparts, but this work was still largely divided by gender. Women oversaw household activities such as cooking, brewing, spinning, and weaving, as well as care of livestock. Following Burgundian law and Visigothic law, women might also act as land owners and managers, particularly when they were unmarried, widowed, or when their husbands were away from home.

== High Middle Ages (1000–1300) ==
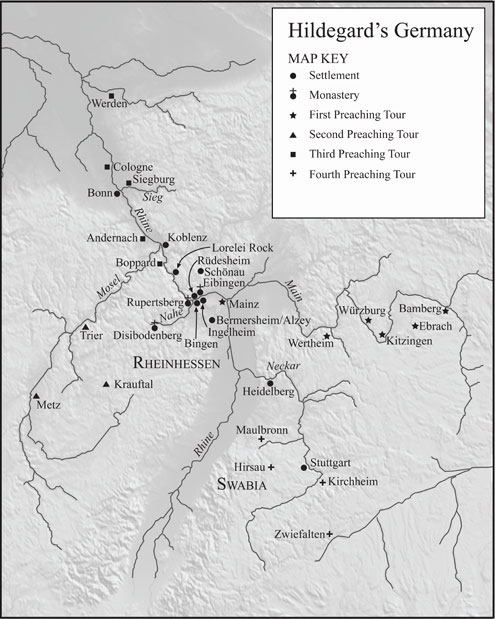
Hildegard of Bingen conducted a number of preaching tours throughout Germany.

By the end of the tenth century, Christianity had reached most corners of the European world. Al-Andalus, the region which became modern-day Spain and Portugal, was still largely Islamic, and the Norse countries, while in contact with Christianity, were still undergoing conversion. There is more evidence of Jewish communities being established in towns and cities throughout central Europe. Historians also have more evidence of women (and in general) and how they interacted with the world around them beginning in the High Middle Ages.

Developments within the Christian Church during the eleventh and twelfth centuries impacted women in Western Europe, both religious and secular. The Gregorian Reforms heavily restricted clerical marriage, which in turn affected a number of women who had previously held positions as priest's wives. The Reforms entailed a restructuring of the monastic system which largely excluded women, creating zones that were male only. Moreover, the Reforms triggered a type of repression in which celibacy was a marker of ritual purity distinguishing clerics from laypeople. Women's bodies in turn were viewed as inherently polluting.

At the same time, however, there were aspects of Christianity that enabled female spiritual growth. For a brief time, double monasteries again became popular, through which abbesses held spiritual and political power (for ex: Fontevraud Abbey). Herrad of Landsberg, Hildegard of Bingen, and Héloïse d'Argenteuil were influential abbesses and authors during this period. Hadewijch of Antwerp was a poet and mystic.

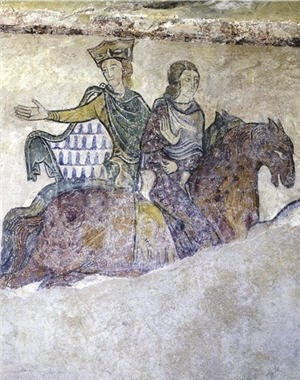
Eleanor of Aquitaine was a wealthy and powerful woman.

Moreover, the growing cult of Mary Magdalene allowed destitute women, such as the poor, widowed, prostitutes, and former priest's wives to seek refuge at Magdalene houses. The parallel cult of the Virgin Mary reframed contemplation of Christ through Mary's suffering. Regarding the role of women in the Church, Pope Innocent III wrote in 1210: "No matter whether the most blessed Virgin Mary stands higher, and is also more illustrious, than all the apostles together, it was still not to her, but to them, that the Lord entrusted the keys to the Kingdom of Heaven". Both cults allowed secular women to engage with female sanctity where they had been previously excluded due to their non-celibate status.

Secularly, female rulers became prominent in the twelfth and thirteenth centuries. The Empress Matilda fought for the right to rule her father's kingdom, successfully guaranteeing an extension of her lineage and the rule of the Plantagenets. Her son married Eleanor of Aquitaine (1122–1204), who was one of the wealthiest and most powerful women in Western Europe during the High Middle Ages. She was the patroness of such literary figures as Wace, Benoît de Sainte-Maure, and Chrétien de Troyes. Eleanor succeeded her father as suo jure Duchess of Aquitaine and Countess of Poitiers at the age of 15. Constance, Queen of Sicily, Urraca of León and Castile, Joan I of Navarre, Melisende, Queen of Jerusalem, and other queens regnant exercised political power.

The development of canon law also impacted Christian women's status. The Fourth Lateran Council solidified the need for consent within marriage, assuring women of some autonomy. However, men such as Thomas Aquinas dictated that women owed their husbands a conjugal debt.

== Late Middle Ages (1300–1500) ==
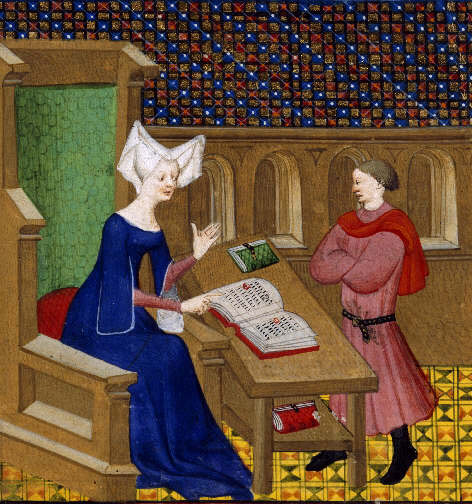
Christine de Pizan became a professional writer after the death of her husband in 1390.

In the Late Middle Ages, women such as Saint Catherine of Siena, who helped stimulate interest in a crusade with Pope Gregory XI to reform Catholic Church, and Saint Teresa of Ávila, who emphasized impact of the love of God on the heart, played significant roles in the development of theological ideas and discussion within the church, and were later declared Doctors of the Roman Catholic Church. The mystic Julian of Norwich was also significant in England for being considered the first woman to write a book that survived and was also written in English.

Isabella I of Castile ruled a combined kingdom with her husband Ferdinand II of Aragon. Joan of Arc successfully led the French army on several occasions during the Hundred Years' War.

Christine de Pizan was a noted late medieval writer on women's issues. Her Book of the City of Ladies criticized misogyny, while her The Treasure of the City of Ladies articulated an ideal of feminine virtue for women from talks of life ranging from princess to peasant's wife. Her advice to the princess includes a recommendation to use diplomatic skills to prevent war:

If any neighbouring or foreign prince wishes for any reason to make war against her husband, or if her husband wishes to make war on someone else, the good lady will consider this thing carefully, bearing in mind the great evils and infinite cruelties, destruction, massacres and detriment to the country that result from war; the outcome is often terrible. She will ponder long and hard whether she can do something (always preserving the honour of her husband) to prevent this war.

From the last century of the Middle Ages onwards, restrictions began to be placed on women's work, and guilds became increasingly male-only; some of the reasons may have been the rising status and political role of guilds and the increasing competition from cottage industries, which prompted the guilds to tighten their entrance requirements. Women's property rights also began to be curtailed during this period.

== Marriage ==
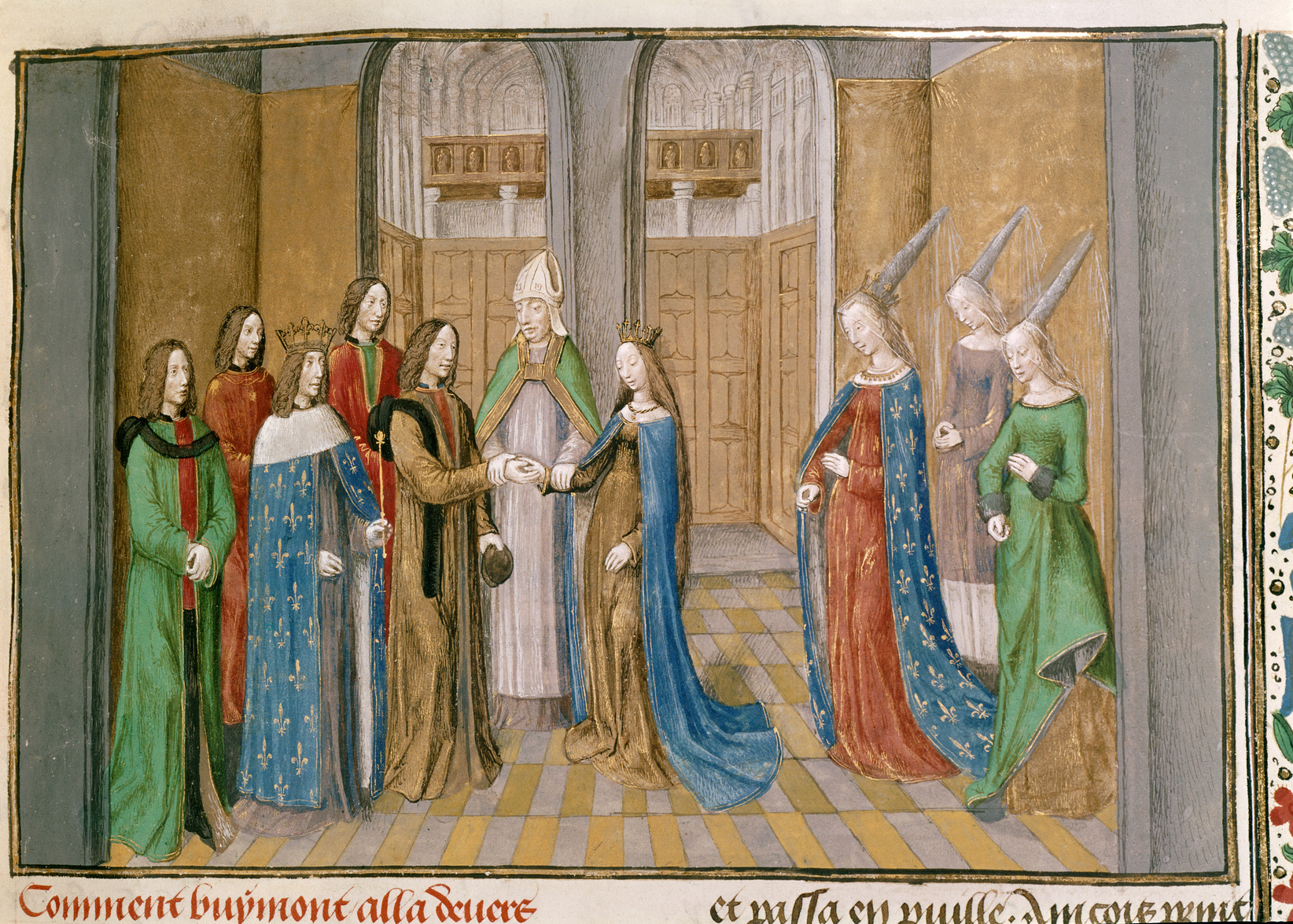
A royal marriage, painted c. 1475

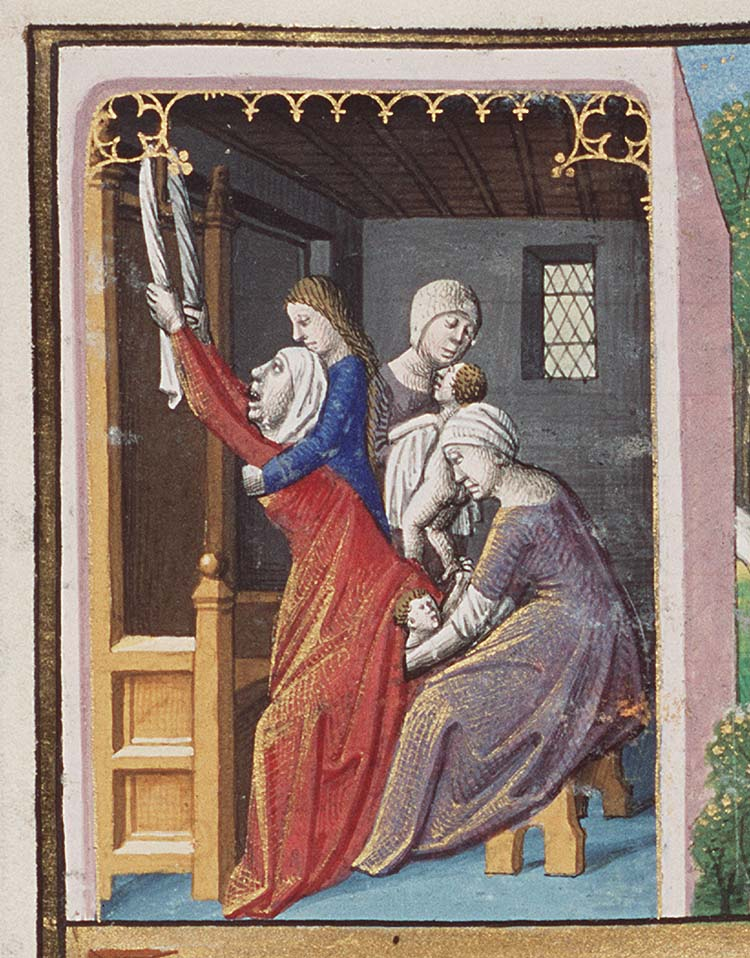
Biblical scene of childbirth of twins

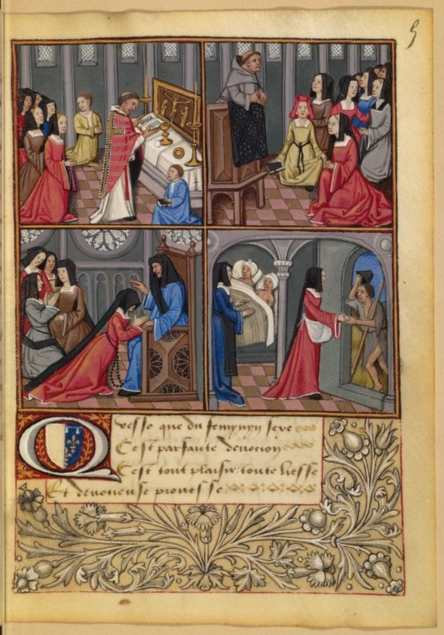
Scenes of female piety, France, c. 1500

Medieval marriage was both a private and social matter. According to canon law, the law of the Catholic Church, marriage was a concrete exclusive bond between husband and wife; giving the husband all power and control in the relationship. Husband and wife were partners and were supposed to reflect Adam and Eve. Even though wives had to submit to their husbands' authority, wives still had rights in their marriages. Historian Sara McDougall concurs with Charles Reid's argument that both men and women shared rights in regards to sex and marriage; which includes: "the right to consent to marriage, the right to ask for marital debt or conjugal (sexual) duty, the right to leave a marriage when they either suspected it was invalid or had grounds to sue for separation, and finally the right to choose one's own place of burial, death being the point at which a spouse's ownership of the other spouse's body ceased".

Regionally and across the time span of the Middle Ages, marriage could be formed differently. Marriage could be proclaimed in secret by the mutually consenting couple, or arranged between families as long as the man and woman were not forced and consented freely; but by the 12th century in western canon law, consent (whether in mutual secrecy or in a public sphere) between the couple was imperative. Marriages confirmed in secrecy were seen as problematic in the legal sphere due to spouses redacting and denying that the marriage was solidified and consummated.

Peasants, slaves, maidservants, and generally lower-class women required the permission and consent of their master in order to marry, and if they did not have it, they were punished (see below in Law).

Marriage also allowed for the couples' social networks to expand. This was according to Bennett (1984) who investigated the marriage of Henry Kroyl Jr. and Agnes Penifader, and how their social spheres changed after their marriage. Due to the couples' fathers, Henry Kroyl Sr. and Robert Penifader being prominent villagers in Brigstock, Northamptonshire, approximately 2,000 references to the activities of the couple and their immediate families were being recorded. Bennett details how Kroyl Jr.'s social network expanded greatly as he gained connections through his occupational endeavors.

Agnes' connections expanded also based on Kroyl Jr.'s new connections. However, Bennett also signifies that a familial alliance between the couples' families of origin did not form. Kroyl Jr. had limited contact with his father after his marriage, and his social network expanded from the business he conducted with his brothers and other villagers. Agnes, who still maintained some contact with her family, also expanded her social network to include her husband's family of origin and his new connections.

=== Widowhood and remarriage ===
Upon the death of a spouse, widows could gain power in inheriting their husbands' property as opposed to adult sons. Male-preference primogeniture stipulated that the male heir was to inherit their deceased father's land; and in cases of no sons, the eldest daughter would inherit property. However, widows could inherit property when they had minor sons, or if provisions were made for them to inherit. Peter Franklin (1986) investigated the women tenants of Thornbury during the Black Death due to the higher than average proportion of women tenants. Through court rolls, he found that many widows in this area independently held land successfully. He argued that some widows may have remarried due to keeping up with their tenure and financial difficulties of holding their inherited land, or community pressures for the said widow to remarry if she had a male servant living in her home. Remarriage would put the widow under the control of her new husband. However, some widows never remarried and held the land until their deaths, thereby ensuring their independence. Even young widows, who would have had an easier time remarrying, remained independent and unmarried. Franklin considers the lives of widows to have been "liberating" because women had more autonomous control over their lives and property; they were able to "argue their own cases in court, hire labour, and cultivate and manage holdings successfully".

Franklin also discusses that some Thornbury widows had second and even third marriages. Remarriage would have affected inheritance of property, especially if the widow had children with her second husband; however there are several cases where sons from the widow's first marriage were able to inherit before the second husband.

McDougall also notes that, like the varying forms of marriage, the canon law regarding remarriage varied across regions. Both men and women could have been permitted to freely remarry or may have been restricted and/or deemed to serve penance before remarrying.

== Medieval elite women ==
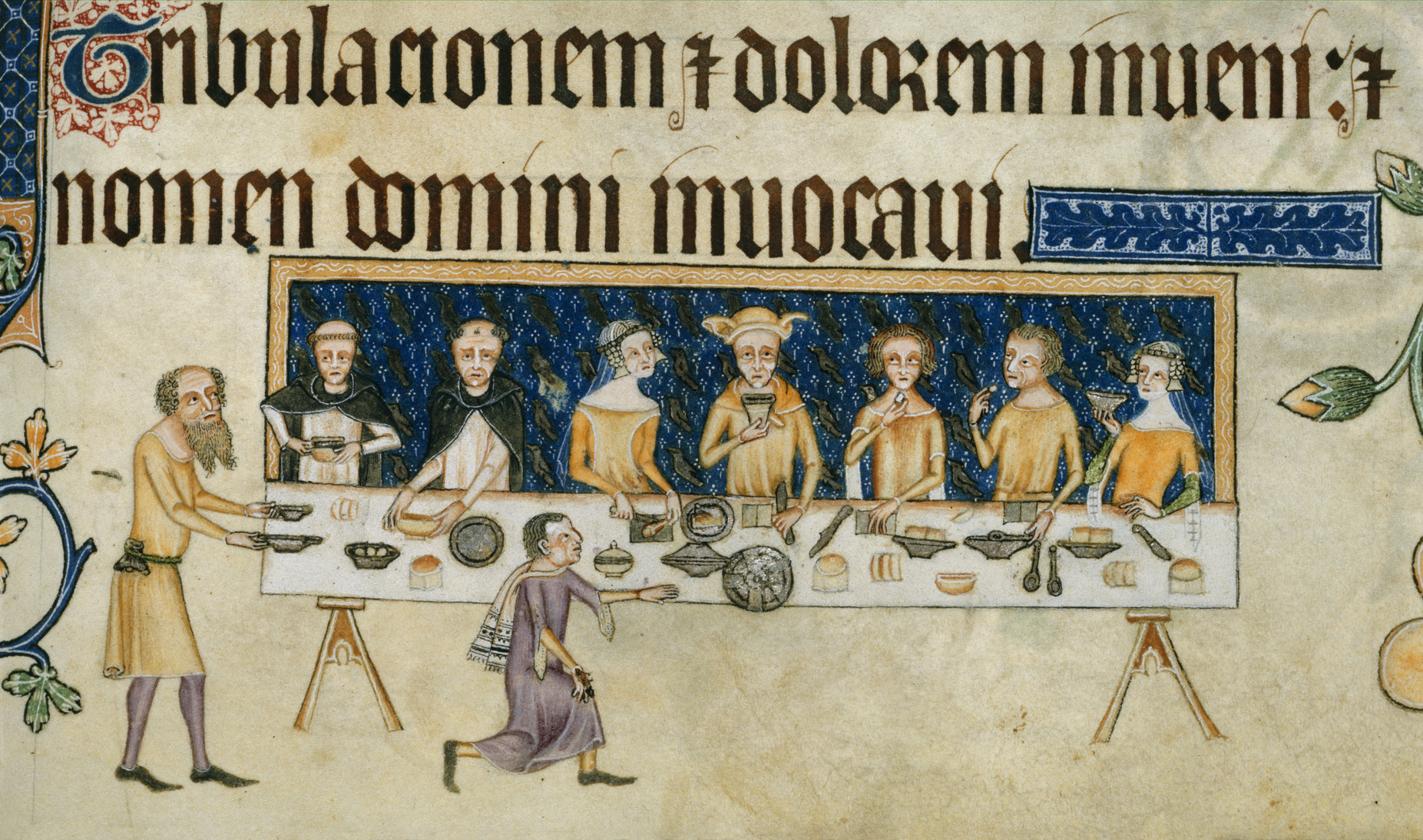
Sir Geoffrey Luttrell at table - Luttrell Psalter (c.1325–1335)

In the Middle Ages the upper socioeconomic groups generally included royalty and nobility. Conduct books from the period present an image of the role of elite women being to obey their spouse, guard their virtue, produce offspring, and to oversee the operation of the household. For those women who did adhere to these traditional roles, the responsibilities could be considerable, with households sometimes including dozens of people. Further, when their husbands were away the role of women could increase substantially. By the High and Late Middle Ages there were numerous royal and noble women who assumed control of their husbands' domains in their absence, including defense and even bearing arms.

Noble women were natural parts of the cultural and political environments of their time due to their positions and kinship. Particularly when acting as regents, elite women would assume the full feudal, economic, political and judicial powers of their husbands or young heirs. These women were not prohibited from receiving fiefdoms or owning real property during their husbands' lives. Noble women were often patrons of literature, art, monasteries and convents, and religious men. It was not uncommon for them to be knowledgeable in Latin literature.

== Women practicing medicine ==
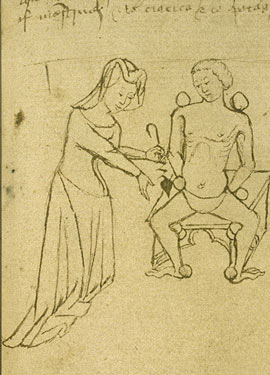
A woman who is a physician caring for a patient is dressed in the height of contemporary fashion

The most common way for women to enter the medical field was through becoming a nun, as hospitals were often branches of monasteries and nunneries. Many others found their way into the field by joining medical guilds or being the wives and daughters of medical practitioners. While many medical fields were male dominated, the one exception was midwifery, where women would assist not only with childbirth but provide advice for everything from gynecological concerns to colds and fevers.

In 12th-century Salerno, Italy, Trota wrote one of the Trotula texts on diseases of women. This book is a compilation of three original texts, Book on the Conditions of Women, On Treatments of Women, and On Women's Cosmetics. Based on medical information developed in the Ancient Greek and Roman eras, these texts discussed ailments, disease, and possible treatments for women's health issues. This included treatments for woman centered illnesses, like miscarriages, pain post-birth, and signs of pregnancy, as well as less gender specific illnesses, such as sunburns. These quickly became the basis for the medical treatment of women in the Middle Ages.

The Abbess Hildegard of Bingen, classed among medieval single women, wrote, in her 12th-century treatise Physica and Causae et Curae, about many issues concerning health. Hildegard was one of the most well known of medieval medical authors. In particular, Hildegard contributed much valuable knowledge in the use of herbs as well as observations regarding women's physiology and spirituality. In nine sections, Hildegard's volume reviews the medical uses for plants, the earth's elements (earth, water, and air), and animals. Also included are investigations of metals and jewels. Hildegard also explored such issues as laughter, tears, and sneezing, on the one hand, and poisons and aphrodisiacs, on the other. Her work was compiled in a religious environment but also relied on past wisdom and new findings about women's health and the nature of women's bodies. Hildegard's work not only addresses illness and cures but also explores the theory of medicine.

== Medieval peasant women ==
In terms of labour, women of the peasantry had more gender equality than in the nobility. However, most scholars agree that impoverished women had fundamentally the same subordinate status as women elsewhere in medieval society.

Women likely only attended village meetings if they were unmarried or widowed. Due to poor nutrition and the dangers of childbirth, women's life expectancy at birth was less than that of male peasants: perhaps 25 years. As a result, in some places, there were four men for every three women.

Chris Middleton made these general observations about English peasant women: "A peasant woman's life was, in fact, hemmed in by prohibition and restraint." If single, women had to submit to the male head of her household; if married, to her husband, under whose identity she was subsumed. English peasant women generally could not hold lands for long, rarely learned any craft occupation and rarely advanced past the position of assistants, and could not become officials.

Peasant women had numerous restrictions placed on their behaviour by their lords. If a woman was pregnant, and not married, or had sex outside of marriage, the lord was entitled to compensation. The control of peasant women was a function of financial benefits to the lords. They were not motivated by women's moral state. Also during this period, sexual activity was not regulated, with couples simply living together outside a formal ceremony, provided they had permission by their lord. Even without a feudal lord involved with her life, a woman still had supervision by their father, brothers or other male members of the family. Women had little control over their own lives.

Middleton provided some exceptions: English peasant women, on their own behalf, could plead in manorial courts; some female freeholders enjoyed immunities from male peers and landlords; and some trades (such as ale-brewing), provided female workers with independence. Still, Middleton viewed these as exceptions which required historians only to modify, rather than revise, "the essential model of female subservience."

=== Overview of the medieval European economy ===
In medieval Western Europe, society and economy were largely rural and agricultural. Ninety percent of the European population lived in the countryside or in small towns. Due to the lack of mechanical devices, activities were performed mostly by human labour. Both men and women participated in the medieval workforce and most workers were not paid by wages for their labour, but instead independently worked on their land and produced their own goods for consumption. Whittle cautioned against the "modern assumption that active economic involvement and hard work translate into status and wealth" because during Middle Ages, hard work only ensured survival against starvation. Peasant women suffered many disadvantages such as fewer landholdings, occupational exclusions, and lower wages.

=== Labour ===
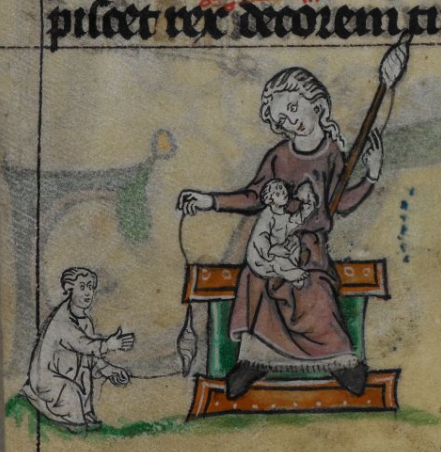
Spinning, with two children

Generally, research has determined that there was limited gender division of labour among peasant men and women. Agricultural historian Jane Whittle wrote: "Labour was divided according to the workers' gender. Some activities were restricted to either men or women; other activities were preferred to be performed by one gender over the other:" For example. men ploughed, mowed, and threshed, and women gleaned, cleared weeds, bound sheaves, made hay, and collected wood. Other tasks such as harvesting, were performed by both men and women.

Both peasant men and women worked in the home and out in the fields. In looking at coroner records for 14th-century rural England detailing the accidental deaths of 1,000 people, which represent the lives of peasants more clearly, Barbara Hanawalt found that 30% of women died in their homes compared to 12% of men; 9% of women died on a private property (i.e. a neighbour's house, a garden area, manor house, etc.) compared to 6% of men; 22% of women died in public areas within their village (i.e. greens, streets, churches, markets, highways, etc.) compared to 18% of men. Men dominated accidental deaths within fields at 38% compared to 18% of women, and men had 4% more accidental deaths in water than women did. Accidental deaths of women (61%) occurred within their homes and villages; while men had only 36%. This information correlated with the activities and labours regarding the maintenance and responsibilities of working in a household. These include: food preparation, laundry, sewing, brewing, getting water, starting fires, tending to children, collecting produce, and working with domestic animals. Outside of the household and village, 4% of women died in agricultural accidents compared to 19% of men, and no women died from labours of construction or carpentry. The division of gendered labour may be due to women's being at risk of danger, like being attacked, raped and losing their virginity, in doing work in the fields or outside of the home and village.

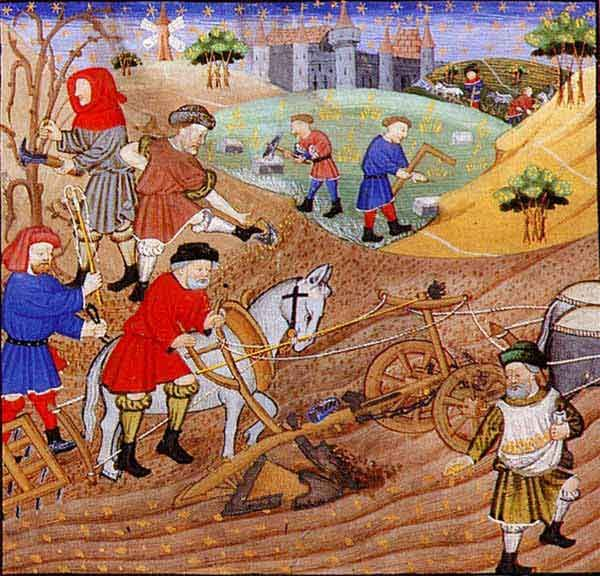
Farming

Three main activities performed by peasant men and women were planting foods, keeping livestock, and making textiles, as depicted in Psalters from southern Germany and England. Women of different classes performed different activities: rich urban women could be merchants like their husbands or even became money lenders; middle-class women worked in the textile, inn-keeping, shop-keeping, and brewing industries; while poorer women often peddled and huckstered foods and other merchandise in the market places, or worked in richer households as domestic servants, day labourers, or laundresses. Modern historians assumed that only women were assigned childcare and thus had to work near their home, yet childcare responsibilities could be fulfilled far from the home and—except breastfeeding—were not exclusive to women. In spite of the patriarchal medieval European culture, which posited female inferiority, opposed female independence, so that female workers could not contract out their labour services without their husband's' approval, widows have been recorded to act as independent economic agents; meanwhile, a married woman—mostly from among the female artisans—could, under some limited circumstances, exercise some agency as a femme sole, identified legally and economically as separate from her husband: she could learn artisan skills from her parents as their apprentice, she could work alone, conduct business, contract her labours, or even plead in law-courts.

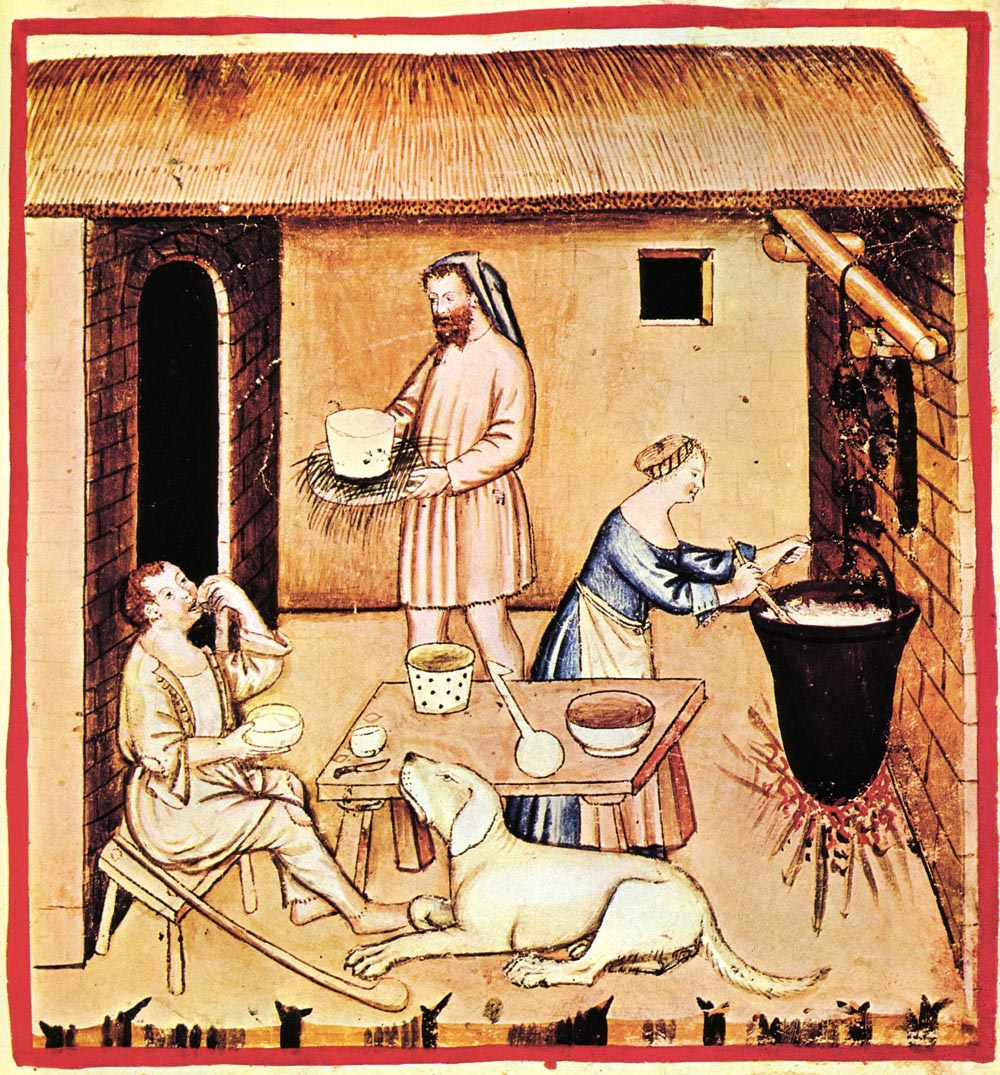
Cheesemaking

There is evidence that women performed not only housekeeping responsibilities like cooking and cleaning, but even other household activities like grinding, brewing, butchering, and spinning; and produced items like flour, ale, meat, cheese, and textile for direct consumption and for sale. An anonymous 15th-century English ballad appreciated activities performed by English peasant women such as housekeeping, making foodstuffs and textiles, and childcare. Even though cloth-making, brewing, and dairy production were trades associated with female workers, male cloth-makers and brewers increasingly displaced female workers, especially after water-mills, horizontal looms, and hop-flavoured beers were invented. These inventions favoured commercial cloth-making and brewing dominated by male workers who had more time, wealth, and access to credit and political influence and who produced goods for sale instead of for direct consumption. Meanwhile, women were increasingly relegated to low-paying tasks like spinning.

Besides working independently on their own lands, women could hire themselves out as servants or wage-workers. Medieval servants performed works as required by the employer's household: men cooked and cleaned while women did the laundry. Like their independent rural workers, rural wage-labourers performed complementary tasks based on a gendered division of labour. Women were paid only half as much as men even though both sexes performed similar tasks.

After the Black Death killed a large part of the European population and led to severe labour shortages, women filled out the occupational gaps in the cloth-making and agricultural sectors. Simon Penn argued that the labour shortages after the Black Death furnished economic opportunities for women, but Sarah Bardsley and Judith Bennett countered that women were paid about 50–75% of men's wages. Bennett attributed this gender wage gap to patriarchal prejudices which devalued women's work, yet John Hatcher disputed Bennet's claim: he pointed out that men and women received the same wages for the same piece-work, but women received lower day-wages because they were might have had to sacrifice working hours for other domestic duties. Whittle stated that the debate has not yet been settled.

To illustrate, the late medieval poem Piers Plowman paints a pitiful picture of the life of the medieval peasant woman:

Burdened with children and landlords' rent;
What they can put aside from what they make spinning they spend on housing,
Also on milk and meal to make porridge with
To sate their children who cry out for food
And they themselves also suffer much hunger,
And woe in wintertime, and waking up nights
To rise on the bedside to rock the cradle,
Also to card and comb wool, to patch and to wash,
To rub flax and reel yarn and to peel rushes
That it is pity to describe or show in rhyme
The woe of these women who live in huts;

=== Peasant women by status ===
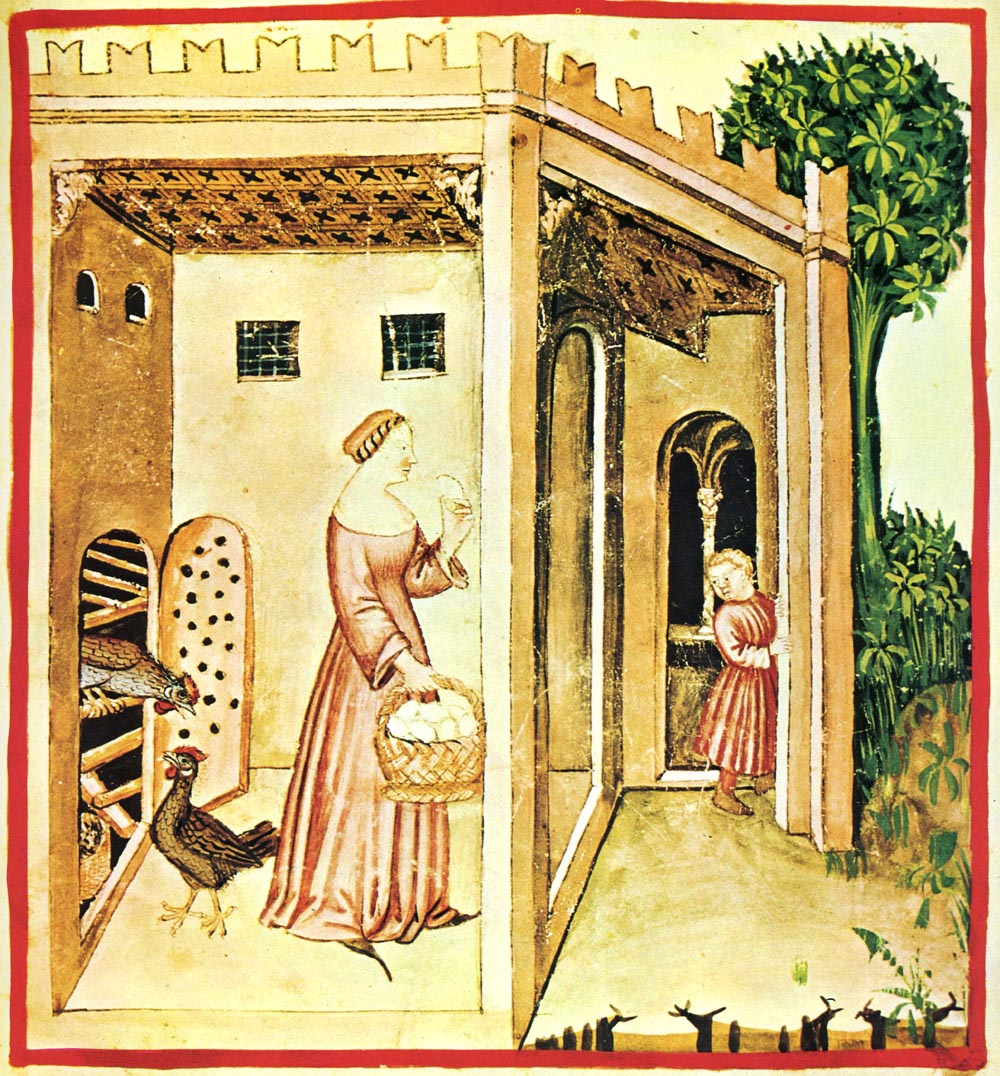
Collecting eggs

The first group of peasant women consisted of free landholders. Early records such as the Exon Domesday and Little Domesday attested that, among English land-owners, 10–14% noble thegns and non-noble free-tenants were women; and Wendy Davies found records which showed that in 54% of property transactions, women could act independently or jointly with their husbands and sons. Still, only after the 13th century are there records which better showed free female peasants' rights to land. In addition, English manorial court-rolls recorded many activities carried out by free peasants such as selling and inheriting lands, paying rents, settling upon debts and credits, brewing and selling ale, and—if unfree—rendering labour services to lords. Free peasant women, unlike their male counterparts, could not become officers such as manorial jurors, constables, and reeves.

The second category of medieval European workers were serfs. Conditions of serfdom applied to both genders. Serfs did not enjoy property rights as did free tenants: serfs were restricted from leaving their lords' lands at will and were forbidden to dispose of their assigned holdings. Both male and female serfs had to labour as part of their services to their lords and their required activities might be even specifically gendered by the lords. Many serfs also had no choice but to be controlled by their Lords, as in turn from protection from tax collectors and other protections, they were bound to them. A serf woman would pass her serfdom status to her children; in contrast, children would inherit gentry status from their father. A serf could gain freedom when released by the lord, or after having escaped from the lord's control for one year plus one day, often into towns; escaping serfs were rarely arrested.

When female serfs got married, they had to pay fines to their lords. The first fine upon a female serf getting married was known as merchet, to be paid by her father to their lord; the rationale was that the lord had lost a worker and her children. The second fine is the leyrwite, to be paid by a male or female serf who had committed sexual acts forbidden by the Church, for fear that the fornicating serf might have her marriage value lessened and thus the lord might not get the merchet.

Chris Middleton cited other historians who demonstrated that lords often regulated their serfs' marriages to make sure that the serfs' landholdings would not be taken out of their jurisdiction. Lords could even force female serfs into involuntary marriages to ensure that the female serfs would be able to pro-create a new generation of workers. Over time, English lords increasingly favoured primogeniture inheritance patterns to prevent their serfs' landholdings from being broken up.

== Medieval urban women ==
The majority of the population in Medieval Europe lived in the countryside or in small towns. While Urban women in the middle ages were a minority, their situation of Urban city women were quite different from that of both elite noblewomen or rural peasant women, both of whom lived or had their main base in the countryside. Women were generally prohibited from acting as elected town officials. However, urban woman regardless of class were normally free women, and not slaves or serfs. There were a normal custom and law that a serf who had lived inside city borders a specific time period would be free.

=== Labour ===
In the cities, many professions were monopolised by the guilds. Each person who wished to work in a certain profession, must have a permission or membership of a guild. The terms of the guilds could differ between different countries, different cities and different professions. There were guilds that allowed female members. The typical guild only allowed full male members, but did allow the widow of a guild member to continue in the profession or business of her late husband, in which she had often assisted during his lifetime. There were also professions outside of the guilds, which were easier to access for women.

A woman's standing as a worker varied depending on circumstances. Generally, women were required to have male guardians who would assume legal liability for them in legal and economic matters. For the wives of elite merchants in Northern Europe, their roles extended to commercial undertakings both with their husbands and on their own, however in Italy, tradition and law excluded them from commerce; in Ghent, women were required to have guardians unless these women had been emancipated or were prestigious merchants; Norman women were forbidden to contract business ventures; French women could litigate business matters, but could not plead in courts without their husbands, unless they had suffered from their husbands' abuses; Castilian wives, during the Reconquista, enjoyed favourable legal treatments, worked in family-oriented trades and crafts, sold goods, kept inns and shops, became domestic servants for wealthier households; Christian Castilian wives laboured along with Jewish and Muslim free-born women and slaves. Yet over time Castilian wives' work became associated with or even subordinated to that of their husbands, and when the Castilian frontier region had been stabilized, Castilian wives' legal standing deteriorated.

After the Black Death killed a large part of the European population and led to severe labour shortages, women filled out the occupational gaps in the cloth-making.

== Health ==
Peasant women during the time period were subjected to a number of superstitious practices when it came to their health. In The Distaff Gospels, a collection of 15th-century French women's lore, advice for women's health was plentiful. "For a fever, write the first 3 words of the Our Father on a sage leaf, eat it in the morning for 3 days and you will be cured."

Male involvement with women's healthcare was widespread. However, there were limits to male participation because of the resistance to males' viewing women's genitalia. During most encounters with male medical practitioners, women remained clothed because viewing a women's body was considered shameful.

=== Trotula: Women's Medicinal Compendium ===
The Trotula, written between the eleventh and twelfth century, was an all encompassing treatise that provided an explanation and remedies for various women's health conditions as well as general health and beauty tips.

==== Menstruation in the Trotula ====
The first book of the treatise, Book on the Conditions of Women, began with an explanation of men and women's Galenic disposition. Men were hot and dry which allowed them to burn up illness and dry out excessive humors or they could labor and sweat out excessive humors. Conversely, women were cold and wet. As a result, they were not hot enough to destroy illness and were more susceptible to negative health issues. Additionally, women were too weak to labor therefore sweating was not a viable option for releasing excess humors. As a result, the author explained that women purged their excess humors via menstruation.

Menstruation was not supposed to be a negative experience if the proper cycle of humoral relief happened. Two main menstruation related conditions discussed in, Book on the Conditions of Women, was heavy bleeding (menorrhagia) and lack of bleeding (amenorrhea). The symptoms for irregular menstruation was dysentery, edema, heart pangs, fever, lack of appetite, vomiting, desire to consume non-food items, and pain that radiated at various parts throughout the body. There were a variety of things that would cause those symptoms such as sweating too much, having blood that was congealed, or thick and coagulated humors stuck in one's uterus. Another reason women lacked periods was because blood left through a bloody nose, hemorrhoids, or spit as opposed to the uterus. Finally, women could also lose their periods from too much fear, anger, or irritation. The authors of the Trotula understood that women could temporarily lose their periods for short durations but did believe that it was a sign of bad health if women had not had a period for a long time.

In the section, On Retention of Menses, a variety of remedies are offered for women experiencing amenorrhea. General remedies ranged from bleeding women from their feet, drinking various herbs cooked in water or soaked in wine, vaginal steaming, warm wet herb compresses placed or pounded against the stomach, or phallic shaped objects made of cotton that were either soaked in herb mixtures or packed with herb mixtures and inserted into the vagina.

In the section, On Excessive Flux of the Menses, the author explained that the primary cause of menorrhagia was "corrupt humors" that cause blood to get too hot and burst out of the vessels. Additionally, other humors like bile could be abundant and boil the blood or phlegm which loosen it and result into its rapid expulsion. Similarly, over indulgence of food and drink could rupture the vessels as well. General remedies ranged from bleeding women from their arm or hand, consuming various salty or pickled foods, consuming herbs that would manage bile and phlegm, or cupping the body to extract blood.

==== Uterine Health in the Trotula ====
In the section, On Suffocation of the Womb, the author explained that at times the uterus can go up into the torso. This was because the woman's body contained too much female semen and the common victims were widows and older virgins. The typical symptoms were syncope, loss of appetite, lack of voice or vision, and stooping in pain. Together amenorrhea and excess semen wreaked havoc on the body. The offered cures were anointing the hands, feet, and vagina with oil and smelling foul things. Women could also use powdered fox or deer penis as a pessary.

In the section, On Descent of the Womb, uterine prolapse is explained. Women can either experience a partial or full prolapse. The cause could be as simple as being too cold from water, air, or sitting down on icy stones or as complex as weakened internal structures and postpartum complications. The common remedies for a partial prolapse was to smell herbs, anoint the body, or drink medicinal wine. In extreme cases of full prolapse, the uterus could be manually pushed back into the body. The women should, then, sit and fumigate her vagina over steam. Additionally, women would be advised to consume astringent food, cold food, or even powdered deer heart with herbs in wine.

In the section, On Lesions of the Womb, the author explained that the humors: cold, yellow bile, and red bile, could all cause their own unique lesions and pain inside the body such as in the vagina and uterus. Similarly, illness that migrated into the reproductive organs or excessive menstrual bleeding could also be responsible. Cold humors caused heaviness and discomfort in the lower half of the body. Red bile caused extreme pain, fever, and thirst. Yellow bile was associated with fever as well as cancer. Depending on the location, type of pain, and symptoms women were recommended a variety of remedies. For example, they could create a pessary of animals parts, honey, herbs, and a woman's milk, use ointments, take baths, or eat specialty diets that were curated for their particular humoral imbalance. If heat was responsible blood letting, cold foods, or pain relief ointment was the solution.

=== Childbirth ===
Obstetrics in the Middle Ages evolved during the period with prominent authors such as Avicenna, Muscio, Savonarola, and Scipione including some content about women's health in their treatises.

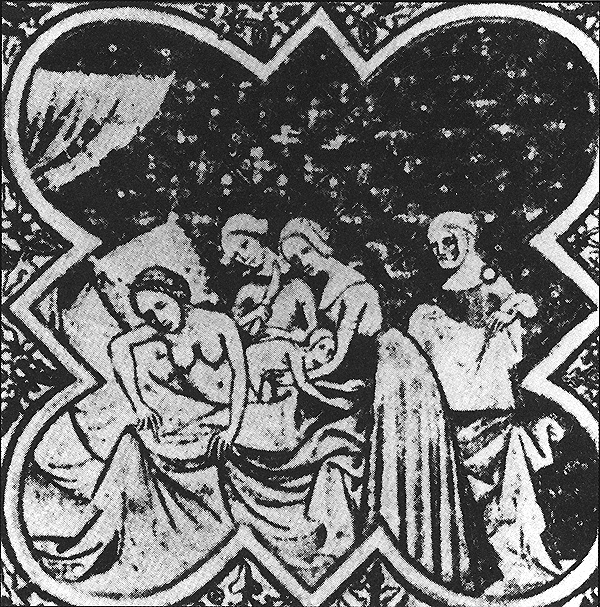
Cesarean section performed on a living woman by a female practitioner. Miniature from a fourteenth-century "Historie Ancienne."

The Trotula, written between the eleventh and twelfth century, was a popular treatise that provided an explanation for women's afflictions in childbirth and various remedies for labor and delivery. Their pain was a direct reflection of their Galenic disposition, cold and moist, which predisposed them to illness. The provided methods for women to relieve their pain during birth were herbs and physical activities.

Childbirth was treated as the most important aspect of women's health during the period; however, few historical texts document the experience. Women attendants assisted in childbirth and passed their experiences to one another. In addition to serving as midwives or nuns, women also served in other scattered capacities ranging from physicians to empirical healers, even when they unequaled compared to roles men held, they still found a way to serve in important capacities. Midwives, women who attended childbirth, were acknowledged as legitimate medical specialists and were granted a special role in women's health care. There is Roman documentation in Latin works evidencing the professional role of midwives and their involvement with gynaecological care.

=== Diet ===
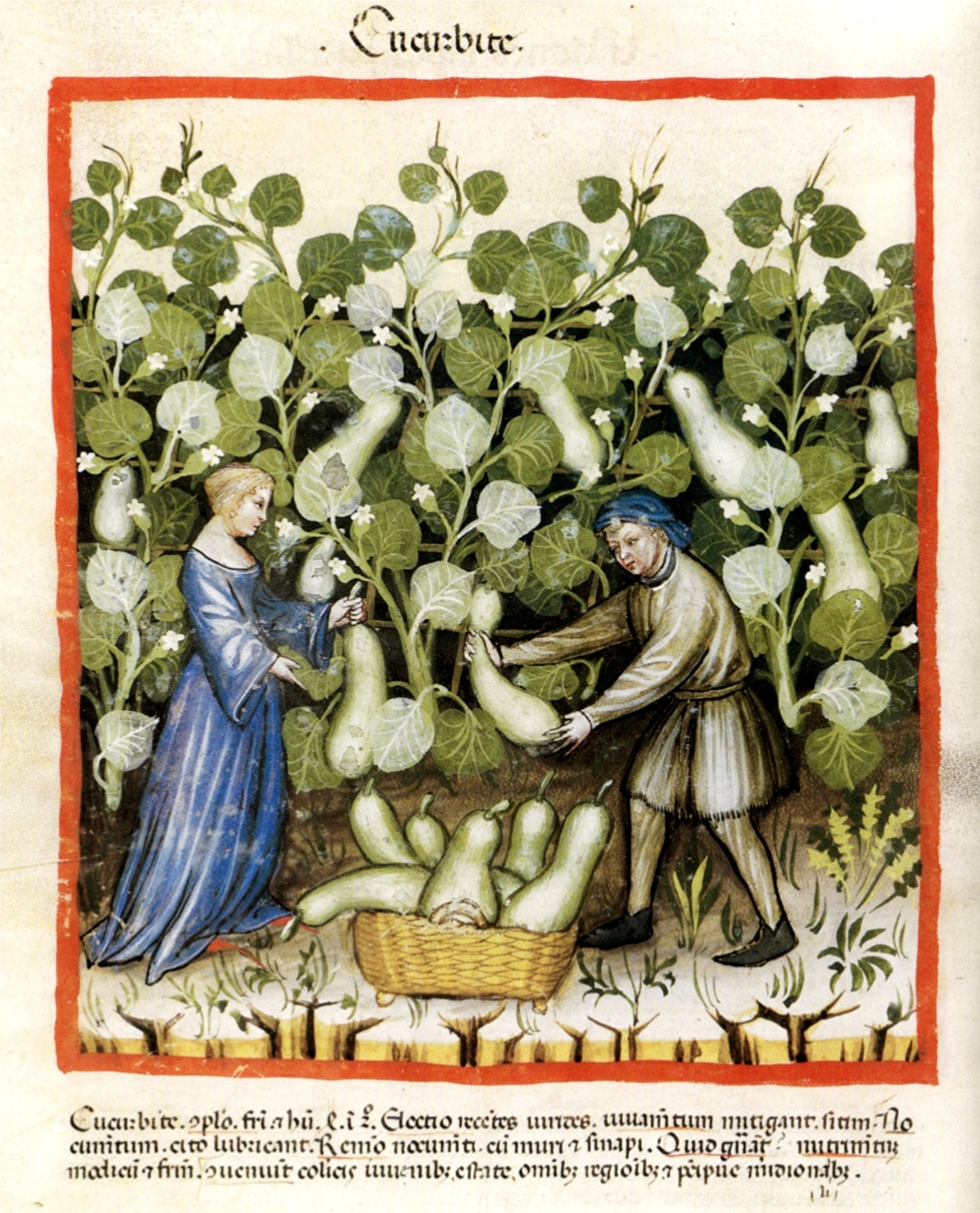
Harvesting squash

Just as Classical Greco-Roman writers, including Aristotle, Pliny the Elder, and Galen, assumed that men lived longer than women, medieval Catholic bishop Albertus Magnus agreed that in general men lived longer, but he observed that some women live longer and posited that it was per accidens, thanks to the purification resulting from menstruation and that women worked less but also consumed less than men. Modern historians Bullough and Campbell instead attribute high female mortality during the Middle Ages to deficiency in iron and protein as a result of the diet during the Roman period and the early Middle Ages. Medieval peasants subsisted upon grain-heavy, protein-poor and iron-poor diets, eating breads of wheat, barley, and rye dipped in broth, and rarely enjoying nutritious supplements like cheese, eggs, and wine. Physiologically speaking, women require at least twice as much iron as men because women inevitably lose iron through menstrual discharge as well as to events related to child bearing, including fetal needs; bleeding during childbirth, miscarriage, and abortion; and lactation. As the human body better absorbs iron from liver, iron salts, and meat than from grains and vegetables, the grain-heavy medieval diet commonly resulted in iron deficiency and, by extension, general anemia for medieval women. However, anemia was not the leading cause of death for women; rather anemia, which lessens the amount of hemoglobin in blood, would further aggravate such other diseases as pneumonia, bronchitis, emphysema, and heart diseases.

Since the 800s, the invention of a more efficient type of plough—along with three-field replacing two-field crop rotation—allowed medieval peasants to improve their diets through planting, alongside wheat and rye in the fall, oats, barley, and legumes in the spring, including various protein-rich peas. In the same period, rabbits were introduced from the Iberian Peninsula across the Alps to the Carolingian Empire, reaching England in the 12th century. Herring could be more effectively salted, and pork, cheese, and eggs were increasingly consumed throughout Europe, even by the lower classes. As a result, Europeans of all classes consumed more proteins from meats than did people in any other part of the world during the same period—leading to population growth that almost outstripped resources at the onset of the devastating Black Death. Bullough and Campbell further cite David Herlihy, who observes, based on available data, that in European cities in the 15th century, women outnumbered men, and although they did not have the "absolute numerical advantage over men," women were more numerous among the elderly. A noteworthy difference with in the population of men and women is that women under the age of fifteen outnumbered men 105 to 99. However, over the age of fifteen and still unmarried men outnumbered women. Many women were married at a younger age, which contributed to those numbers. This is important while considering medical treatment of the time which often proved to be misogynistic in nature.

== Landownership ==
To prosper, medieval Europeans needed rights to own land, dwellings, and goods.

Land-ownership involved various inheritance patterns, according to the potential heir's gender across the landscape of medieval Western Europe. Primogeniture prevailed in England, Normandy, and the Basque region: In the Basque region, the eldest child—regardless of sex—inherited all lands. In Normandy, only sons could inherit lands. In England, the eldest son usually inherited all properties, but sometimes sons inherited jointly, daughters would inherit only if there were no sons. In Scandinavia, sons received twice as much as daughters' inheritance, yet siblings of the same sex received equal shares. In northern France, Brittany, and the Holy Roman Empire, sons and daughters enjoyed partible inheritance: each child would receive an equal share regardless of sex (but Parisian parents could favour some children over others).

Female land-owners, single or married, could grant or sell land as they deemed fit. Women managed the estates when their husbands left for war, political affairs, and pilgrimages. Nevertheless, as time passed, women were increasingly given, as dowries, movable properties such as good and cash instead of land. Even though up the year 1000 female landownership had been increasing, afterwards female landownership began to decline. Commercialization also contributed to the decline in female landownership as more women left the countryside to work for wages as servants or day labourers. Medieval widows independently managed and cultivated their deceased husbands' lands. Overall, widows were preferred over children to inherit lands: indeed, English widows would receive one third of the couples' shared properties, but in Normandy widows could not inherit.

Notable examples of women landowners in England in the Middle Ages include: countess Gytha, mother of Harold Godwinson, who held lands across the south west of England; Asa, who held land in Yorkshire; and Judith, who owned large amounts of land in the East Midlands (all three women and their claims are recorded in the Domesday Book); and Margaret de Neville, who owned extensive lands in 13th-14th century Yorkshire.

== Law ==
Cultural differences across Western and Eastern Europe meant that laws were neither universal nor universally practised. The Laws of the Salian Franks, a Germanic tribe that migrated into Gaul and converted to Christianity between the 6th and 7th centuries, provide a well-known example of a particular tribe's law codes. According to Salic Law, crimes and determined punishments were usually orated; however as their contact with literate Romans increased, their laws became codified and developed into written language and text. Other examples of women appearing in legal records come from court leet jurisdiction and borough ordinances in England where they are frequently cited for crimes involving labor, theft, and even occasionally for murder.

Peasants, slaves, and maidservants were considered as property of their free-born master(s). In some or perhaps most cases, the unfree person might be regarded as of the same value as their master's animals. However, peasants, slaves, and maidservants of the king were regarded as more valuable and even considered to be of the same value as free persons because they were members of the king's court.

=== Crimes concerning abduction ===
If someone were to abduct another person's slave or maidservant and were proven to have committed the crime, that individual would be responsible to pay 35 solidi, the value of the slave, and in addition a fine for lost time of use. If someone abducted another person's maidservant, the abductor would be fined 30 solidi. A proven seducer of a maidservant worth 15 or 25 solidi, and who is himself worth 25 solidi, would be fined 72 solidi plus the value of the maidservant. The proven abductor of a boy or girl domestic servant will be fined the value of the servant (25 or 35 solidi) plus an additional amount for lost time of use.

=== Crimes concerning free-born persons marrying slaves ===
A free-born woman who marries a slave will lose her freedom and privileges as a free-born woman. She will also have her property taken away from her and will be proclaimed an outlaw. A free-born man who marries a slave or maidservant shall also lose his freedom and privilege as a free-born man.

=== Crimes concerning fornication with slaves or maidservants ===
If a freeman fornicates with another person's maidservant and is proven to have done so, he will be required to pay the maidservant's master 15 solidi. If anyone fornicates with a maidservant of the king and proven to do so, the fine would be 30 solidi. If a slave fornicates with another person's maidservant and that maidservant dies, the slave will be fined and also be required to pay the maidservant's master 6 solidi and may be castrated; or that slave's master will be required to pay the maidservant's master the value of the deceased maidservant. If a slave fornicates with a maidservant who does not die, the slave will either receive three hundred lashes or be required to pay the maidservant's master 3 solidi. If a slave marries another person's maidservant without her master's consent, the slave will either be whipped or required to pay the maidservant's master 3 solidi.

=== Crimes concerning labor ===
There is evidence in the Leet Jurisdiction in the City of Norwich from the 13th and 14th centuries that women were charged with breaking the assize of ale as well as keeping back money from the sale of corn. Women were also cited with buying corn outside of the city walls where taxes were not collected and either keeping it for their families or re-selling it and making an illegal profit. Women listed as bakers, poulterers, brewers, and books were also cited as transgressors of borough ordinances in York in 1301. One study found that women were more involved in crimes against the market in one particular town in England after the Black Plague than they were before.

== Civil discourse of women ==
Although many women served in more traditional roles, and it was mainly men who had a more influential hold over society, that does not mean women did not participate in civil discourse. Even though the voices of women were heavily suppressed due to society's undemocratic nature, they still had a voice through writing, or in courts or synod. Although there are not many interpretations available on women's civic practices, it is believed that they participated heavily through writings and letters, a quieter way of participation.

== Involvement in the Church ==
Women had much involvement in the church as religion is very important to the Middle Ages. However, one of the most prominent roles a woman could be in the church was serving as a nun or working in a hospital (mostly nuns as well). Women generally participated in the church in a different way than men would, as well as having different beliefs, such as purifying women after birth, or denying communion to menstruating women. Many ideas were conceptualized by men about women in the church which led to such treatment because of gender roles.

== Difference between Western and Eastern Europe ==
The status of women differed immensely by region. In most of Western Europe, later marriage and higher rates of definitive celibacy (the so-called "European marriage pattern") helped to constrain patriarchy at its most extreme level. The rise of Christianity and manorialism had both created incentives to keep families nuclear and thus the age of marriage increased; the Western Church instituted marriage laws and practices that undermined large kinship groups. From as early as the 4th century, the Church discouraged any practice that enlarged the family, like adoption, polygamy, taking concubines, divorce, and remarriage. The Church severely discouraged and prohibited consanguineous marriages, a marriage pattern that has constituted a means to maintain clans (and thus their power) throughout history. The church also forbade marriages in which the bride did not clearly agree to the union. After the Fall of Rome, manorialism also helped to weaken the ties of kinship and thus the power of clans; as early as the 9th century in Austrasia, families that worked on manors were small, consisting of parents and children and occasionally a grandparent. The Church and state had become allies in erasing the solidarity and thus the political power of the clans; the Church sought to replace traditional religion, whose vehicle was the kin group, and substituting the authority of the elders of the kin group with that of a religious elder; at the same time, the king's rule was undermined by revolts on the part of the most powerful kin groups, clans or sections, whose conspiracies and murders threatened the power of the state and also the demand of manorial lords for obedient, compliant workers. As the peasants and serfs lived and worked on farms that they rented from the lord of the manor, they also needed the permission of the lord to marry; couples therefore had to comply with the lord and wait until a small farm became available before they could marry and thus produce children. Those who could and did delay marriage presumably were rewarded by the landlord and those who did not were presumably denied said reward. For example, Medieval England saw the marriage age as variable depending on economic circumstances, with couples delaying marriage until the early twenties when times were bad and frequently marrying in the late teens after the Black Death, when there were labour shortages and it was economically lucrative to workers; by appearances, marriage of adolescents was not the norm in England.

In Eastern Europe however, there were many differences with specific regional characteristics. In the Byzantine Empire and Bulgarian Empire, the majority of women were well educated and had a higher social status than in Western Europe. Equality in family relations and the right to common property after marriage were recognized by law with the Byzantine Ekloge ton nomon and the Slavic Zakon Sudnyi Liudem in Bulgaria in the 9th century. In some parts of Russia the tradition of early and universal marriage (usually of a bride age 12–15, with menarche occurring on average at 14) as well as traditional Slavic patrilocal customs led to a greatly inferior status for women at all levels of society. In rural South Slavic areas, a custom of women marrying men younger than themselves, in some cases only after the age of thirty, remained until the 19th century. The manorial system had yet to penetrate into Eastern Europe where there was a lesser effect on clan systems and no firm enforcement of bans on cross-cousin marriages. Orthodox laws banned marriages between relatives closer than third and fourth cousins.

== See also ==
- Ancillae
- Female education (Medieval)
- Medieval literature (Women's)
- Medieval female sexuality
- Prostitution (Middle Ages)
- Women artists (Medieval)
- Women in Judaism (Middle Ages)
- Women in science (Medieval)
- Timeline of women in medieval warfare
- Clothing:
  - Early medieval European dress
  - 1100–1200 in European fashion
  - 1200–1300 in European fashion
  - 1300–1400 in European fashion
  - 1400–1500 in European fashion
