= Medieval female sexuality =

Medieval female sexuality is the collection of sexual and sensual characteristics identified in a woman from the Middle Ages. Like a modern woman, a medieval woman's sexuality included many different aspects. Sexuality does not only refer to a woman's sexual activity, as sexual lives were as social, cultural, legal, and religious as they were personal.

== Virginity ==
Sexuality for the medieval woman began before marriage as a young virgin, mainly among elites whose mothers would arrange marriages. Marriage between nobles was often primarily an economic institution, traditionally based on politics, material wealth, and social status. However, it was not unheard of for young men and women to create relationships for themselves with sexual attraction in mind. Women displayed their availability for marriage through their hair, which would have been a great symbol of sexuality in the Middle Ages and was often kept hidden after marriage. Medieval women allowed their hair to grow throughout their lives. Married women would have kept their long hair tied up in braids beneath a head covering of some sort. Single women would allow their hair to fall freely over their bodies signaling that they were available for marriage.

The medieval values on virginity was a social construction, and memories of virgins was commonplace in popular stories, lyrics, romances, and poems, as well as biblical drama, sermons, and illuminated manuscripts. There are large swaths of secular records that reveal medieval society's conflicting attitudes towards fornication outside of marriage, where "losing ones virginity" was in certain instances harshly punished, especially when resulting in pregnancy: "John the son of Nicholas the clerk fornicated ridiculously with Julia Redes. Both appear, confess, and are whipped once in the usual way through the market. The woman is pregnant."

A similar passage speaks of one William Trumpour, who fornicated with Joan de Gyldesum in 1363:

She confessed the article and abjured the sin on penalty of six whippings. She has three whippings for her confession. The woman said that the man betrothed her and promised to marry her as his wife. The man denied this on oath and immediately after promised on oath that if he should henceforth know her carnally, he would thereafter have her and hold her as his wife. The woman likewise promised that if hereafter she should allow him to know her carnally, she would have him as her husband.

However, it seems that such drastic measures to ensure public morality were rarer in this period than later times; premarital sex was tolerated publicly to a far greater level than adultery. According to The Decameron Web,

"...[I]t appears that unrestrained sexual activity was quite common throughout Europe during these times. In fact, most did not believe fornication was a sin at all, and many were taken by surprise at confession when priests informed them that they had indeed sinned by committing certain sexual acts. St. Vincent Ferrer (1350-1419) claimed that by age fifteen, all young men had lost their virginity...although premarital sex was obviously considered sinful by the church, in reality, once couples were betrothed, they often slept together during a sort of "trial period" before the wedding. That way, if one or both were not satisfied with the results, they might still attempt to release themselves from future consent to marry (sometimes by becoming godparents of the same child, a relationship which would lead to an incestuous union)."

Much popular medieval literature lampooned the supposed moral laxity of the lower and middle classes, especially the peasantry; revealing that such antics were considered amusing and not usually severely frowned upon. The common belief was that "rural populations were much more accepting of illicit sexual behavior, and that country folk were viewed as much more "free" sexually than urban dwellers." For instance, Geoffrey Chaucer's The Canterbury Tales includes many such passages that still have the ability to shock today and would have been extremely taboo in the more recent Victorian Era.

Still, the emphasis on virginity existed to a far greater degree for women than it did men. It was certainly possible for a woman to lose her virginity and be considered holy, as evident through the proliferation of "Saintly Queens" during the High Middle Ages: these women often were praised for dedicating their lives to good works and charity. An outstanding example is Queen Matilda of Scotland, first wife of King Henry I, who was described as "a woman of exceptional holiness, in piety her mother's rival, and in her own character exempt from all evil influence." However, if a woman was not a virgin she was less likely to be considered for sainthood.

== Marriage and rape ==
Once married, the importance of fidelity directly related to a woman's honor and her acknowledgment of male control of her sexuality. A man was supposed to transform his wife from a virgin to a woman by consummating the marriage, ideally with a pregnancy. While an unconsummated marriage was subject to annulment, once a woman lost her virginity to her husband, the consummated marriage was permanent.

Sexual problems within a marriage, especially in explanation to an unconsummated marriage, existed in a woman's claim of her husband's impotence and inability to penetrate her or in a man's claim that his wife's vagina was too narrow or that it was somehow blocked. According to accepted Hippocratic thought in medicine, conception could only happen if a woman felt pleasure during sex, so the law tended to equate pleasure with consent.

Laws on sex within marriage were skewed against women, and they were generally also written by the Church. Concerning consent, once a man and woman were married for two months, "ecclesiastical authorities would uphold the husband's right to consummate the marriage." So, exchanging consent between spouses was enough to legally bind a marriage according to the Church. While parental consent, the presence of a witness, and/or an officiating priest was important to declaring marriage complete, it was really sexual consent that mattered. However, the German Schwabenspiegel allowed a woman over twenty-five to engage in sexual activity without her father's consent or threat of the loss of inheritance. To complicate this matter, Salic Law prevented women from inheriting land, reign, and property from the baseline in many kingdoms around Western Europe.

Consent was assumed and declared forever after two months of the marriage, so it was impossible for a married woman to be legally raped by her husband. Rape in the eyes of the law was a huge problem for women who were assaulted. According to a Yorkshire Peace Session in 1363, Elias Warner of Malton feloniously raped Ellen Katemayden of Malton "and lay with her against her will and assaulted her and so battered her that she died within the next three days (...) Elias, brought by the sheriff, came before the justices. The jurors (...) say on their oath that the aforesaid Elias is in no way guilty of the aforesaid felony... Therefore it is judged that the aforesaid Elias is acquitted thereof, etc." This is but one example of medieval men being acquitted for rapes, kidnappings, and assaults. Secular and Church courts did little to protect women when it came to sexual violence, especially if the woman became pregnant.

== Medical perceptions of sexuality ==
In the Christian medieval world, some theories held that women received far more pleasure from a sexual encounter than men, and had much greater sexual appetite. As a result, some churchmen taught that men took more responsibility for sexual sin than women, since women were "weaker" and less biologically capable of resisting their urges. However, this could also be used as a reason to keep women under stricter control than men. Women commonly dealt with a double standard in how their sexuality was treated in comparison to men.

Medieval Christian philosophy told women that, as the daughters of Eve, they are responsible for the fall of mankind due to their innate sin, and this generalized scorn seeped into every facet of their lives, including sexuality. Moreover, religious prejudice against women and female sexuality seeped into legal, intellectual, and medical knowledge.

Medical knowledge of the time drew on the ideas on third-century writer Galen, and held that women's wombs were "cold," and required the heat of men's seed both to conceive and for general health. The weakness of women in resisting their physical desires was an obstacle in conception, since they would ignore the ideal conditions to conceive, and over-indulgence in sex could inflame female desire so that women were insatiable. It was important to have sex in moderation to ensure health and fulfillment of its reproductive purpose. It was believed that unmarried women should find a husband as quickly as possible, or risk serious health consequences. Unmarried women who were hindered by their lust were told to exercise regularly and take medicines. If she had a fainting fit, one text by John of Gaddesden recommended that they should find a midwife who would insert an oiled finger, a laurel, or a spikenard into her vagina, and "move it vigorously about."

Medieval Christian writers recognized women's sexual pleasure and many thought that in order to conceive a child, a woman had to achieve orgasm. This belief came from the Galenic model of reproduction, which held that conception occurred due to the union of male and female "seed," both of which were emitted in response to sexual pleasure. This meant that the sexual satisfaction of women was considered important. However, because of this belief, the conception of a child due to rape was often taken as evidence that the woman enjoyed the assault. Some other writers disagreed, maintaining that physical pleasure could occur even when the mind was not consenting. Largely, the woman's consent was not what defined rape, however, but rather whether the perpetrator had stepped outside of the boundaries that entitled him to sex; a married woman could not be raped by her husband, because as her husband he had a right to sex with her.

== Canon law and secular courts ==
The laws of the Catholic Church and the secular laws of the medieval period mixed into, generally, one united front. Whatever would have been a concern for the Church, was automatically reflected in the concern of the secular court. The ultimate purity for the Church was for one to maintain virginity throughout one's life, but if one must have a sexual life, it would then only be legitimate for procreation through marriage. The sin of women's sexual immorality, love of extravagant dress, and petulant nature were common themes of medieval sermons.

Many restrictions theoretically limited the circumstances in which sexual activity was permissible to engage in. For example, sex was a forbidden activity during the following times: Sundays, sometimes Fridays and Wednesdays, the feast days of the saints, periods of fasting such as Lent or Advent, and during a woman's life when she was considered to be impure. Impurity was believed to be during menstruation, pregnancy, the first forty days after giving birth, and while nursing. Since the goal for a woman was to give birth to as many children as possible and nurse them all into good health, a woman, given the set restrictions, would not have had much time to engage in sexual activity.

The sexual activities considered moral in the Christian world were those that were believed to facilitate conception. The normative sexual encounter positioned the man on top, though the woman did not necessarily have to be supine. Non-procreative sexual acts were considered sodomy; the charge of sodomy was so serious that it would have been tried in the secular court and possibly been subject to a death sentence.

However, evidence of practices that were likely to prevent or terminate a pregnancy demonstrate that contraception was understood and commonly used. Women used potions, amulets, and concoctions of herbs and spices to prevent pregnancies. Some handbooks giving advice on how to ensure fertility are so detailed in their descriptions of what should be avoided for a woman that wants to conceive, that they may have been surreptitiously providing contraceptive advice.

The positions of medieval theologians and church officials on the issues of contraception and abortion were not uniform; in fact, they often held opposing views. Some church leaders, such as John Chrysostom, the archbishop of Constantinople, condemned the use of contraceptives and even compared the practice to murder. However, a common position held by religious authorities and theologians was that of toleration. Some determined that embryos could not be recognized as individuals until further in development when they begin to develop "recognizable human features." The period between conception and these later developments of the fetus was considered an appropriate time to induce an abortion. In some canon law, the motivation behind the practice of using contraception or inducing an abortion was an important factor in determining the degree of sin the woman was committing. A woman who had an abortion due to the inability to properly care for the child was not considered to be as sinful as a woman who was using the abortion to hide evidence of adultery or premarital sex.

Another large piece of female sexuality of concern for the courts was that of prostitution. A woman selling sexual services during the Middle Ages was, in theory, frowned upon by the Church as committing a sin, but in principle and in practice, the authorities believed that prostitution was a necessary evil and a public utility for preventing men from worse sins.

There was no singular approach to prostitution in medieval Europe; the manner in which it was addressed varied by town. Each town usually addressed prostitution either by making it illegal, regulating and taxing the exchange of sexual services, or institutionalizing it by establishing municipal brothels. These brothels would usually have strict regulations for the owners, employees (such as bookkeepers), and the prostitutes. These regulations included laws which determined the business hours of the brothel, the amount of pay prostitutes were entitled to, when they were allowed to leave, and whom they were allowed to have personal relationships with. Some laws, however, worked in the prostitutes' favor, such as laws that protected them from violence committed by the brothel owners.

The establishment of these brothels was justified using the argument that it was the "lesser evil." By giving men the option of engaging in sex with a prostitute, it was believed to be saving esteemed women from corruption, rape, and sodomy. It was also believed that making attractive women available for men to have intercourse with would curtail homosexual practices. Essentially, the regulation and legalization of prostitution was not for the benefit of the prostitutes' well-being, but for the good of the townspeople.

== Medieval lesbianism ==
The history of medieval women's sexuality and lesbianism is not well-documented and seldomly acknowledged due to lesbianism being underplayed or ignored compared to male homosexuality in the medieval time period. More often, medieval physicians discussed male homosexuality in greater detail than lesbianism in handbooks that detailed religious confessions, and many theologians also overlooked same sex relations between women as well. According to historian Joan Cadden, this "invisibility" of women's same sex relations is in part due to the subordinate place of all women in the Middle Ages, who are seen as lesser and easily overlooked compared to their male counterparts.

There are many examples of queer sexuality among medieval women, and its evidence traditionally comes from Canonical and secular law codes. While they do not reveal the lived experiences of medieval lesbian and lesbian-like women, they give insight into norms on gendered sexuality and homosexuality. Gendered sexuality in the Middle Ages came from Greco-Roman views of male and female sexuality. The most important aspect of this difference lays within a sexual hierarchy:

If a man submitted to a passive role in lovemaking, particularly by allowing penetration in a homosexual encounter. (It was perfectly acceptable to be the active partner in a homosexual relationship, since that preserved the all-important gender definition equating activity with masculinity. Oral sexuality with a female partner was much condemned since it, too, inverted the social hierarchy.

Lesbian relationships challenged this sexual hierarchy, but it was not considered as dangerous as male homosexuality. Many male writers, often within the church, found sex without male genitalia hard to imagine. So, they often assumed lesbian sex could only exist if women used sexual instruments like dildos; only then would they be challenging the sexual hierarchy. In a letter from Saint Augustine to a community of nuns around 423CE, Augustine condemned sex and distinguishes between homoerotic activity and homosocial relationships that could be viewed in a more positive light:

The love between you, however, ought not to be earthly but spiritual, for the things which shameless women do even to other women in low jokes and games are to be avoided not only by widows and chaste handmaids of Christ, living under a holy rule of life, but also entirely by married women and maidens destined for marriage.

The Penitential of Theodore punished lesbian activity, but they did not have the words to describe lesbian identities: "If a woman practices vice with a woman, she shall do penance for three years. (...) If she practices solitary vice, she shall do penance for the same period." Both of these pieces of canonical rhetoric and practice reveal that lesbian women existed and were known, but they did not possess the language to describe it. There were not many explicit definitions of lesbianism, especially as an identity, but these sources do reveal its existence. An interesting prescriptive source on convent life by Donatus (d. 355) shows how some clerics feared that affection would lead to lesbian sexual expression. He declares through a rule on how nuns ought to sleep:

Each should sleep in a separate bed and they should accept bedding according to the arrangements of the couches as the mother directs. If possible all should sleep in one place (...) Lights should burn in each chamber until day-break. They should sleep clothed, their girdles bound and always ready for divine service with gravity and modesty. (...) Nuns were to sleep together, with a complete lack of privacy, while at the same time they should sleep alone, without an occasion to touch a sister, or see a sister naked.

A record from sixteenth-century Seville warned that lesbian women in prison who used dildos and hard language on other women (again, lesbian sex was not considered sex if there was not an instrument) could receive up to 200 lashes and be exiled. Lesbianism was punished, but records of this punishment prove its existence and lesbian experiences as valid in the greater context of human history.

Although much of what is known about medieval lesbianism comes from law codes, there is some additional evidence of romantic relationships between women during this period which provide a closer look into their personal lives. One such source is a collection of poems written by a woman to her female lover which were recovered from a twelfth-century manuscript from the monastery of Tegernsee. John Boswell, a historian of medieval sexuality, considers this poem to be "perhaps the most outstanding example of medieval lesbian literature.". One of the poems discusses themes of awaiting her woman lover's return, recalling intimate moments, and grieving her absence daily. It also depicts the author and her lovers' relationship as a physically intimate one, not just an emotional bond.

== See also ==
- Courtly love
- Eleanor Rykener
- History of the Catholic Church and homosexuality § Medieval and Early Modern period
- History of Christianity and homosexuality
- Homosexuality in medieval Europe
- Women in the Middle Ages
- Single women in the Middle Ages
