= Hajnal (name) =

- Gender: feminine
- Language: Hungarian
- Name day: March 27

Origin
- Language: Hungarian
- Meaning: "dawn"; diminutive version Hajnalka means "morning glory"

Other names
- Variant form: Hajnalka
- Nickname: Hajni
- Anglicisation: Dawn

Hajnal is both a Hungarian surname and a female given name. It means 'dawn' in Hungarian, the first light of daybreak. Diminutive Hajnalka is also used as a female given name; it is also the Hungarian word for morning glory. Notable people with Hajnal either as a surname or given name:

Surname:

- András Hajnal (1931–2016), Hungarian mathematician
- István Hajnal (1892–1956), Hungarian historian
- Ivo Hajnal (born 1961), Swiss–Austrian linguist
- János Hajnal (1913–2010), Hungarian-born artist and illustrator based in Italy
- John Hajnal (1926–2008), Hungarian-British mathematician and professor of statistics
- Tamás Hajnal (born 1981), Hungarian footballer

Given name:

- Hajnal Andréka (born 1947), Hungarian mathematician
- Hajnal Ban (born 1977), Australian lawyer and politician
