= John Hajnal =

Hungarian-British mathematician and statistician (1924–2008)

- Born: 26 November 1924; Darmstadt, Hesse, Weimar Germany
- Died: 30 November 2008 (aged 84); London, UK
- Education: Balliol College, Oxford
- Scientific career
- Fields: Mathematics; Statistics
- Workplaces: London School of Economics

John Hajnal FBA (/ˈhaɪnɒl/; born Hajnal-Kónyi, [ˈhɒjnɒl ˈkoːɲi]; 26 November 1924 – 30 November 2008) was a Hungarian-British mathematician and statistician.

Hajnal is best known for identifying, in a landmark 1965 paper, the historical pattern of marriage of northwest Europe in which people married late and many adults remained single. The geographical boundary of this unusual marriage pattern is now known as the Hajnal line.

== Biography ==
Hajnal was born on 26 November 1924, in Darmstadt, at the time the capital of the People's State of Hesse in Weimar Germany, to a Hungarian Jewish family. In 1936, his parents left Nazi Germany, and placed him in a Quaker school in the Dutch countryside while they arranged to settle in Britain. In 1937, John was reunited with his parents in London, where he attended University College School, Hampstead.

At age 16, he entered Balliol College, Oxford. He gained a first there in economics, philosophy and politics in 1943. His skills in academic-level mathematics were mostly autodidactical.

After the war, Hajnal worked on demography for the United Nations in New York, and later for the Office of Population Research, Princeton University.

He met Berlin-born Nina Lande in New York. They were married from 1950 until her death in 2008 and had three daughters and a son.

Returning to the United Kingdom, he worked at Manchester University as a statistician from 1953. The family moved to London in 1956, when John was assured a lectureship at the London School of Economics. He was Professor of Statistics at the London School of Economics from 1975 until his retirement in 1986. He died on 30 November 2008, aged 84, in London.

== European marriage patterns ==
Hajnal's reputation rests mainly on a 1965 essay, "European Marriage Patterns in Perspective", in which he described a distinctive marriage regime across much of the continent. Using census returns from around 1900, the earliest date for which broadly comparable figures were available, he showed that in western and northern Europe people tended to marry relatively late and that a sizeable minority of adults never married. In eastern Europe the pattern was reversed, with earlier and near-universal marriage. He set these figures against data from parts of Asia and Africa and argued that the western arrangement had no clear parallel outside Europe.

Much of the essay addressed the harder question of when the western pattern had emerged. Hajnal reviewed evidence from the eighteenth century back to the Middle Ages and antiquity and concluded, tentatively, that medieval marriage in western Europe had not been markedly unusual, and that the change probably began in the sixteenth century, first among elite families and only later further down the social scale. He stressed how fragmentary the surviving evidence was and left many of the questions he raised open.

The geographical divide he identified, running roughly from Saint Petersburg to Trieste, later became known as the Hajnal line. The essay had a lasting influence on historical demography. Reviewing it half a century after publication, the historian E. A. Wrigley treated it as a founding text of the field and noted how consistently later research had returned to Hajnal's contrast between western and eastern Europe.

== Career ==
- Royal Commission on Population, 1944–48
- United Nations, New York, 1948–51
- Office of Population Research, Princeton University, 1951–53
- Manchester University, 1953–57
- London School of Economics, 1957–86. Reader, 1966–75, Professor of Statistics 1975–1986
- Visiting Fellow Commoner, Trinity College, Cambridge, 1974–75
- Visiting Professor, Rockefeller University, 1981

He was a member of the International Statistical Institute and was elected FBA in 1966.
