= Single women in the Middle Ages =

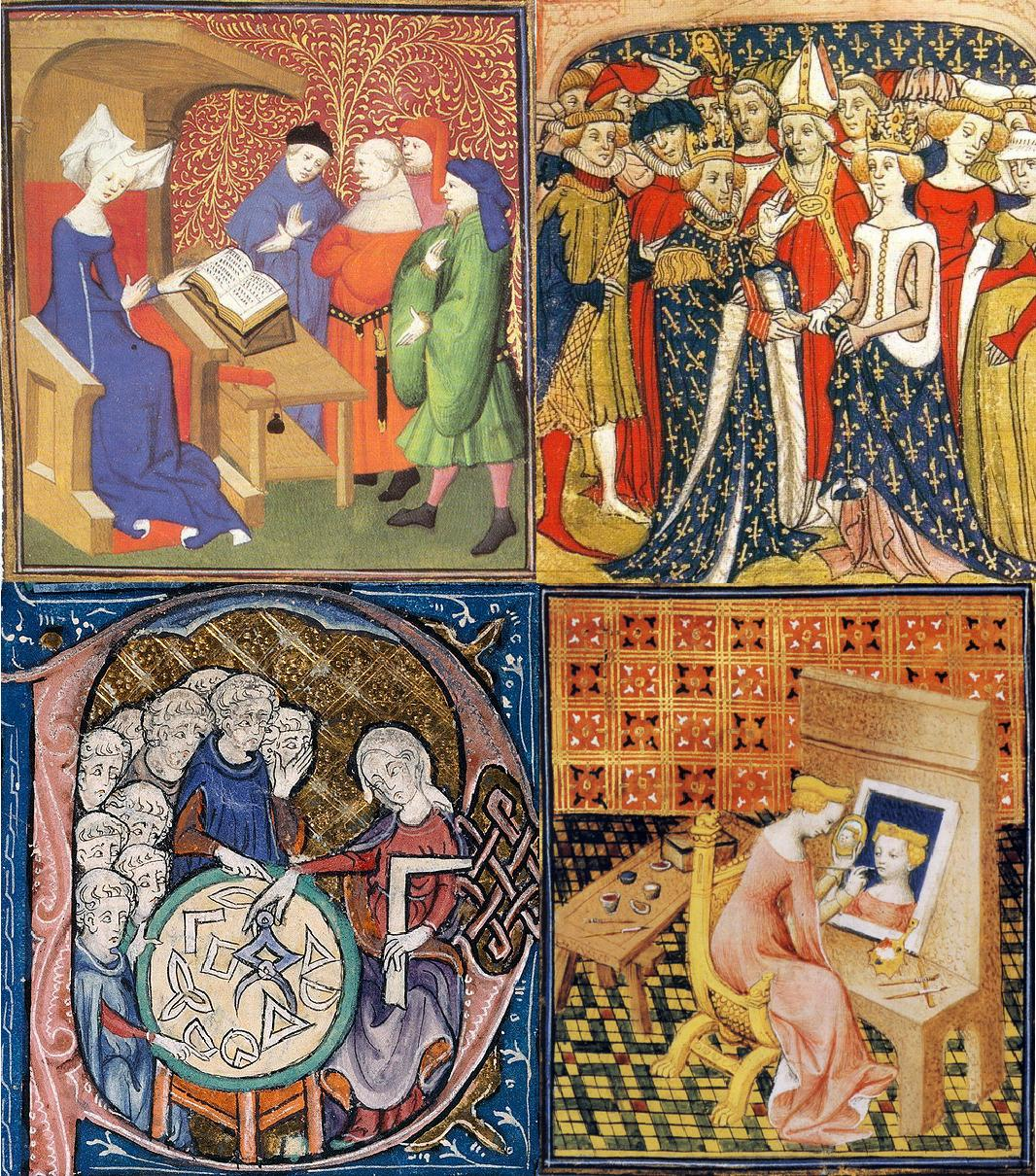
Artistic representation of women in the Middle Ages.

During the Middle Ages in Europe, lifelong spinsters came from a variety of socioeconomic backgrounds, though elite women were less likely to be single than peasants or townswomen. The category of single women does not include widows or divorcees, which are terms used to describe women who were married at one point in their lives.

== Definition ==
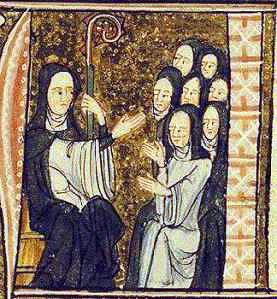
One of the most influential women of her time, St. Hildegard of Bingen was able to make her mark on history without having to marry.

Before 1800, the term "single women" (or "singlewomen", a 14th-century compound) is defined as women who lived without having married, which includes women who would eventually marry in their lifetime and women who never would. The term "life-cycle single women" describes women who were single for the years between childhood and marriage. Women who were single for life fell under the category of lifelong single women.

It is important to distinguish single women from virginal nuns, another group of husbandless women. Although unmarried, not all single women were celibate virgins and virginal nuns practiced very different lives than everyday single women. Widows also differed from single women, as they often had greater economic security and occupational opportunity. While widows and single women both lived without a spouse at some point in their lives, their lifestyles were very different and widows were often awarded more freedoms and opportunities.

== Demographics ==
Demographers have much more information about the demographic history of single women during the early modern and modern period than in the Middle Ages. In fact, there are no sources that offer explicit information on the demographics of single women before the fourteenth century.

"Urban residence, poverty, and migration all raised the age at which women married and prompted higher proportions of single women. Great wealth, high social status, and immobility tended to lower the age of marriage and depress the number of single women."

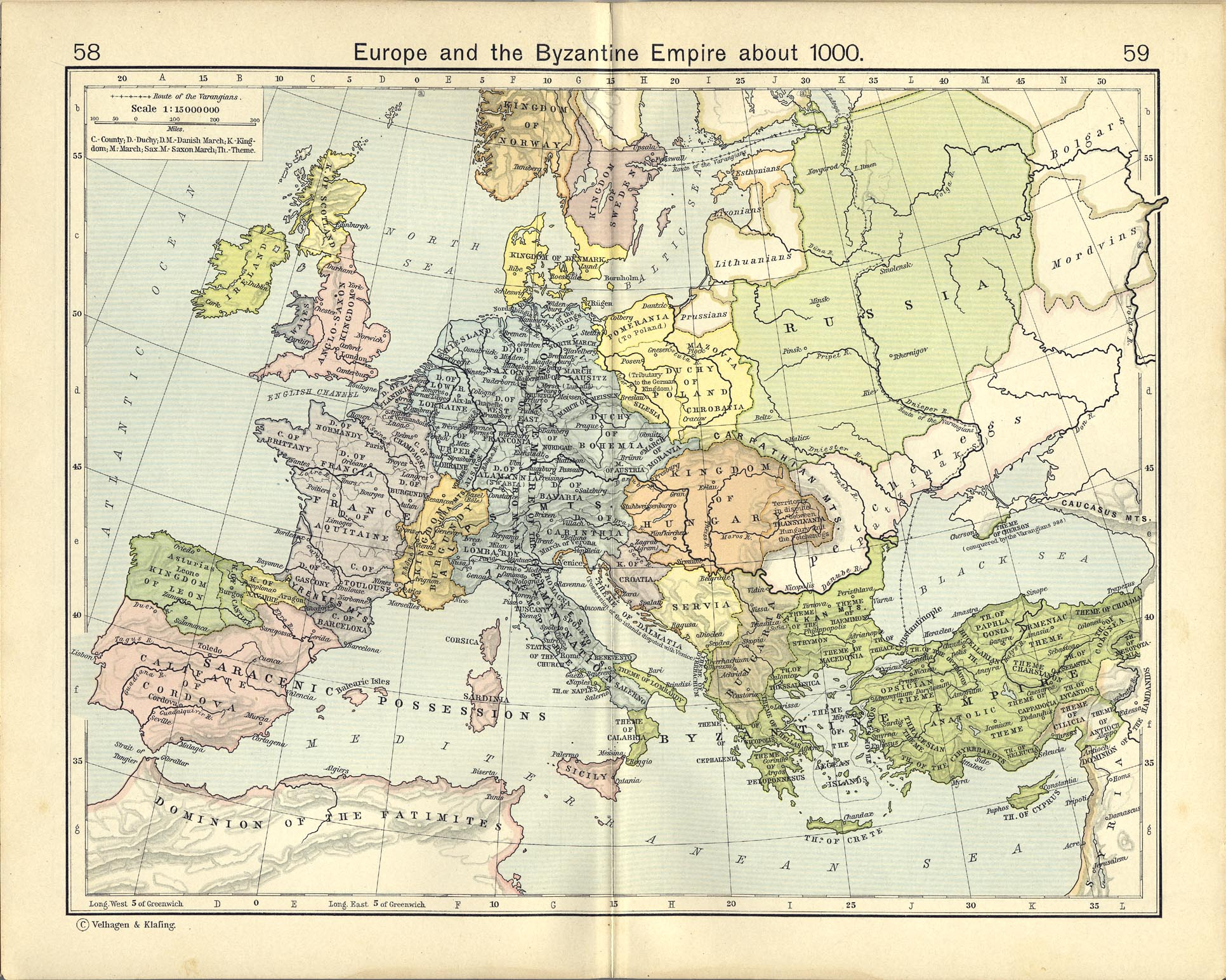
Map of Europe and Byzantine Empire circa 1000 A.D.

=== Late Medieval Europe ===
In medieval Europe, there was a geographic contrast in the proportions of single women. In England in 1377, about one-third of adult women were single; but in the city of Florence in Italy in 1427, only about one-fifth of adult women were single.

In northern Europe, women often married in their mid-twenties. However, "singleness was more common, marriage occurred relatively late, and husbands and wives tended to be of roughly similar ages".

Historians describe this marriage trend in northern Europe as the northwestern European marriage pattern, the trend involving "young, single people work[ing] as laborers or servants for a number of years, saving up money to establish a separate household, and thereby delaying marriage into their early or even mid-twenties".

Women in southern Europe, specifically the Mediterranean regions of southern France, Italy, Spain, and Portugal, usually married in their teens and early twenties. In the Mediterranean regions, a large majority of people married, and wives were often much younger than their husbands.

The early marriage pattern did not appear only in southern Europe, nor was it even most notable there. Among Hungarians, Greeks, Slavs, and Albanians people married earlier than anywhere west of the Hajnal line.

If a woman living in southern Europe did not marry in her teens, she was often expected to join a nunnery.

=== Sex ratios ===
While geographic location influenced the proportions of single women, climatic differences, cultural differences, sex ratios, economic fluctuations, social status, and religion also played a role. In terms of climatic differences, there may have been fewer single women and earlier marriage in southern Europe due to the "high infant and child mortality in southern Europe where summer-related diseases have a noticeable virulent effect".

=== Economics ===
In regards to economic fluctuations, there tended to be more single women in areas where there were more options for paid work. If a woman was suffering financially, she often resorted to early marriage, or remarriage if widowed. "Female prosperity inhibited marriage whereas general prosperity promoted it". Another factor that influenced the proportions of single women was an individual's wealth and social status. Women from poorer classes often married later than women from wealthier classes, as they had to accumulate sufficient dowries. Generally, noblewomen married at the youngest ages.

=== Urban versus rural ===
While there tended to be more single women in northern Europe than in southern Europe, there were also more single women in towns and cities than in the countryside. This phenomenon is likely due to the fact that there were more opportunities for female employment in urban areas. Single women may have been much more prevalent in cities because sex ratios were more equal in rural areas. As there tended to be more women than men in urban areas, lifelong single women were often more abundant in urban areas.

=== Culture and religion ===
Cultural differences also influenced the number of single women in a particular region. For example, in Mediterranean communities, there was an emphasis on the "sexual purity of women as a reflection of family honor" that may have led to early and near-universal marriage.

Religion also played a role in the marriage patterns of women. Jewish women often married in their teens, which was generally earlier than the age at which Christian women got married. Furthermore, lifelong single women were very rare in Jewish communities. In Islamic religions, women often married at a very young age, as they did not need to provide a sufficient dowry.

== Reasons for women being single in the Middle Ages ==
=== Migration ===
Towns and cities were particularly attractive to young women in the Middle Ages who hoped to discover greater financial opportunities or escape customs that gave preference to men. As such, the number of women within the migrant community exceeded that of men and towns began to experience skewed populations in favor of women. Migrant women were usually poorer than town natives and often had to work for many years to earn a dowry. Even still, marriage was not always guaranteed and non-natives tended to experience longer periods of poverty and singlehood than women born in urban areas.

=== Insufficient dowry ===
The dowry practice in the Middle Ages, which involved the exchange of wealth and gifts among families at the time of marriage, was incredibly important to the economic success of the new couple. Medieval families understood that such resources were necessary for the couple, namely the husband, to establish a home and pursue a career, trade or business opportunity. Even the poorest families were expected to provide a dowry on behalf of their daughter and if they could not, their daughter was not usually wed. This class of unwed women often performed years of contract labor to earn an eventual dowry, marrying much later in life, or served as a domestic servant without the option to ever do so.

=== Forced Monasticism ===
Securing advantageous marriages was essential for elite women in the Middle Ages. But for elite women who did not marry, monasticism became the only viable option. Even among elites, large families who had to provide multiple dowries may have also chosen to send a daughter to a convent as a way to lessen the financial burden. Though singlehood was a part of being a nun, their experiences are not representative of the majority of unmarried women living in the Middle Ages.

== Sex, sexuality and spinsterhood ==
=== "Simple fornication" and personal choice ===
Unlike men, single women risked ruining their family's reputation if they wanted to engage in sexual activity outside the contexts of marriage. By the mid-late Middle Ages, the prospect of an independent woman came under increased scrutiny. The prevailing belief was that sex between two unmarried individuals was sinful. While many lifelong single women were sexually active, it is unclear as to what percentage of the population this entailed. Medieval historians were also more likely to classify voluntary sex as prostitution, regardless of whether or not money was exchanged.

"In medieval Europe with its strict classification of women as virgins, wives, and widows, any woman who did not fit into one of three categories risked being equated with member of the only identifiable, demarcated group that did not fit: prostitutes."

Reasons why women would choose spinsterhood over marriage:

- Preferred a temporary or vague union
- Little to no economic incentives
- Familial and socioeconomic pressure

By the latter half of the Middle Ages, the pressure to marry (as described in canon law) grew. As a result, the choice to remain single became increasingly less and less attractive. An independent woman, both symbolically and financially, threatened the established patriarchy. This marked a shift in the perception of single women that followed them into the early modern era.

"Strong and healthy single women under the age of fifty were forbidden to rent houses or rooms, but to go into service; women with a bad reputation were to be evicted by their landlords. Such regulations were a further pointer to women's worsening employment prospects in the early modern period."

=== Same-sex relationships ===
Throughout history, homosexual relationships have occurred between women. While lesbianism was not a definitive characteristic of lifelong spinsters, there were women who fit into this category.

Li livres de jostice et de plet(z) ("The Book of Justice and of Pleas") is an Old French legal treatise compiled in 1260. It is known as one of the first books on record that equates lesbianism with male homosexuality. As such, the Middle Ages marked a change in the way the church viewed and punished female same-sex relationships.

=== Prostitution ===
Single women who couldn't make ends meet would often resort to prostitution if they could not find other means of work. But it is hard to distinguish how prostitution was defined in medieval Europe, namely because it can be found referenced in regard to both commercial and casual sex. However, surviving documents indicate an awareness of the economic circumstances that led women to sell themselves by those in positions of power.

"That canon lawyers and theological writers found no difference between a prostitute and a sexually active woman morally does not mean that they did not recognize that the sex trade was a business. They wrote about under what circumstances it was legitimate for a prostitute to take money. The twelfth-century Parisian scholar Peter the Chanter and his associates Stephen Langton, Robert Courson, and Thomas of Chobham said that a prostitute did not have to make restitution of her ill-gotten gains. Chobham even argues that the prostitute was entitled to a reasonable wage for her sexual services."

While prostitution was considered lewd and sinful by the church, it is possible that the average person didn't stigmatize prostitutes in the same way. Trial records provide the most concrete examples, with prostitutes being called upon to provide crucial testimony in cases of impotence. By the late medieval period, prostitution became regulated in ways it had never been before, relegating working women to particular districts and manners of dress.

"Prostitution waxed and waned in the Middle Ages for reasons never satisfactorily explained. Moral fashions notwithstanding, the major impetus for dramatic increases in prostitution at certain periods in particular countries may have depended upon economic competition with men."

== Economic opportunities ==
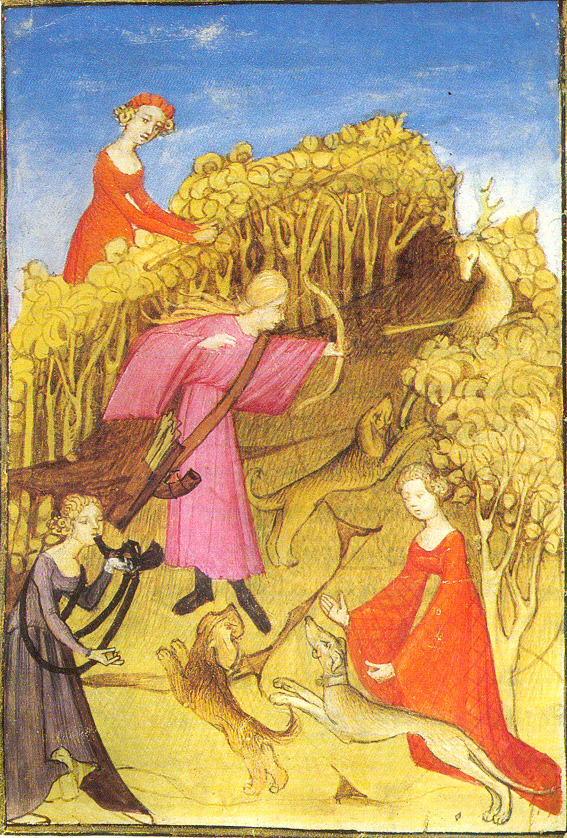

=== Peasant women ===
Peasant women, who lived and worked on manors, comprised the largest group of working women in the Middle Ages. Most peasant women wed at some point, and their manual labors were shared with their husbands. Manorial records indicate that many unmarried women held land on the manor, just as men, and were required to perform the same amount of labor to retain their tenancy. Without the option to divide their labors, single women became one of the hardest working groups within the peasant community.

Though few roles existed exclusively for women, the dairymaid or "daye" became a popular position for women to earn wages on the manor. The rise in popularity, along with the gendered connotation of the daye, can be attributed to the preference for hiring women laborers. Even if the manor did not produce dairy, work could be found for a daye, since women's low wages saved the manor money.

If a woman could not find work as a dairymaid, her labors were permitted during the harvest season. Manorial records indicate that aside from plowing, which earned a higher wage, women participated in all stages of the harvest. Still, a woman was limited by lower wages and could not participate in the harvest of grain, which paid considerably more. Given the widespread discrepancy in earned wages and the limited window of seasonal availability, unmarried peasant women struggled to maintain financial security.

=== Townswomen ===
The migrant influx that drew large numbers of women to towns and cities made it difficult for many women to find a husband among the much smaller population of men. The number of unmarried women in these areas rose quickly as a result, and work became the primary outlet for lower-class women to earn a living. Certain occupations were more available to single women during the early Middle Ages, but restrictions imposed in the later Middle Ages decreased the economic opportunities for single women greatly.

Throughout the Middle Ages, social status was a considerable factor in the type of work a townswoman was eligible to perform. At the lowest end of the spectrum were domestic workers and servants whose physical labors were comparable to that of peasant women in rural areas. Servants were usually migrants from peasant families in the country, and wealthy families could contract their labors for many years. Servant labor was largely domestic, but those who did well could also assist their employer in their place of work. Even though their training was comparable to an apprenticeship, these women were unable to take up the trade professionally.

For a single woman of slightly higher status, her unused dowry might cover the fees necessary to enter an apprenticeship. Single women could sometimes be apprenticed to women who were already practicing their own craft, though this became increasingly rare. Once guilds were established in the later Middle Ages, however, it became nearly impossible for women to enter certain trades. As a result, the trades that did not have professional guilds, like textile manufacturing and the sale of edible goods, became the most accessible options for single women. Even still, apprenticeships within these trades were difficult to acquire and were not given formal representation in official records. If a woman was lucky enough to acquire such an opportunity, it was nearly impossible to advance professionally within the trade. Regardless of their trade or craft, the majority of these women retained low status and remained poor for most of their lives.

The economic difficulties that guilds imposed on unmarried women led many to enter the retail industry. These women were referred to as hucksters, earning a living by buying and selling a variety of edible goods. Without a husband to help them travel, however, hucksters were limited to sales within the town marketplace. Hucksters were regularly accused of reselling goods at prices deceitfully higher than market value. Those accused were referred to as "regraters" and were not highly respected by city officials.

=== Elite women ===
For women of noble status, marriage was an assumed fate. If an elite woman did not marry, or her parents could not support her dowry, a monastic life was her only option. For this reason, elite women who remained unmarried for life were practically unheard of.

== Examples of famous single women ==
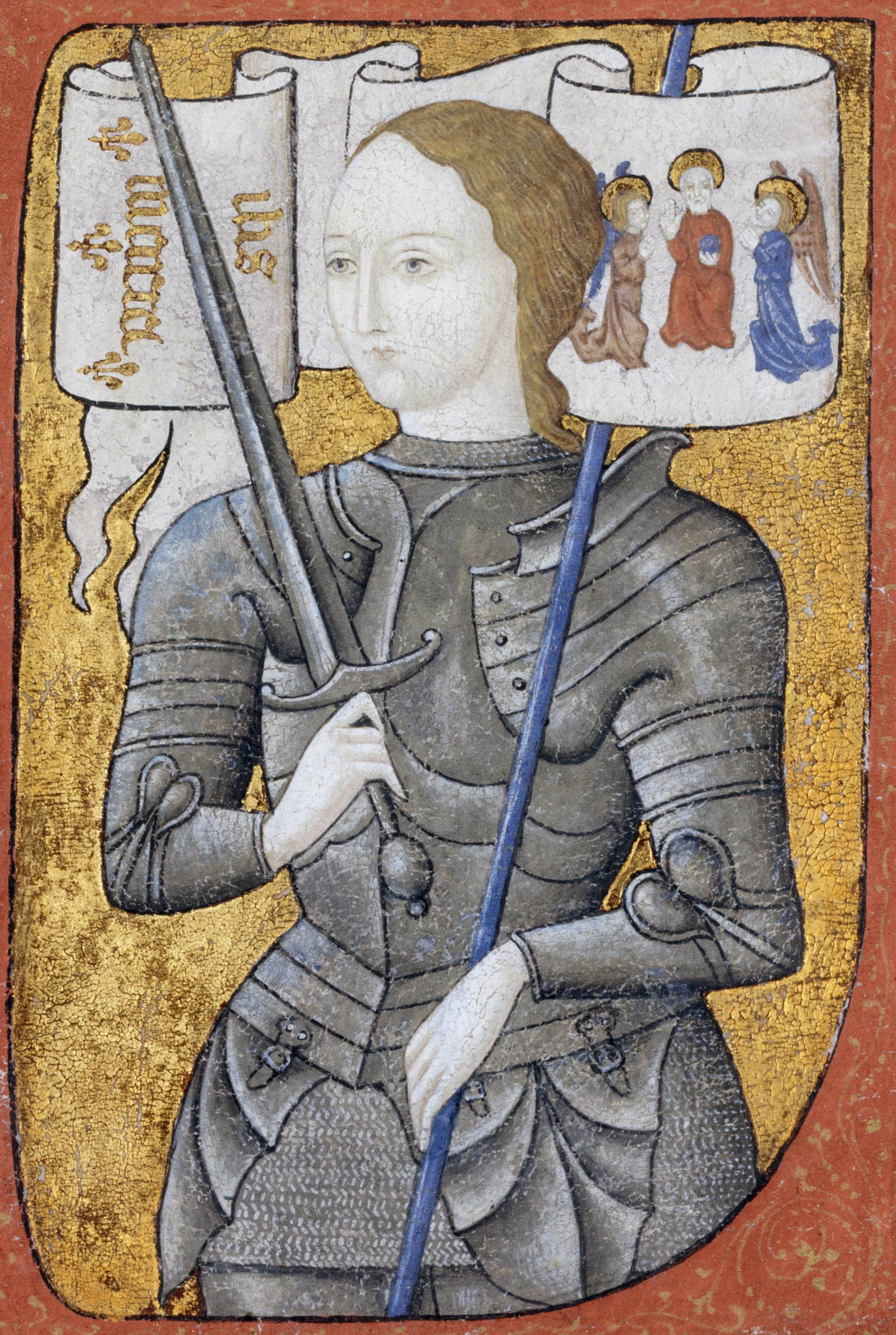
One of the last remaining portraits of Joan of Arc.

- St. Hildegard of Bingen (1098–1179): A German-born abbess, writer, composer, philosopher, Christian mystic, visionary, and polymath.
- Cecilia Penifader of Brigstock (1295–1344): An English peasant woman who made the rare decision to remain a lifelong spinster.
- Joan of Arc (1412–1431): A French peasant girl who claimed to have visions of God. She was tried for blaspheming by wearing men's clothes, of acting upon visions, and of refusing to submit to the church. However, these were politically motivated charges by the English establishment to remove a moral leader amongst their enemies. She was burned at the stake at age 19. Years after her death, Joan of Arc was declared a martyr by the Roman Catholic Church and in 1920 she was officially canonized.

== See also ==
- Women in the Middle Ages
- She never married
- Sworn virgins
