= Western European marriage pattern =

Family and demographic pattern of Western Europe

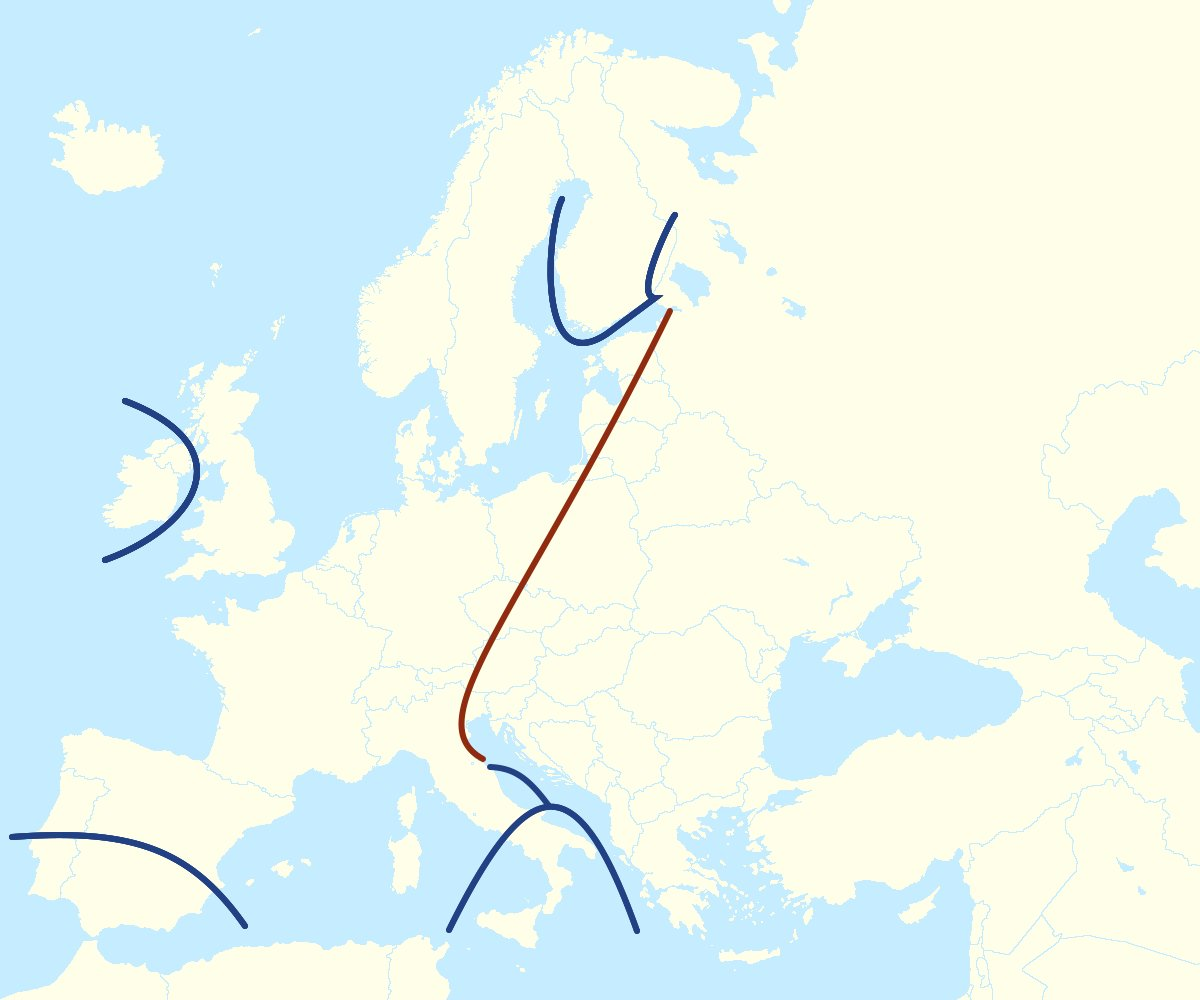
To the west of the Hajnal line, shown in red, the Western European marriage pattern arose. The blue lines mark areas of Western Europe that did not conform to Western Europe's marriage pattern.

The Western European marriage pattern, also sometimes referred to as the Hajnal line, is a family and demographic pattern that is marked by comparatively late marriage (in the middle twenties), especially for women, with a generally small age difference between the spouses, a significant proportion (up to a third) of people who remain unmarried, and the establishment of a neolocal household after the couple has married. In 1965, John Hajnal posited that Europe could be divided into two areas characterised by different patterns of nuptiality. To the west of the line, which extends approximately between Saint Petersburg, Russia, and Trieste, Italy, marriage rates and thus fertility were comparatively low, and a significant minority of women married late or remained single, and most families were nuclear; to the east of the line and in the Mediterranean and particular regions of northwestern Europe, early marriage and extended family homes were the norm, and high fertility was offset by high mortality.

In the 20th century, Hajnal's observations were assumed as valid by a wide variety of sociologists. However, since the early 21st century, his theory has been routinely criticised and rejected by scholars. Hajnal and other researchers did not have access to, or underplayed nuptiality research from behind the Iron Curtain, which contradicts their observations on central and eastern Europeans. Though some sociologists have called to revise or reject the concept of a "Hajnal line", other scientists continue to cite Hajnal's research on the influence of western European marriage patterns.

== Overview ==
The shift toward this "Western European Marriage Pattern" does not have a clear beginning, but it certainly had become established by the end of the fifteenth century on most of the shores of the North Sea. It is a marriage pattern where couples married comparatively late in life (and especially late for the bride compared to other places). On average first marriages took place around the middle twenties for both genders, with men marrying at slightly older ages than women, and only setting up a nuclear household when they were financially stable enough to care for a household, all of this preceded by time working as servants, farmhands or apprentices. Also, a significant proportion of women married after their twenties and 20–30% of women never married. During the Middle Ages and the modern times, all kinds of movements developed which gradually sought to diminish the influence of the Church in matrimonial matters. The impetus was given in the Netherlands since the Middle Ages with urban ordinances threatening civil and criminal measures against those guilty of kidnapping, i.e. marriage without parental consent. This evolution continued and in 1540 Emperor Charles V decreed that any man who married under 25 years of age and any woman who married under 20 years of age without paternal consent forfeited all the benefits normally accruing to the surviving spouse. Female age at marriage has proven to be a strong indicator for female autonomy and is used frequently by economic history research.

=== Effects ===
The pattern of late and non-universal marriage restricted fertility massively, especially when it was coupled with very low levels of childbirth out of wedlock. Birth control took place by delaying marriage more than suppressing fertility within it. A woman's life-phase from menarche (which was generally reached on average at 14 years, with some women reaching it earlier) to the birth of her first child was unusually long, averaging ten years.

== Compared to other cultures ==
To the west of the Hajnal line, about half of all women aged 15 to 50 years of age were married at any given time while the other half were widows or spinsters; to the east of the line, about seventy percent of women in that age bracket were married at any given time while the other thirty percent were widows or nuns. The marriage records of Western and Eastern Europe in the early 20th century illustrate this pattern vividly; west of the Hajnal line, only 25% of women aged 20–24 were married while to the east of the line, over 75% of women in this age group were married and less than five percent of women remained unmarried.

This marriage pattern varied across time and space and class; noblewomen certainly married early, but they were a small minority. The comparatively late age at marriage for women and the small age gap between spouses is rather unusual; women married as adults rather than as dependents, often worked before marriage and brought some skills into the marriage, were less likely to be exhausted by constant pregnancy, and were about the same age as their husbands

Outside of Europe, women could be married even earlier and even fewer would remain celibate; in Korea, practically every woman 50 years of age had been married and spinsters were extremely rare, compared to 20–30% of women in western Europe age 50 who had never married.

== Contributing factors in the Netherlands ==
The highest average age at first marriage was in the Netherlands: on average 27 years for women and 30 years for men in both the rural and urban population from the late 1400s onward until the end of WWII, rising at times to 30 years for women and 32 years for men. On average 25–30% of people in the Netherlands remained unmarried throughout their life between 1500 and 1950. In Amsterdam the mean age at first marriage for women fluctuated between 23.5 and 25 years old from the late 15th century until the 1660s, when it started to rise even further.

From early on the Roman Catholic Church promoted sexual abstinence over marriage, but marriage over sexual promiscuity. This meant that remaining unmarried became socially acceptable in Western Europe. In the Middle Ages marriage was often not recorded and therefore could depend on the word of the couple that could either confirm or deny it having taken place. A majority of unmarried women would be in the service of the church as nuns or as lay women. A vast number of women also provided for themselves in specialised professions until the financial freedoms of women were curtailed by the guilds in the late Middle Ages. This meant that until the late Middle Ages many women could also run businesses to sustain themselves outside of marriage.

After the 1400s the first marriage age became better recorded and seems to be influenced largely by the economic situation. In times of economical uncertainty both women and men tended to marry younger (between 20-25 years old for women) but the age gap was somewhat larger. A major factor was that by marrying their daughter off young the parents had one mouth less to feed and the dowry was often lower for younger girls who had learned less skills and build up less savings. This also explains the larger age gap between husband and wife in economical harsher times: an older husband would already have established himself an income to sustain a wife and thus children. Though for political reasons nobility often engaged and married far younger than the general population in many cases the actual consummation of the marriage was postponed until both marriage partners had reached a more mature age.

Another contributing factor to later marriage age is that in the Middle Ages a culture of nuclear family structures developed from the multiple generational extended family structures that were common in pre-Christian tribal societies in Western Europe. Both men and women would typically spend several years of working as a maid, farmhand, labourer or apprentice in order to gain work experience, develop skills and save up money to sustain their own nuclear family, rather than continuing to live in multigenerational household. This development raised the socially accepted first marriage age of women from puberty onset (12–14 years old) in the early Middle Ages up to their late teens and older by the late medieval period, and during the renaissance up to their middle twenties on average. This development also brought the first marriage age of women and men far closer together. The great general wealth in the Netherlands from the spice trade also meant that women married later in life. The highest marriage ages for both men and women was past 30 years old and are found in times of national financial prosperity.

Another contributing reason was that late marriage age was a recognised method of birth control. The later a woman married the less children she would birth and the less children a couple had to raise. It was also generally recognised that giving birth at a very young age was detrimental for the woman's health and therefore socially disapproved of. Social disapproval of a young marriage age for the woman and a large age gap between the marriage partners can still be recognised in sayings originating in those centuries. A well known example from neighbouring Britain is the cautionary tale of the play Romeo and Juliet by William Shakespeare of whom the young ages were considered scandalous at the time.

== Variation and development in Britain & Ireland ==
Where in the mid-1500s in England, approximately 8 percent of women remained unmarried the inference would be that that figure was either the same or lower in the previous several centuries; marriage in Medieval England appears to be a robust institution where over 90% of women married and roughly 70% of women aged 15 to 50 years were married at any given time while the other 30% were single or widows. In Yorkshire in the 14th and 15th centuries, the age range for most brides was between 18 and 22 years and the age of the grooms was similar; rural Yorkshire women tended to marry in their late teens to early twenties while their urban counterparts married in their early to middle twenties. In the 15th century, the average Italian bride was 18 and married a groom 10–12 years her senior. An unmarried Tuscan woman 21 years of age would be seen as past marriageable age, the benchmark for which was 19 years, and easily 97 percent of Florentine women were married by the age of 25 years while 21 years was the average age of a contemporary English bride.

While the average age at first marriage had climbed to 25 years for women and 27 years for men in England the percentage of unmarried Englishwomen rose from less than 10% to nearly 20% by the mid-17th century and their average age at first marriage rose to 26 years at the same time. There was nonetheless great variation within Britain alone; while Lowland Scotland saw patterns similar to England, with women married in the middle twenties after a period of domestic service, the high birth rate of Highland Scotland and the Hebrides imply a lower age of marriage for the bride, possibly similar to Gaelic Ireland, where Brehon Law stated that women became legally marriageable at 15 years and men at 18 years. Similarly, between 1620 and 1690 the average age of first marriage for Swedish women was roughly 20 years, approximately 70% of Swedish women aged between 15 and 50 years were married at any one time, and the proportion of single women was less than 10%. But by the end of the 18th century this had risen to roughly 27 years in Sweden and remained high with the celibacy rate as a result of falling infant mortality rates, declining famines, decreasing available land and resources for a growing population, and other factors.

Similarly, Ireland's average age of marriage in 1830 was 23.8 for women and 27.47 for men where they had once been about 21 and 25, respectively, and only about 10% of adults remained unmarried. in 1840, they had respectively risen to 24.4 and 27.7; In the decades after the Great Famine, the age of marriage had risen to 28–29 for women and 33 for men and as much as a third of Irishmen and a fourth of Irishwomen never married due to chronic economic problems that discouraged early marriage.

== Economy in Britain ==
Class differences played a great role in when a couple could marry; the wealthier that a couple was, the likelier that they were to marry earlier. Noblewomen and gentlewomen married early, but they were a small minority; a thousand marriage certificates issued by the Diocese of Canterbury between 1619 and 1660 show that only one bride was aged thirteen years, four were fifteen, twelve were sixteen, seventeen were seventeen, and the other 966 of the brides were aged nineteen years or older when they married for the first time. The church stipulated that both the bride and groom must be at least 21 years of age to marry without the consent of their families; the most common ages of marriage were 22 for women, 24 for men; the median ages were 22.8 for women and 25.5 for men; the average ages were 24 years for women and nearly 28 years for men. The youngest brides were nobility and gentry.

The moderate rates of fertility, mortality, and marriage within the region were tied to the economy; when times were better, more people could afford to marry early and thus have more children and conversely more people delayed marriages (or remained unmarried) and bore fewer children when times were bad. This contrasts with societies outside of this region, where early marriage for both sexes was virtually universal and high fertility was counteracted by high mortality; in the 15th century, a Tuscan woman 21 years of age would be seen as past marriageable age, the deadline for which was 19 years, and easily 97 percent of Florentine women were married by the age of 25 years while 21 years was the typical age of an English bride.

== Significance ==
The region's late marriage pattern has received considerable scholarly attention in part because it appears to be unique; it has not been found in any other part of the world prior to the 20th century. However, similar marriage patterns, with a high degree of female agency (as measured by the so-called 'female-friendliness index') have been documented in Mongolia, Japan, and parts of Southeast Asia. The origins of the late marriage system are a matter of conjecture prior to the 15th century when the demographic evidence from family reconstitution studies makes the prevalence of the pattern clear; while evidence is scant, most English couples seemed to marry for the first time in their early twenties before the Black Death and afterward, when economic conditions were better, often married in their late teens. While in neighbouring Netherlands the female marriage age went up in times of financial prosperity to between 25 and 30 years, and fell in times of economic hardship to below 25 while also the age gap between brides and grooms increased. Many historians have wondered whether this unique conjugal regime might explain, in part, why capitalism first took root in Northwestern Europe, contributing to the region's relatively low mortality rates, hastening the fragmentation of the peasantry and the precocious formation of a mobile class of landless wage-earners. Others have highlighted the significance of the late marriage pattern for gender relations, for the relative strength of women's position within marriage, the "conjugal" dowry system of Northwestern Europe in which the dowry merged with the husband's wealth and would thus grow or shrink depending on circumstances (perhaps an incentive for many women to work), the centrality of widows in village land inheritance, and the vitality of women's community networks. The Roman Catholic Church curtailed arranged marriages in the middle ages in which the bride did not clearly agree to the union.

== Background ==
=== Antiquity ===
The beginnings of this marriage pattern might be found as early as the time of the Roman Empire. Julius Caesar, writing in the first century B.C, wrote that while the Germanic tribes to the north of the empire were communal with their land, living under the Sippe kinship system, the homesteads were largely separate from each other, unlike the closer proximity in Roman towns. And Tacitus, writing a century and a half later, also observed these many private households among the Germanic tribes, although there was public ownership of pastures and controlled use of the forests.

Anglo-Saxon kinship terms were generally very basic; the same word is used for the titles of nephew and grandson, likewise for the term for granddaughter and niece. Based on this, the nuclear household seems to be the norm. Also, since the Church forbade marrying within a given degree of kinship, the common people were probably further discouraged from keeping elaborate kinship networks; Britain only had so many people and virtually everybody on the island was related to some degree and possibly the distant relations had to be forgotten or nearly all marriages would be within the prohibited degrees.

In any case, while nuclear residences might have been the norm for families, the extended family was undeniably important for the Anglo-Saxons; As with many other Germanic tribes, if a member of a family was wronged or injured in any way, the Kentish Laws outlines the restrictions of feuds and reparations to the victim of the offense; kindreds were to take charge of reparation and they could (with a few exceptions, for example, when the conflict was too close in blood-line) arrange either for vengeance or for the payment of compensation to the kin of the killed. In addition, Anglo-Saxon women, like those of other Germanic tribes, are marked as women from the age of twelve onward, based on archaeological finds, implying that the age of marriage coincided with puberty.

=== Middle Ages ===
==== Christianity and manorialism ====
The rise of Christianity created more incentives to keep families nuclear; the Church instituted marriage laws and practices that undermined large kinship groups. From as early as the fourth century, the Church discouraged any practice that enlarged the family, like adoption, polygamy, taking concubines, divorce, and remarriage. The Church severely discouraged and prohibited consanguineous marriages, a marriage pattern that has constituted a means to maintain kinship groups (and thus their power) throughout history; Canon law followed civil law until the early ninth century, when the Western Church increased the number of prohibited degrees from four to seven. The church also clipped the ability of parents to retain kinship ties through arranged marriages by forbidding unions in which the bride did not clearly agree to the union. These rules were not necessarily followed unanimously nor did all cultures across Europe evolve toward nuclear families, but by the latter half of the Middle Ages the nuclear household was dominant over most of Northwestern Europe and where in the old indigenous religions, women married between 12 and 15 years of age (coinciding with puberty) and men married in their middle twenties, as Christianity expanded men married increasingly earlier and women married increasingly later.

The rise of manorialism in the vacuum left after the Fall of Rome might also have weakened the ties of kinship at the same time that the Church had curtailed the power of clans; as early as the 800s in northern France, families that worked on manors were small, consisting of parents and children and occasionally a grandparent. The Church and State had become allies in erasing the solidarity and thus the political power of the clans; the Church sought to replace traditional religion, whose vehicle was the kin group, and substituting the authority of the elders of the kin group with that of a religious elder, the presbyter. At the same time, the king's rule was undermined by revolts on the part of powerful, communal kin groups, whose conspiracies and murders threatened the power of the state and, once manorialism had become established, also threatened the demand of manorial lords for obedient, compliant workers; in the west, manorialism was unsuccessful in establishing itself in Frisia, Ireland, Scotland, Wales, Cornwall, the East of England, and the south of Iberia and Italy.

Indeed, Medieval England saw marriage age as variable depending on economic circumstances, with couples delaying marriage until the early twenties when times were bad and the average age falling to the late teens after the Black Death, when there were labor shortages; by appearances, marriage of adolescents was not the norm in England. The sudden loss of people from the plague resulted in a glut of lucrative jobs for many people and more people could afford to marry young, lowering the age at marriage to the late teens and thus increasing fertility.

==== The beginnings of consensual marriage ====
About 1140, Gratian established that according to canon law the bonds of marriage should be determined by mutual consent and not consummation, voicing opinions similar to Isaac's opinion of forced marriages; marriages were made by God and the blessing of a priest should only be made after the fact. Therefore, a man and a woman could agree to marry each other at even the minimum age of consent- fourteen years for men, twelve years for women- and bring the priest after the fact. But this doctrine led to the problem of clandestine marriage, performed without witness or connection to public institution. The opinion of the parents was still important, although the final decision was not the decision to be made by the parents, for this new consent by both parties meant that a contract between equals was drawn rather than a coerced consensus.

Patriarchy remained in some form or another, including the necessity of the dowry by young women. To curb secret marriages and remind young couples of parental power, the Medieval Church encouraged prolonged courtship, arrangements and monetary logistics, informing the community of the wedding, and finally the formal exchange of vows. While in the South a woman's dowry was viewed as separate from her husband's wealth, in the Northwest the dowry was "conjugal"; a woman's dowry merged with her husband's wealth and would grow or shrink depending on circumstances and to which she had rights in widowhood, an attractive incentive for women to earn money. And the chance for women to earn money in the one hundred and fifty years after the Black Death was attractive, with less competition for jobs; as much as half of women in the North willingly worked to earn money for marriage while their Southern contemporaries were married or widows before turning to work and unmarried young women only worked as a last resort, lest her honor be put at risk.

=== Early modern Britain ===
The average age at first marriage had gradually risen again by late sixteenth century; the population had stabilized and availability of jobs and land had lessened. In the last decades of the century the age at marriage had climbed to averages of 25 for women and 27 for men in England and to 27 for women and 30 for men in the Netherlands. Generally first marriage age for women went down in time of economic decline due to lack of money or resources of the parents and a decline in living standards, and went up in times of economic growth and social stability. The first marriage age for women remained high for nearly five centuries and averages across Northwestern Europe had done likewise. From the late Middle Ages on, because of its sacramental nature, marriage was increasingly held to be indissoluble, and sexual relations outside of marriage were increasingly viewed as illicit. Christian Europe banned polygamy and divorce, and attempted to prohibit any form of sexual relationship that was not marriage, such as concubine or premarital sex, termed fornication. Women were generally expected to bring a dowry when they married, which ranged from a few household goods to a whole province in the case of the high nobility. Remarriage after the death of a spouse was acceptable for both men and women, and very common, though men remarried faster than women. Most issues regarding marriage and many other aspects of family life came under the jurisdiction of church courts and were regulated by an increasingly elaborate legal system termed canon law. The ideals for marriage were not followed in many instances: powerful individuals could often persuade church courts to grant annulments of marriages they needed to end; men, including priests and other church leaders, had concubines and mistresses; young people had sex before marriage and were forced into marriages that they did not want. Nevertheless, these ideals and the institutions established to enforce them remained important shapers of men's and women's understanding of and place within a family.

When a growing population of poverty caused by "over-hasting marriages and over-soon setting up of households by the youth", the decree of the Common Council of London in 1556 raised the age of consent to twenty-one. This aligned with the contemporary views that condemned those who had no means to establish and maintain their own household. The Poor Relief Act 1601 (43 Eliz. 1. c. 2) also contributed to an increase in the average age of first marriage. It allowed overseers to apprentice children of the parish poor from the age of ten to twenty-four, essentially delaying the prospects of marriage.

So many Englishmen began migrating en masse to North America that the marriage prospects for unmarried Englishwomen dwindled and the average age of first marriage rose for Englishwomen. In addition, there was a sharp rise in the percentage of women who remained unmarried and thus decreased fertility; an Englishwoman marrying at the average age of 26 years in the late 17th century who survived her childbearing years would bear an average of 5.03 children while an Englishwoman making a comparable marriage in the early 19th century at the average age of 23.5 years and surviving her childbearing years would bear on average 6.02 children, an increase of about 20 percent.

From 1619 to 1660 in the archdiocese of Canterbury, England, the median age of the brides was 22 years and nine months while the median age for the grooms was 25 years and six months, with average ages of 24 years for the brides and nearly 28 years for the grooms, with the most common ages at marriage being 22 years for women and 24 years for men; the Church dictated that the age when one could marry without the consent of one's parents was 21 years. A large majority of English brides in this time were at least 19 years of age when they married, and only one bride in a thousand was thirteen years of age or younger.

William Shakespeare's drama Romeo and Juliet puts Juliet's age at just short of fourteen years; the idea of a woman marrying in secret at a very early age would have scandalised Elizabethans. The common belief in Elizabethan England was that motherhood before 16 was dangerous; popular manuals of health, as well as observations of married life, led Elizabethans to believe that early marriage and its consummation permanently damaged a young woman's health, impaired a young man's physical and mental development, and produced sickly or stunted children. Therefore, 18 came to be considered the earliest reasonable age for motherhood and 20 and 30 the ideal ages for women and men, respectively, to marry. Shakespeare might also have reduced Juliet's age from sixteen to fourteen to demonstrate the dangers of marriage at too young of an age; that Shakespeare himself married Anne Hathaway when he was just eighteen (very unusual for an Englishman of the time) might hold some significance.

== Precursor to theory ==
The earliest conception of the theory was created by Werner Conze, a Nazi anthropologist. He refined the racist ideas of his mentor, Gunther Ipsen, as well others, who sought to link racial attributes like skin color and ethnicity to marriage patterns. His deeply flawed analysis of Baltic nuptiality data left an impression on decision makers in the German military, convincing them of the latent racial inferiority and alienness of Slavic people. Since the 1990s, Werner Conze's influence has been linked by German scholars to the mass murder of millions of Slavic civilians during the German occupation of central and eastern European countries.

== See also ==
- Demographic transition
- Marriage
- Medieval singlewomen
- Nuclear family
- Extended family
- Kinship
