= Northern, Central and Southern Vietnam =

Regions of Vietnam

Northern Vietnam, Central Vietnam and Southern Vietnam are the three main geographical and cultural regions within Vietnam. Each region consists of subregions, with considerable cultural differences originating from each subregions. The regional names below have been used by the Vietnamese governments since 1975 (see also: Subdivisions of Vietnam):

Regions of Vietnam. The Paracel Islands and the Spratly Islands (not shown here) are parts of South Central Coast.

Northern Vietnam (Bắc Bộ) includes:

- Northeast (Đông Bắc Bộ)
- Northwest (Tây Bắc Bộ)
- Red River Delta (Châu thổ sông Hồng or Đồng bằng sông Hồng)

Central Vietnam (Trung Bộ) includes:

- North Central Coast (Bắc Trung Bộ)
- South Central Coast (Duyên hải Nam Trung Bộ)
- Central Highlands (Tây Nguyên – "Western Highlands")

Southern Vietnam (Nam Bộ) includes:

- Southeast (Đông Nam Bộ)
- Mekong River Delta (Đồng bằng sông Cửu Long or Tây Nam Bộ – Southwest)

== Historical context ==
Map of Vietnam showing its territorial expansions, 11th to 19th century

Đại Việt, Champa and Khmer Empire (12th century)

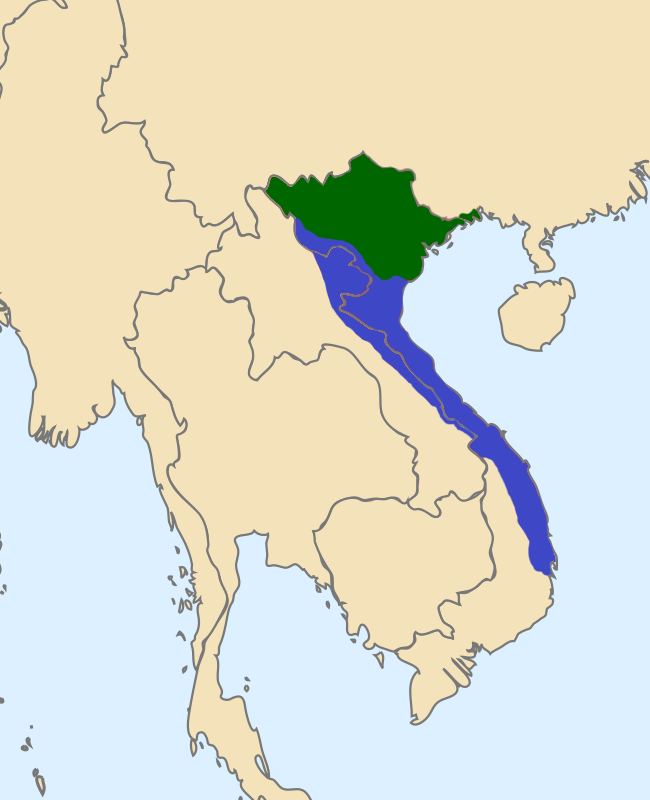
Northern and Southern dynasties (Vietnam)(1533–1592)

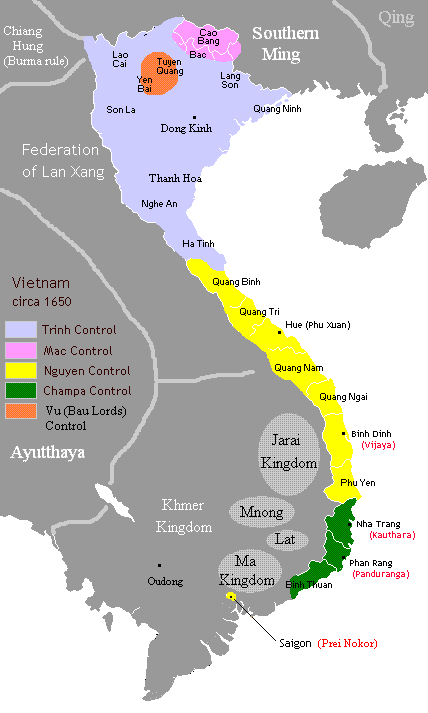
Vietnam in 17th century during the Trịnh–Nguyễn War

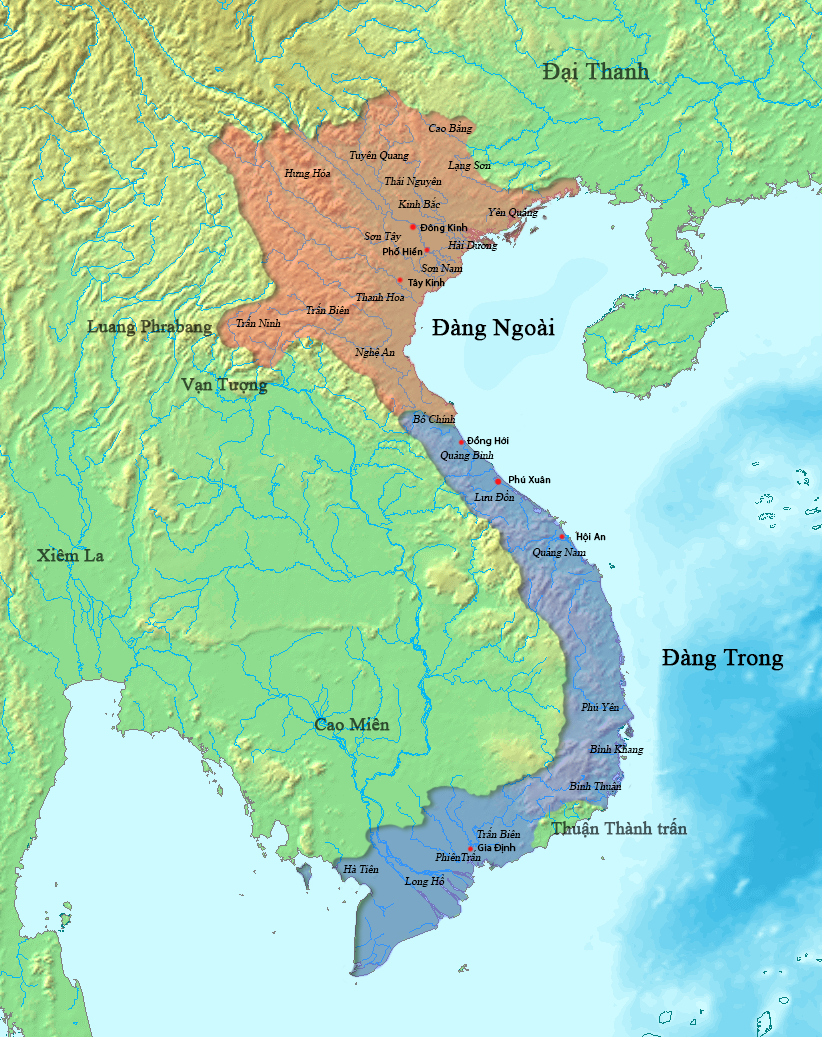
Map of Vietnam under the control of Trịnh lords and Nguyễn lords (1627-1775)

Administrative map of the Nguyen dynasty in 1838 with its five realms: Northern (Bắc Kỳ), Left (Tả Kỳ), Direct (Trực Kỳ), Right (Hữu Kỳ) and Southern (Nam Kỳ)

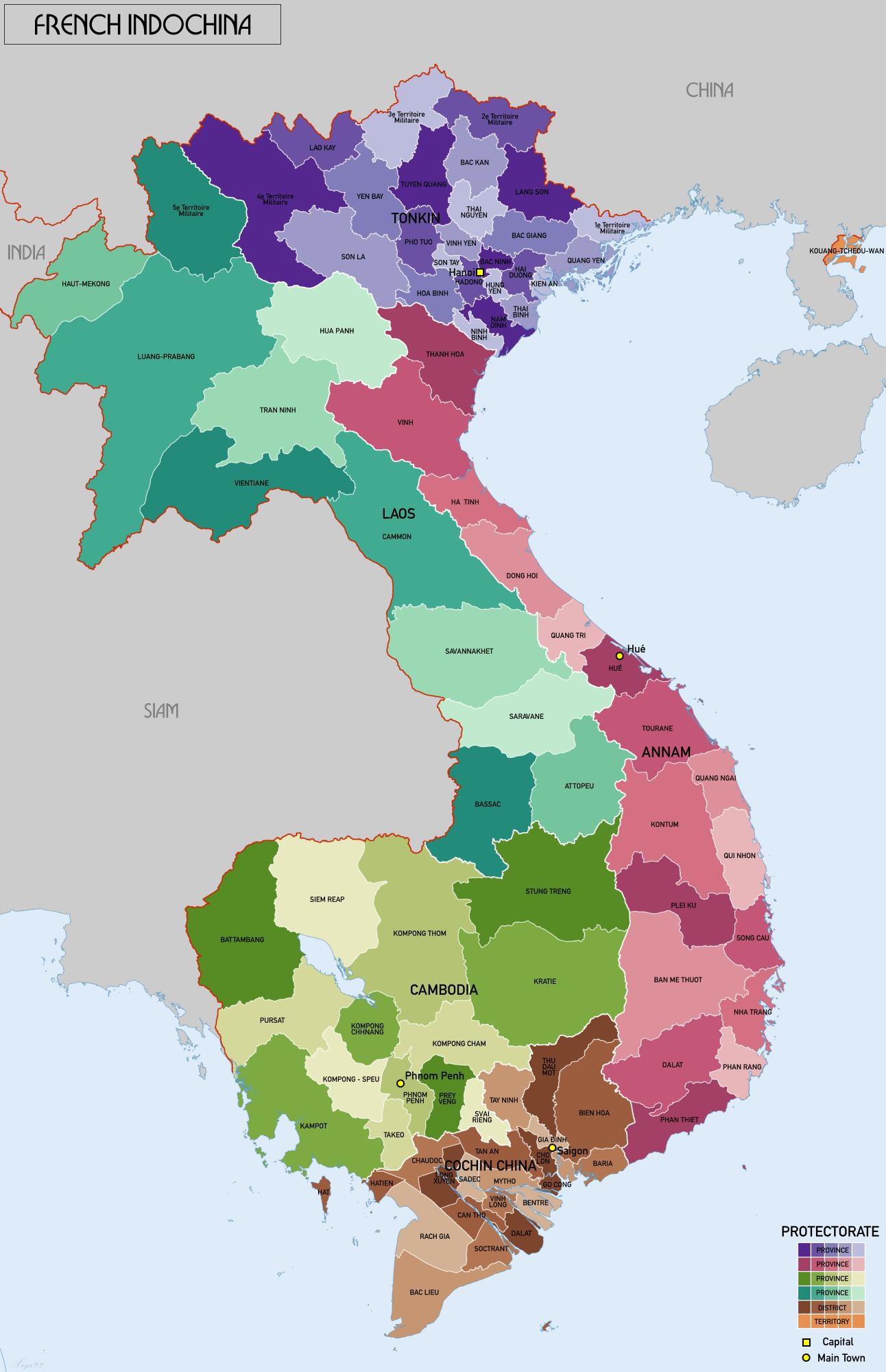
Map of division of French Indochina (1887-1954)

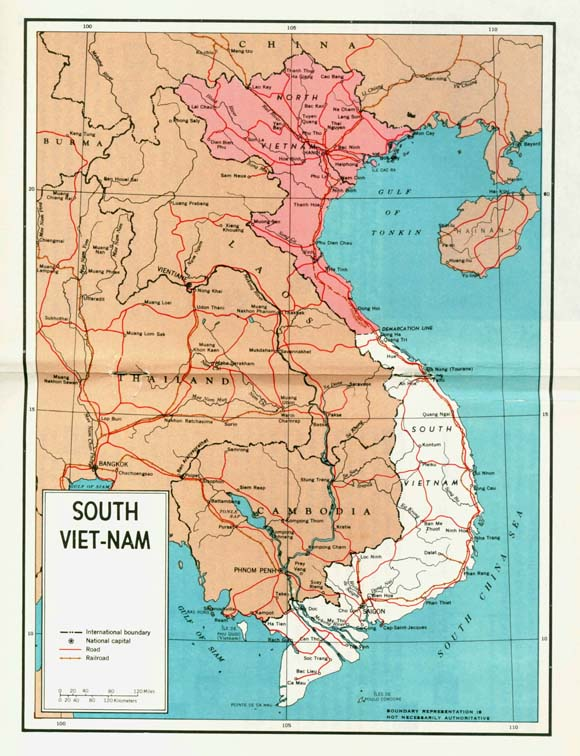
North and South Vietnam (1954–1975)

The Northern Vietnam is the traditional homeland of the ethnic Vietnamese (Kinh people) where the Đông Sơn culture existed with the first states appearing here, the region later was ruled by Nanyue and later the various Chinese dynasties until the independence in 939 and influenced by Han Chinese culture, language, and migration. After the division of Vietnam from 944, the country was unified and the Đinh Dynasty was established as the first Vietnamese one with the title of emperor in 968. Through migration and conquests, Vietnamese people gradually spread south in a process called Nam Tiến (Advancing South).

Central Vietnam was home to Cham people, a Malayo-Polynesian ethnic group who founded their distinct Indianised Kingdom over the Central Coast before being subdued by the Vietnamese during the 14th century. Their predecessors, people who are now known as the Sa Huỳnh culture, dated back from 1000 BCE.

The Southern Vietnam was part of Funan, Chenla then Angkor Empire. Chinese (Han) and Vietnamese started migrating en masse to this region during the 16th to 17th century, the region was gradually annexed by Vietnamese, including the Mekong Delta of Cambodia.

Northern and Southern Vietnam was a fluid concept that changed constantly during the course of history. During the Lý and Trần dynasties, the Đại Việt kingdom was marked into two regions termed Kinh and Trại. From Thanh Hóa southward was Trại, and from Ninh Bình northward was Kinh.

During the Northern and Southern dynasties (1533–1592), Vietnam was partitioned with the Mạc dynasty holding the Red River Delta and Lê dynasty controlling the Central Region from Thanh Hóa to Bình Định while Champa and the Khmers still held their polities further south.

During the Trịnh–Nguyễn War and from 1627 to 1777, two ruling Lords existed in the country with the border (mostly) being the Gianh River in Quảng Bình Province. The North, called Đàng Ngoài (Outer Realm) was ruled by the Trịnh lords and Nguyễn lords in the South, called Đàng Trong (Inner Realm) or Quảng Nam Quốc, with Lê emperors still nominally acting as head of state. The two sides ruled their own domain independent of the other, and frequently fought each other. The imposed separation encouraged the two regions to develop their own cultures. During the 16th to 17th centuries, the southward expansion or Nam Tiến have completed with the Lower Cochinchina peninsula being populated by Vietnamese settlers. The new region now became known as Gia Định.

After the Tây Sơn Wars (1771–1802) and the founding of the Nguyễn dynasty (successors of the Nguyễn lords), the country was unified in 1802 with the center of power now located in Huế in Central Vietnam and with three main regions: Đàng Ngoài, Đàng Trong and Gia Định.

In 1802, Emperor Gia Long created a protectorate government in Tonkin, naming the Viceroyalty of the Northern Citadel (Tổng trấn Bắc Thành, 總鎮北城) from 11 provinces of the former Đàng Ngoài. The region is ruled by a Tổng trấn (總鎮) or the Overlord of Citadel, or Viceroy. In 1808, he created the Viceroyalty of the Gia Định Citadel (Tổng trấn Gia Định Thành, 總鎮嘉定城) from five southern provinces. The country now consists of Bắc Thành and Gia Định regions, 7 central provinces and 4 departments (including the capital) are under direct rule of the Emperor.

In 1833, Emperor Minh Mạng restructured the administrations. Bắc Thành was renamed Bắc Kỳ (North region 北圻) and Phiên An (Gia Định) was renamed Nam Kỳ (South region 南圻). Hữu Kỳ (Right region 右圻) was created from provinces from Thanh Hóa to Hà Tĩnh. Tả Kỳ (Left region 左圻) was created from the provinces from Bình Định to Bình Thuận. The central provinces from Quảng Bình to Quảng Ngãi, including the capital prefecture Thừa Thiên formed Trực Kỳ or Directly-ruled region (直圻). The protectorate of Tây Thành (Western Citadel 西城) was also formed from the Nguyễn-ruled areas in Cambodia. In 1887, Tả Kỳ, Hữu Kỳ and Trực Kỳ were merged and formed Trung Kỳ (Central region 中圻).

During French colonial era, the French first invaded and directly ruled over Cochinchina as a colony from 1862. In 1884, the French established the Annam protectorate in Trung Kỳ and Tonkin protectorate in Bắc Kỳ. In 1897, Tonkin became de-facto under direct French rule. Consequently, Cochinchina was longer influenced by French culture than the other two regions. In Tonkin, only urban centers such as Hanoi, Haiphong and Nam Dinh have significant French influence.

From 1954 to 1975, Vietnam was again divided into two separate countries, it divided by the Bến Hải River in Quảng Trị Province at the 17th parallel, with the North led by a communist government, and the South by one that was capitalist. Although the nation has been united, linguistic, cultural, and other differences serve to delineate the two regions from one another, with accompanying stereotypes.

Hanoi is the nation's capital and the second largest city of Vietnam. Ho Chi Minh City (usually called Saigon) is the country's economic capital and largest city in Vietnam.

== Cultural differences ==
The cultural differences between the regions can be divided into two main categories: "tangible" cultural differences such as traditional clothing, cuisine, and so on; and "intangible" cultural differences dealing with stereotypes of behavior, attitude and such between the people of these two regions.

=== Perceived traits and stereotypes ===
While relations between the two groups are generally civil, the increased contact due to the influx of northerners into the South since the start of the Vietnam War has given rise to very many stereotypes about people from different regions:

- Northerners, especially Hanoians, tend to view themselves as more cultured and refined.
- Southerners consider themselves more dynamic, and tolerant.
- Northerners are more concerned about status and appearances.
- Southerners are more liberal with their money while Northerners are more thrifty.
- Northerners are more socially conservative and afraid of change, while Southerners are more dynamic and more socially liberal.
- Southerners are more Westernized, while northerners are more Chinese, East European, Socialist and Communist-influenced.
- Southerners are more direct while the northerners are more formal.

=== Cuisine ===
Cuisine is one of the cultural differences between the regions. Northern Vietnam being the "cradle" of ethnic Vietnamese civilization, bears many of Vietnam's signature dishes (such as phở and bún chả). The cuisine is perceived to be complex in ingredients but simplistic in flavours.

The South's cuisine has been influenced by the cuisines of southern Chinese immigrants and indigenous Cambodians, and thus Southerners prefer sweet and sour flavors, respectively, in many dishes. Examples of sour-flavored food items include canh chua and green mango salad/green papaya salad. Southern cookery also tends to use a significantly larger variety of fresh ingredients while Northern cuisine much relies on preserved and dried goods. The cuisines of Southern Vietnam and Cambodia also share considerable similarities in ingredients, cooking style and food dishes, such as hủ tiếu Nam Vang.

Central Vietnamese cooking is distinct from the cuisines of both the Northern and Southern regions, in its use of many small side dishes and requiring more complex preparation (ingredient prep, cooking, serving, etc.). The royal cuisine of Hue places greater importance and food presentation, examples like bánh bèo and bánh bột lọc. It is also distinctive in its spiciness when compared to its counterparts, for example in bún bò Huế. Food items from this region also tend to be lesser in size of individual portions. Central Vietnam dishes also feature a large amount of seafood.

Certain unusual foods are more prevalent in one region than in another. For example, dog meat is much more popular in the North than in the South. Cat meat is also eaten in Northern parts of the country. Similarly, certain unordinary dishes and game meat, such as coconut worm or grilled rodent meat, while popular in other parts of the country, is uncommon in the North.

Southern Vietnam has a renowned coffee culture while tea is the preferred beverage in the North. Beer is more popular in the South and liquor is the North's choice of alcoholic drink.

=== Clothing ===
Traditional clothes are also often used to symbolize different regions. In women's attire, commonly the áo tứ thân is associated with the North, the áo ngũ thân with the central region (due to its emergence in the Vietnamese royal court in the 18th century), and the áo bà ba in the South (although many of these clothes are worn across different regions). However, the áo dài is now a very popular and widely worn ladies' attire nationwide.

=== Linguistic differences ===
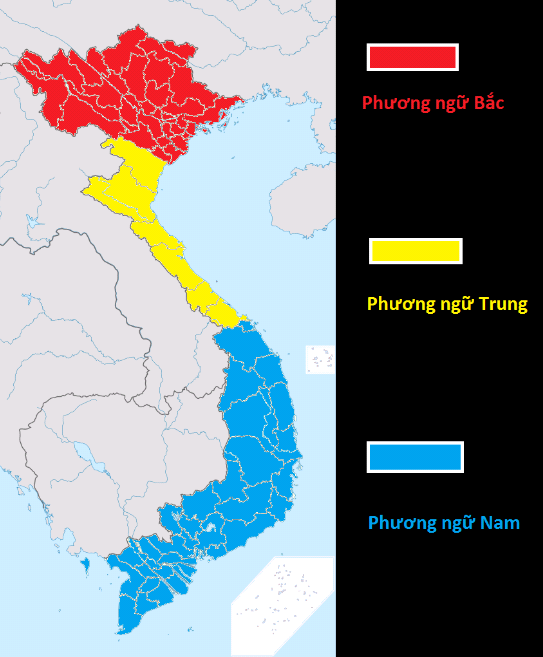
Map of main Vietnamese dialects

The Vietnamese language features many accents, the three major dialects are those of the North, Center, and South with major differences in phonology and vocabulary. Due to cultural prominence, the Hanoi and Saigon accents are mostly intelligible to speakers from other regions. The Central is marked by several minor dialects from the provinces of Nghệ An, Hà Tĩnh, Quảng Bình, Quảng Nam, and Quảng Ngãi are often unintelligible to speakers outside of these regions.

Differences in these accents lie in several different factors, including but not limited to the following:

- Pronunciation of words, an example would be: a Hanoi <d> is pronounced like the English /z/ while a Saigon <d> is pronounced like the English /j/.
- Northern Vietnamese has the full 6 tones, whereas Southern Vietnamese has only 5 (merging two of the tones into one)
- Words ending in "nh" are pronounced differently between North and South (See Vietnamese phonology for details)
- Merging of the "tr" and "ch" sounds in Northern Vietnamese
- Some differences in vocabulary between different regions
- Northerners speak with a higher-pitched accent.
- Central Vietnamese (in the North-Central Coast, from Nghệ An to Huế) speak in a high-pitched, diverse accents. In areas of Nghệ An, people living in different villages could speak in completely different accents.
- Southerners, along with the South Central Coast provinces of Bình Định, Phú Yên, Khánh Hòa, Ninh Thuận and Bình Thuận, speak in a lower-pitched, more monotone accent, which is also found in the accents of various aboriginal languages spoken by Montagnard hill tribe ethnicities.

In Central Vietnamese, the number of tones is reduced to 5 (om Quảng Trị and Huế accents) or only 4 (in Hà Tĩnh, Nghệ An and Quảng Bình accents). One of the distinctive feature of Central Vietnamese and Quảng Nam accent is the use of a different set of particles and pronouns, making it stand apart from Northern and Southern Vietnamese. For example, chi, mô, tê, răng and rứa (what, where, that, why and thus) are used instead of gì, đâu, kìa, sao and vậy in Standard Vietnamese.

While these differences may seem superficial to non-Vietnamese speakers, even the difference in phonology. The vocabulary of the different regions also differs, and the difference between Northern and Southern Vietnamese is quite striking.

Kinship terms are especially affected, as each term has a subtly different meaning in each region. In the South, the eldest child in a family is referred by the ordinal number two, while in the North "number two" refers to the second-eldest child. The vocabularies of the different regions also differ. Vocabulary differences can be confusing as sometimes the same word could have different meaning in each dialects. For example, the word mận refers to two different fruits: it is used for Prunus salicina (a type of plum) in the North, while in the South it refers to Syzygium samarangense (the rose apple). Similarly; chè is a dessert in Southern Vietnamese but in the Northern it has two meanings: tea and chè, ốm means sick in Northern Vietnamese and thin in Southern Vietnamese. "bông" refers to flower in Southern Vietnamese but means cotton in Northern Vietnamese, and the word địt refers to flatuence in the South but means "fuck" in the North.

=== Differences in climate ===
Vietnam map of Köppen climate classification

Vietnam is located in both a tropical and a temperate zone. It is characterized by strong monsoon influences, but has a considerable amount of sun, a high rate of rainfall, and high humidity. Regions located near the tropics and at high altitudes are endowed with a temperate climate.

Northern Vietnam has a humid subtropical climate, with a full four seasons, with much cooler temperatures than in the South (which has a tropical savanna climate), as well as winters that can get quite cold, sometimes with frost. The lowest temperature reached in Hanoi was 2.7 °C (36.9 °F) in 1955. Snow can even be (rarely) found in the high mountains of Northern Vietnam such as Sapa and Mount Mẫu Sơn when the region receives a strong cold wave.

Central and Southern Vietnam, which have a tropical climate, have only two main seasons: a dry season and a rainy season.

=== Miscellaneous cultural differences ===
- While Southern Vietnamese often ring in the Tết Nguyên Đán with yellow mai (Ochna integerrima) blossoms, Northern Vietnamese often prefer hoa đào (peach) blossoms.

== Names ==
During the Nguyễn dynasty and French colonial period, the regions were named as Bắc Kỳ (北圻), Trung Kỳ (中圻), and Nam Kỳ (南圻); these terms originated from the Minh Mạng period.

During the Japanese-sponsored Empire of Vietnam, these regions were renamed to Bắc Bộ (北部), Trung Bộ (中部), and Nam Bộ (南部) by Prime Minister Trần Trọng Kim. Following the creation of the State of Vietnam and the establishment of its government, the Chief of State Bảo Đại signed the two ordinances related to the administration and local governance of the State of Vietnam, namely Ordinance No. 1 ("Organisation and Operation of civil authorities in Vietnam") and Ordinance No. 2 ("Statutes of Government office"). The three regions were also known as Bắc Phần (北分), Trung Phần (中分), and Nam Phần (南分) from 1948 to 1975, and were sometimes referred to as Bắc Việt, Trung Việt, and Nam Việt.

Besides the three-part division, Vietnam has also been described through various two-part divisions, such as Đàng Ngoài and Đàng Trong during most of the 17th and 18th centuries, North Vietnam and South Vietnam during the Vietnam War, and the Septentrional and Meridional zones separated by the Bạch Mã Range in climatological classification.

== See also ==
- Nam tiến
- Northern and Southern dynasties (Vietnam)
- Vietnam under French rule: Tonkin, Annam, and Cochinchina
- Geographical exonyms: Tonkin and Cochinchina
- Trịnh–Nguyễn War: Đàng Ngoài and Đàng Trong
- Vietnam War: North Vietnam and South Vietnam
- List of regions of Vietnam
