= Yếm =

Traditional Vietnamese bodice

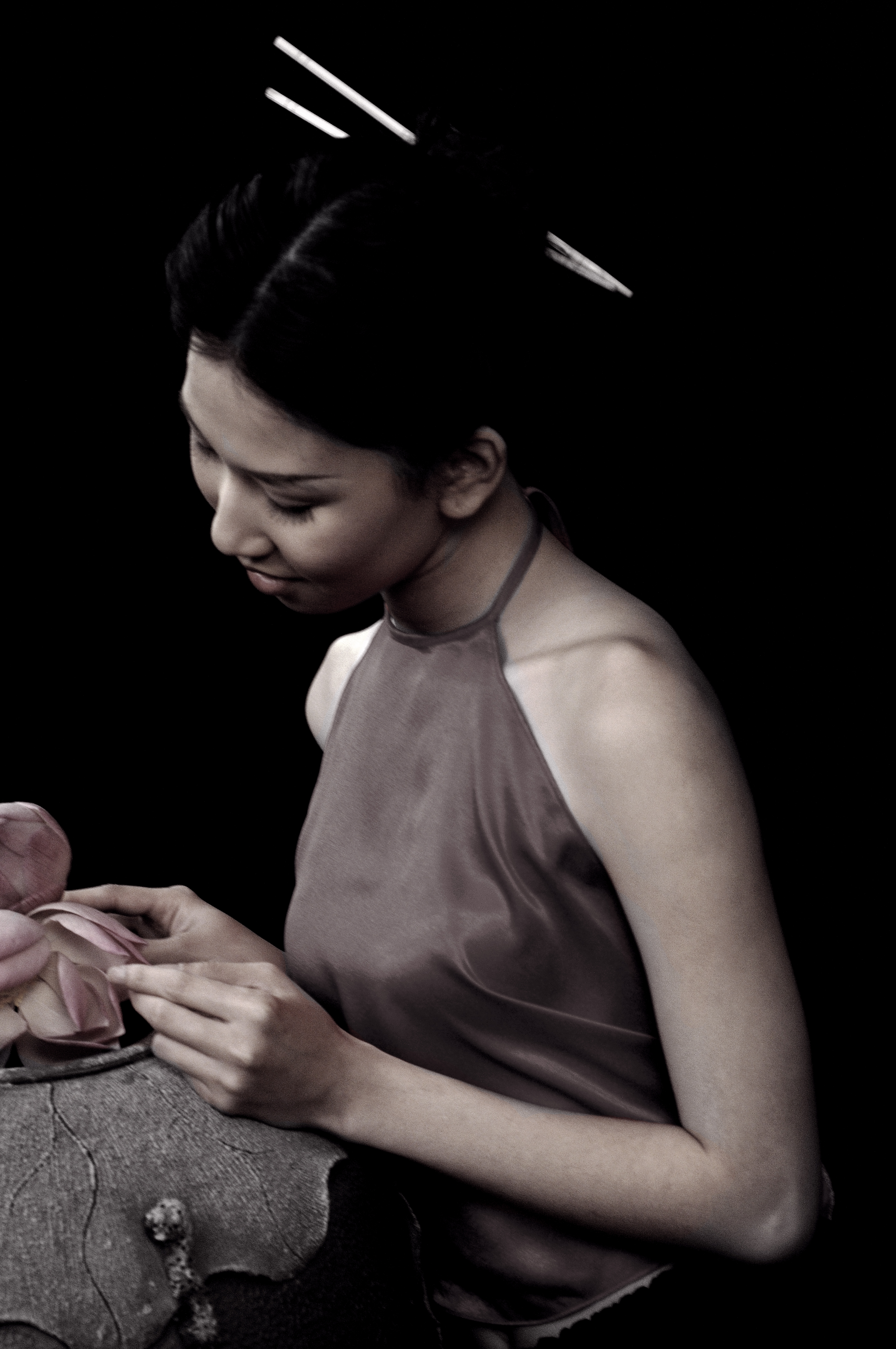
- Young woman wearing a yếm.

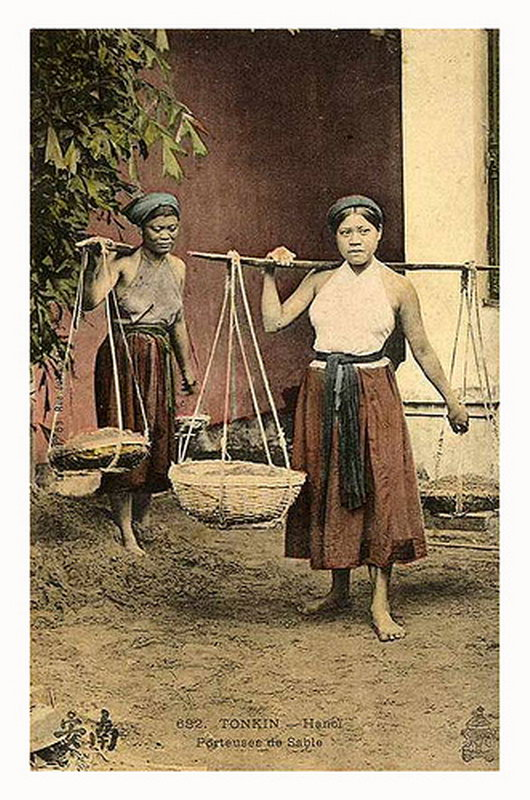
Two girls in yếm carry goods to sell

A yếm or áo yếm (Vietnamese: [ʔiəm˧˦], chữ Nôm: 裺 or 襖裺) is a traditional Vietnamese undergarment that was once worn by Vietnamese women across all classes. It was most usually worn underneath a blouse or mantle to preserve modesty.

It is a simple garment with many variations from its basic form, which is a simple, usually diamond or square-cut piece of cloth draped over a woman's chest with strings to tie at the neck and back.

== History ==
The yếm might have originated from the Chinese dudou, a variant of similar undergarments used in China since antiquity whose use spread under the Ming and Qing dynasties. During the late 19th until the 20th century, it was mainly worn by women in northern Vietnam. Unlike other Vietnamese clothing that helped to segregate the classes, the unseen yếm were worn as an undergarment by Vietnamese women of all walks of life, from peasant women toiling in the fields to imperial consorts. It is an integral part of the áo tứ thân costume, which it is often worn underneath.

The skirt which is worn with the yếm is called váy đụp.

After unification of Vietnam, the Nguyễn dynasty forced the whole country to adopt the costumes of Đàng Trong Kingdom, in which tunics and long trousers took the place of the yếm and skirt (váy đụp). The White Hmong were also affected, as the trousers replaced their traditional skirts. The áo dài was created when tucks, which were close fitting and compact, were added in the 1920s to this style. Trousers and tunics based on the Chinese pattern in 1774 were ordered by Nguyễn Phúc Khoát to replace the sarong-like traditional clothing.

Chinese clothing in the form of trousers and tunic were mandated by the Nguyễn dynasty. As late as the 1920s, in Vietnam's north area in isolated hamlets skirts were still worn. Ming, Tang, and Han dynasty-styled clothing was ordered to be adopted by Vietnamese military and bureaucrats by the Nguyễn lord Nguyễn Phúc Khoát. Pants were mandated by the Nguyễn in 1744 and the cheongsam inspired the áo dài. Chinese clothing started influencing Vietnamese dress during the Lý dynasty. The predecessor of the current áo dài (Áo ngũ thân) was introduced by the Nguyễn lords.

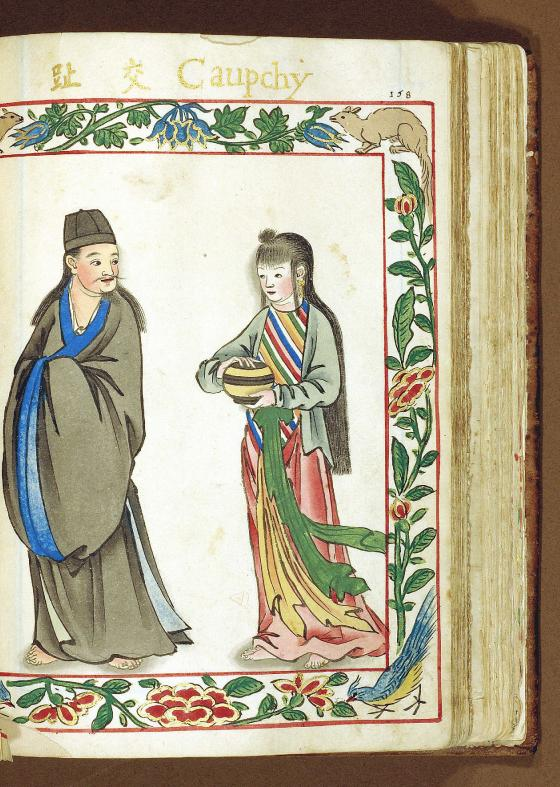
Women in Tonkin wear five-color yếm

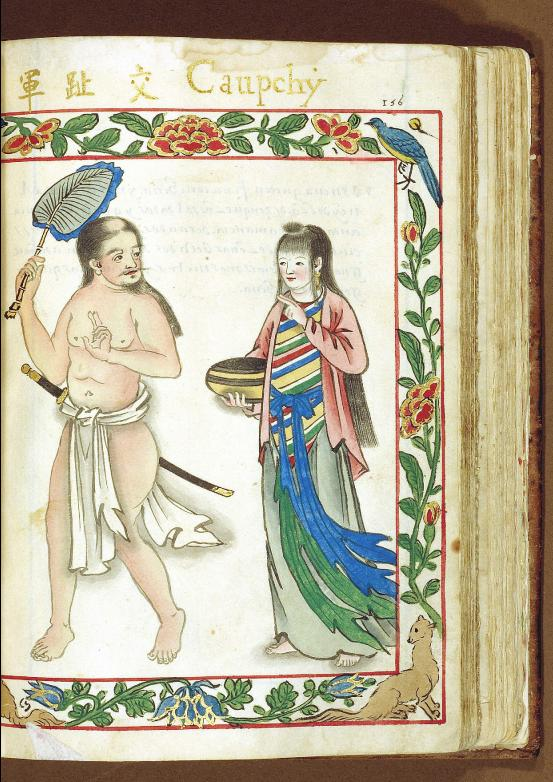
Women in Tonkin wear five-color yếm

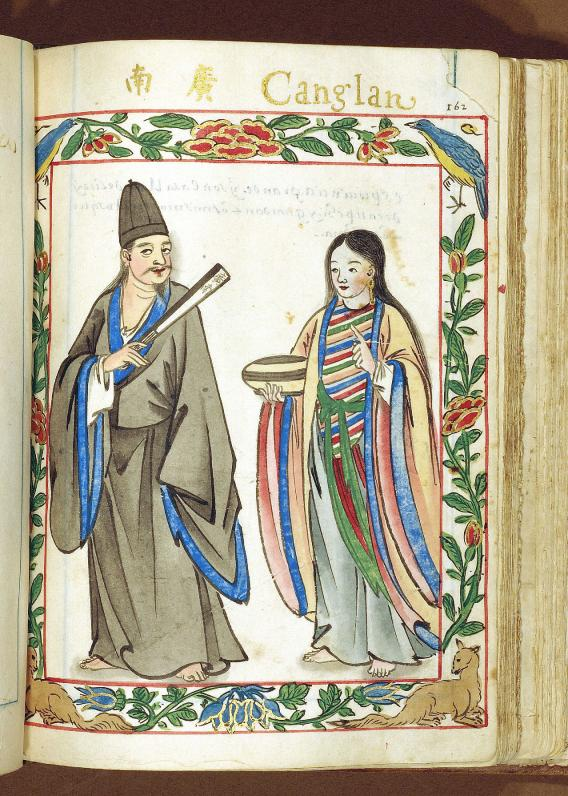
Women in Cochinchina wear five-color yếm

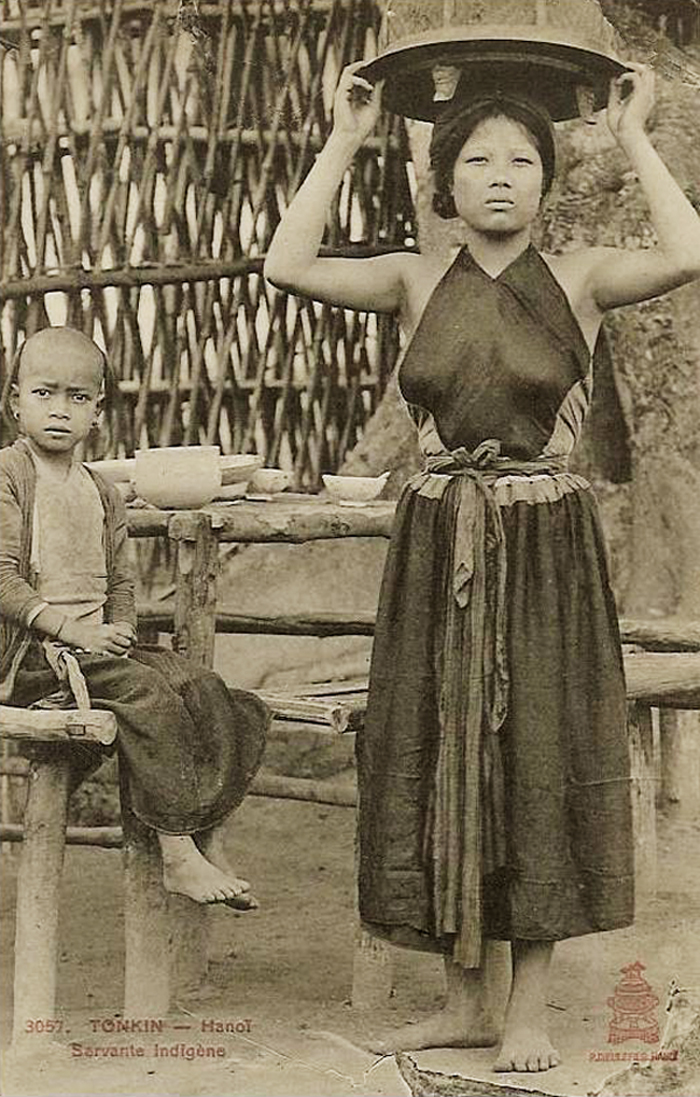
A woman in Hanoi wearing yếm and váy đụp

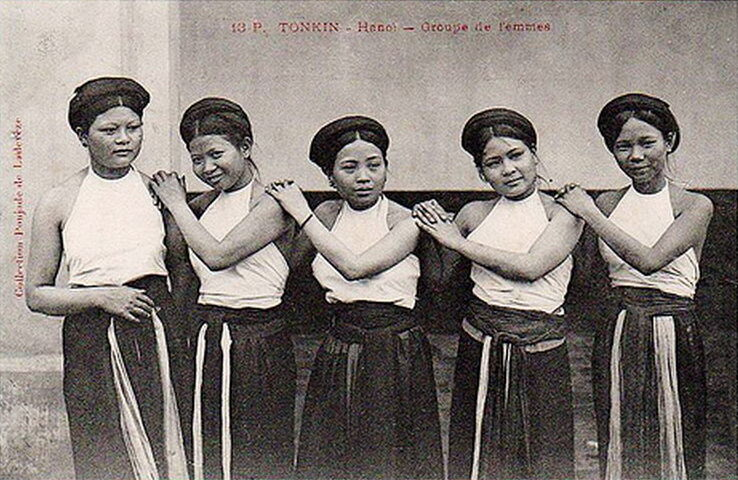
Girls in yếm and váy đụp

== Different types ==
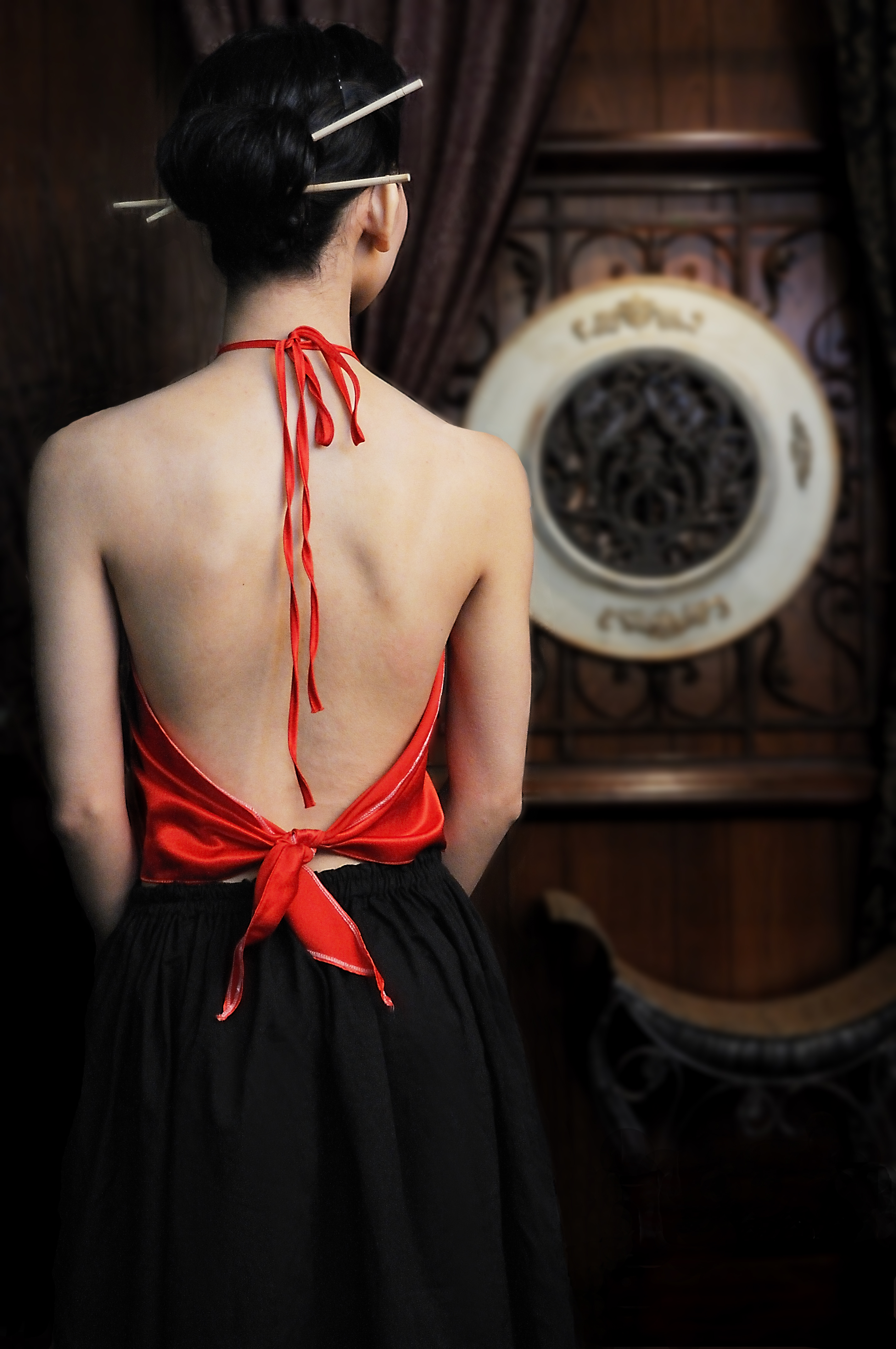
A yếm from the back

While it was worn across classes, the material and colors used to make yếm varied widely based upon the person's social status and the occasion. Commoner women usually wore yếm in simple blacks and whites for day to day use, whereas during special occasions they could opt for more festive, brighter colors such as red and pink. Indeed, much of Vietnamese poetry has been dedicated to the beauty of women in their vermilion bodices (yếm đào).

While the bottom of the yếm was usually v-shaped, there were different styles for the top of the garment which covered the neck, the most common two variations being the rounded neck or the v-shaped neck style.

Some types of yếm have a little pocket within, where women often used to store a little musk or perfume.

== In modern Vietnam ==
As Westernization reached Vietnam, by the 20th century women increasingly abandoned yếm for the Western bra.

Fashion designers, in their constant quest to revitalize interest in traditional costumes—as well as reinvent them—have created many new collections of yếm. The modernized form of the garment is slightly different, typically with support at the back, and is called "áo yếm" rather than "yếm", the latter term referring to the historical garment. Áo yếm has proven to be quite popular with young women, perhaps due to its similarity to the Western halterneck.

Today, áo yếm is most often seen in artistic performances with a traditional or historical motif.

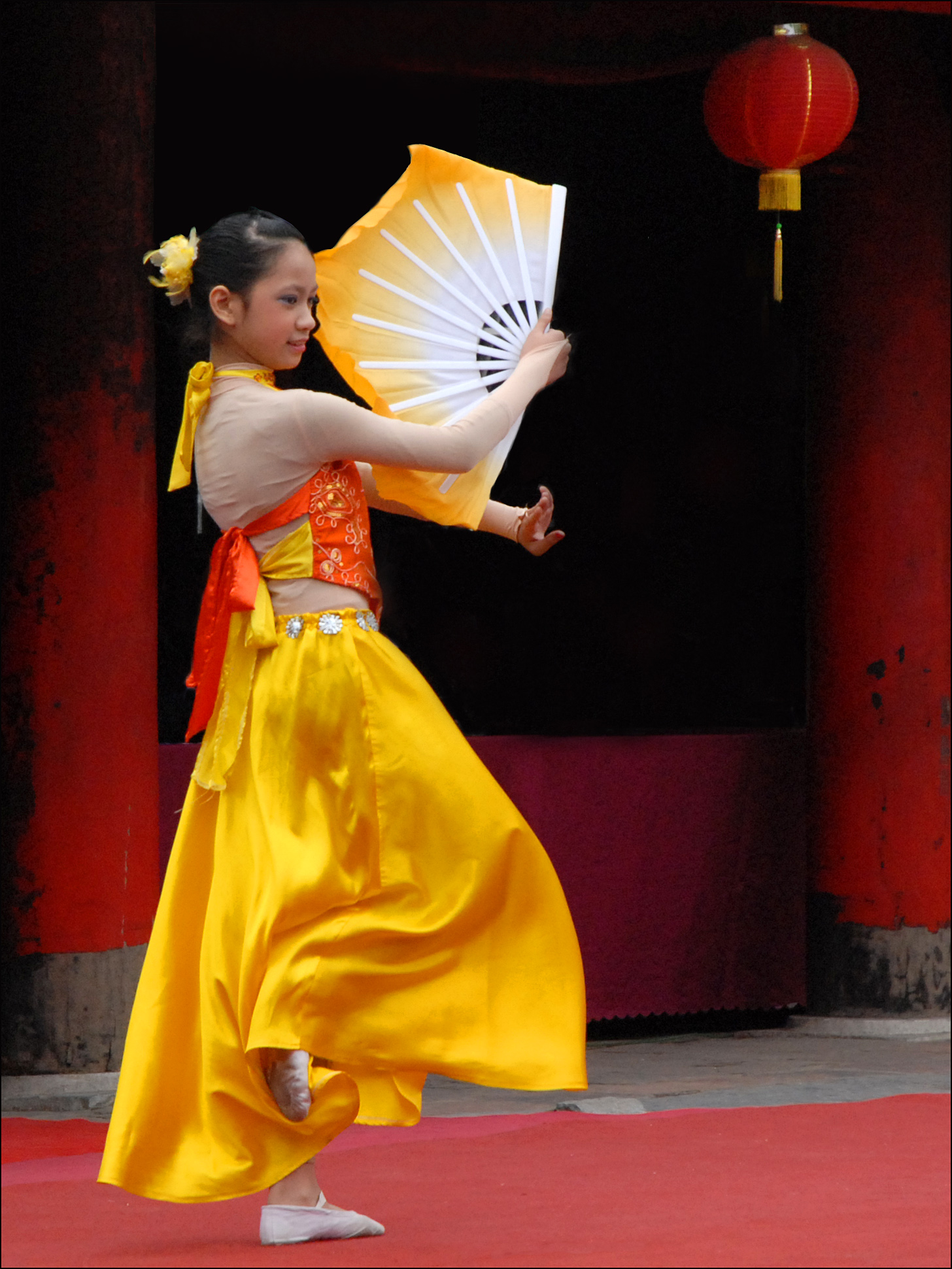
A female dancer wearing yếm

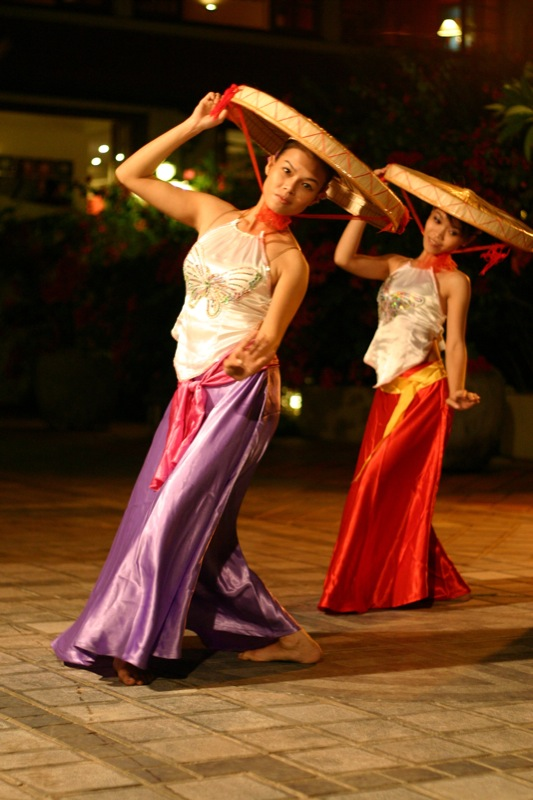
Two dancers wearing yếm

== See also ==
- Áo dài, Áo tứ thân, Áo giao lĩnh, and Áo bà ba
- Apron
- Choli, is an Indian bodice-like upper garment that evolved from the 6th century BC stanapatta or chest band
- Culture and History of Vietnam
- Vietnamese clothing
