= Áo tứ thân =

Traditional Vietnamese clothing

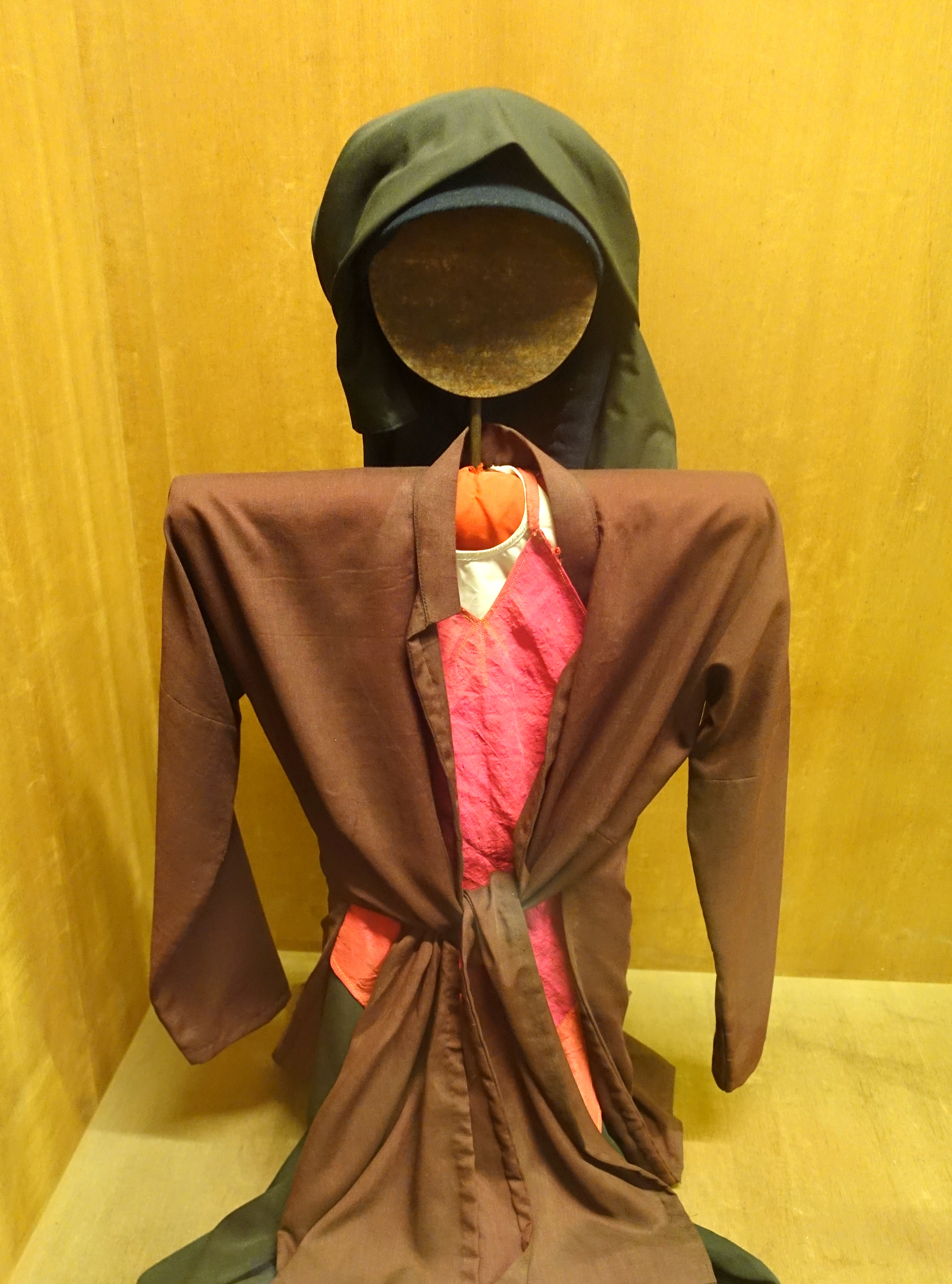
Mannequin wearing yếm, áo tứ thân and khăn mỏ quạ.

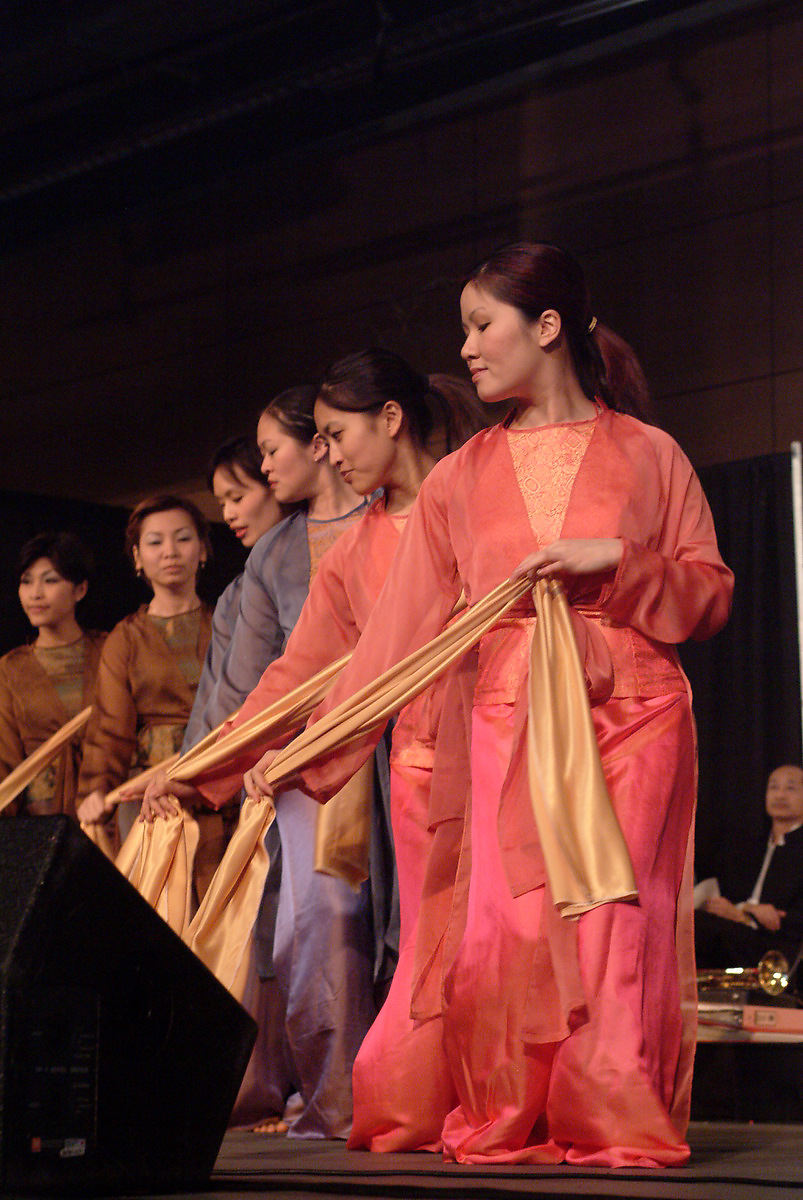
Dancers at a Vietnamese Tết Festival

The áo tứ thân (Vietnamese: [ʔaːw˧˦ tɨ˧˦ tʰən˧˧], four-piece shirt), is a traditional Vietnamese dress commonly worn in Northern Vietnam. The dress is related to the áo ngũ thân (five-piece shirt) and the áo đối khâm (parallel-flap robe).

== History ==
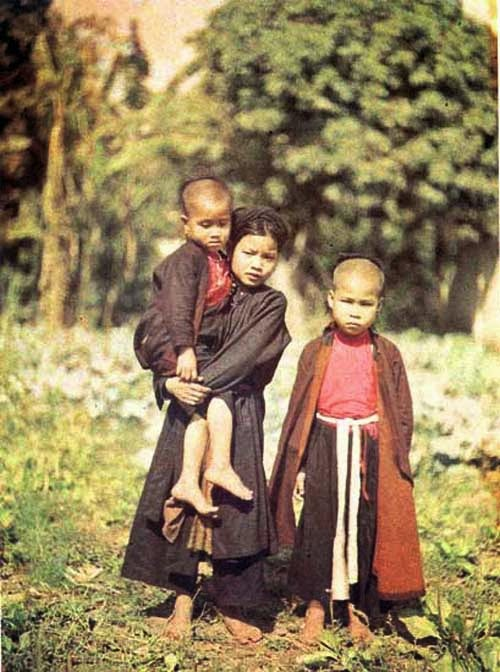
The girl on the right is wearing Áo tứ thân

The áo tứ thân was worn widely by women centuries before the áo dài. As Vietnam expanded southward during Nam tiến, áo tứ thân gradually became associated specifically with northern women.

== Dress ==
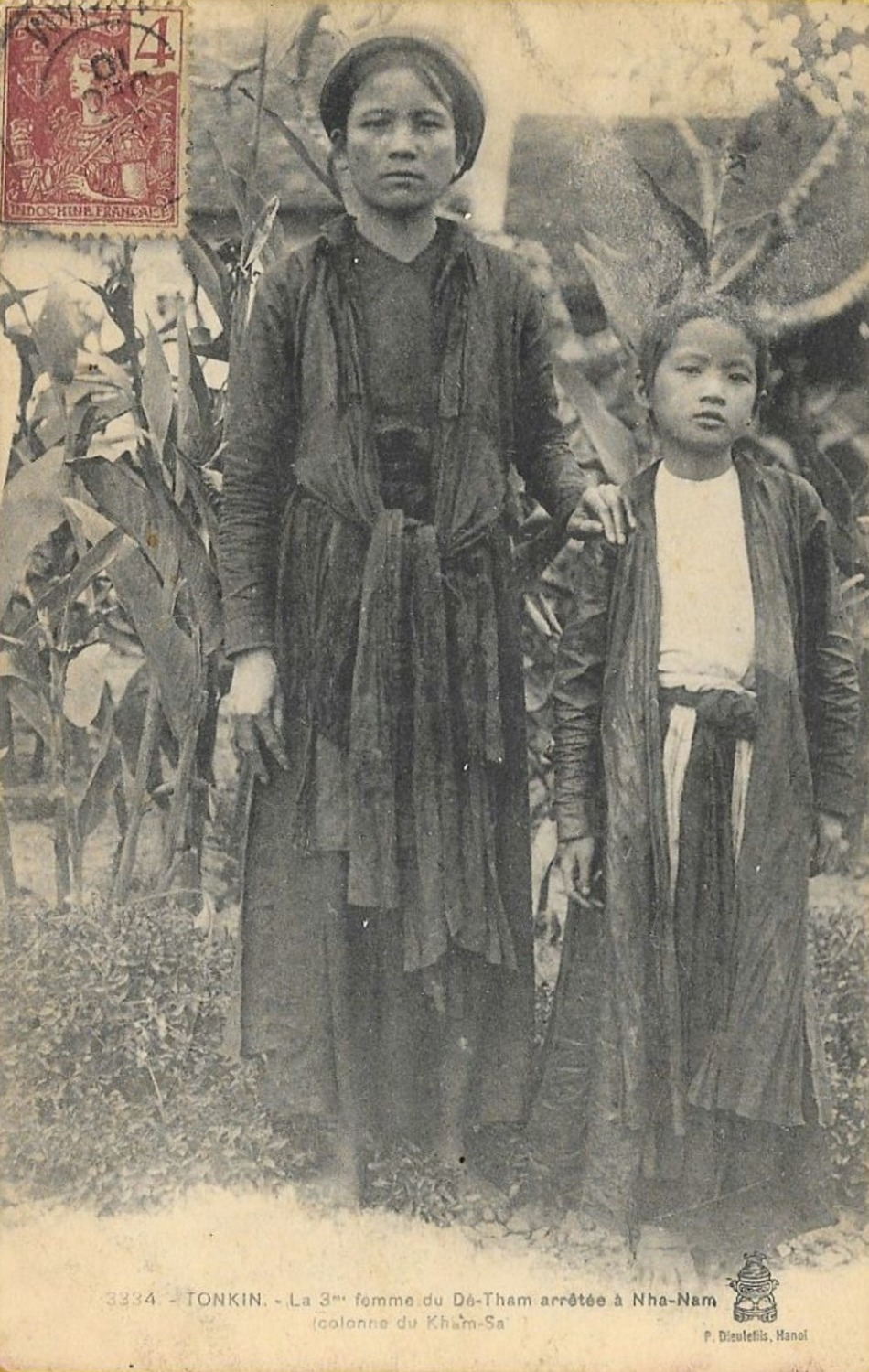
Mrs. Đặng Thị Nhu (Đề Thám's third wife) and her daughter in Áo tứ thân costume

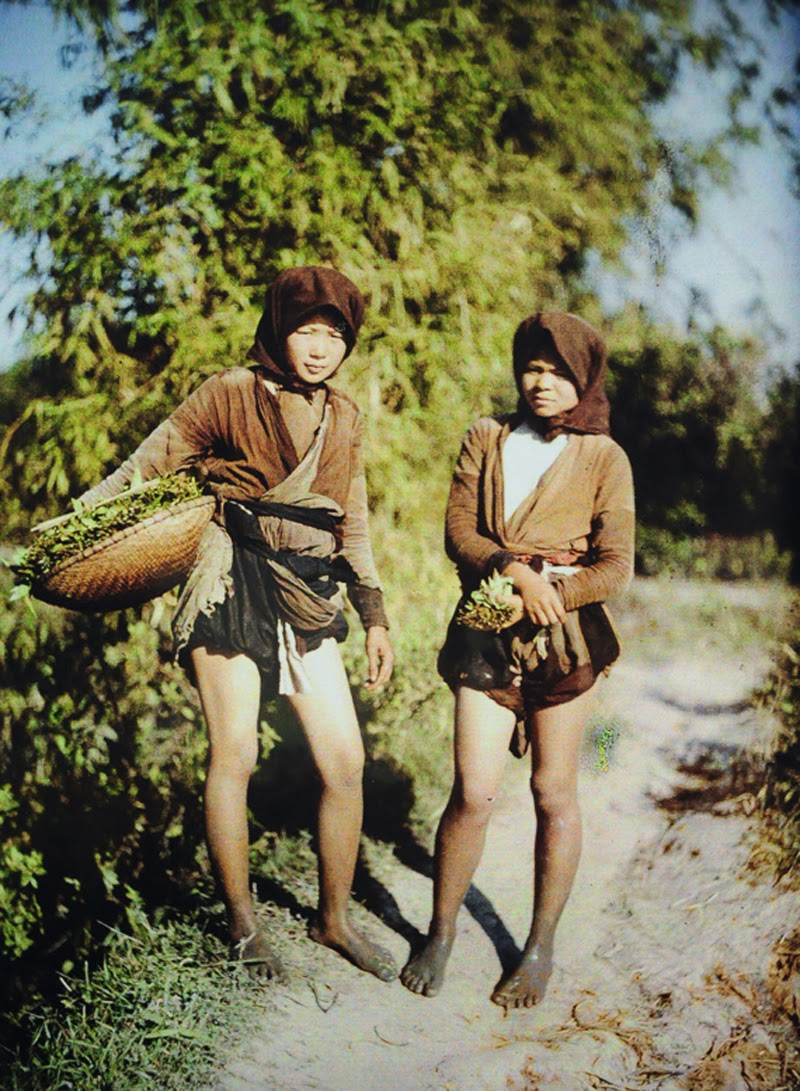
2 girls working in the fields in Áo tứ thân costumes

The áo tứ thân was the dress of peasant women, which explains why it was often made with plain fabric in dark colors, except when it was to be worn at special occasions such as festivals or weddings. Regardless of its many different forms, the basic áo tứ thân consists of:

- A flowing outer tunic, reaching almost to the floor. It is open at the front, like a jacket. At the waist the tunic splits into two flaps: a full flap in the back (made up of two flaps sewn together) and the two flaps in the front which are not sewn together but can be tied together or left dangling.
- A long skirt, worn under the tunic.
- Yếm, an ancient bodice worn as an undergarment by women. It comes in many fabrics and colors, worn under the skirt and outer tunic.
- A silk sash which is tied at the waist as a belt.

Áo tứ thân in modern-day Vietnam (worn almost exclusively in northern-related festivals) tends to be extremely colorful, using different hues throughout the dress, from the tunic to the bodice and the skirt.

== Place in modern-day Vietnam ==
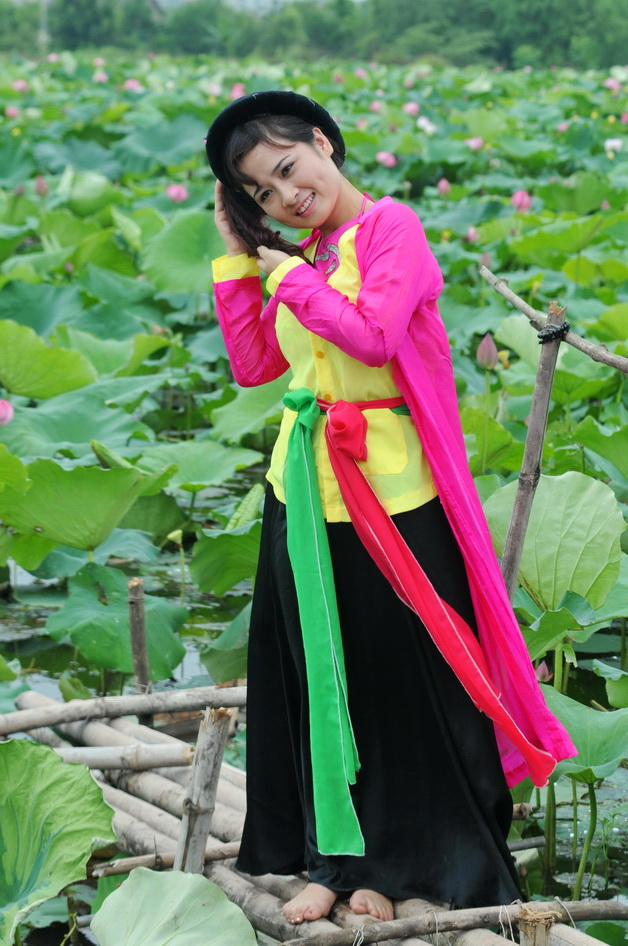
A woman wearing áo tứ thân, wearing a khăn vấn, taking pictures by the lotus lake

Áo tứ thân is now obsolete in terms of its daily use in Vietnam. However, it can be seen often in traditional occasions such as festivals, especially in northern Vietnam. It is still sometimes worn as formal wear by some ethnic minorities, such as the Tày, Sán Chay, and some Thổ people.

In southern Vietnam, the simpler silk two-piece ensemble áo bà ba is preferred for day-to-day use.

== See also ==
- Áo dài
- Yếm
- Vietnamese clothing
