= Climate of Vietnam =

Vietnam map of Köppen climate classification

Vietnam has a monsoon-influenced climate typical of that of mainland Southeast Asia. The diverse topography, long latitude (Vietnam spans over 15° of latitude), and influences from the South China Sea (locally known as the East Sea) lead to climatic conditions varying significantly between regions of Vietnam. The northern region experiences a monsoonal and humid subtropical climate with four distinct seasons (spring, summer, autumn, and winter) with winters typically dry and summers ranging from hot to mild. In southern and central areas, the climate is tropical monsoon with only two seasons (rainy and dry). In addition, a temperate climate exists in mountainous areas, which are found in Sa Pa and Da Lat, while a more continental climate exists in Lai Châu province and Sơn La province.

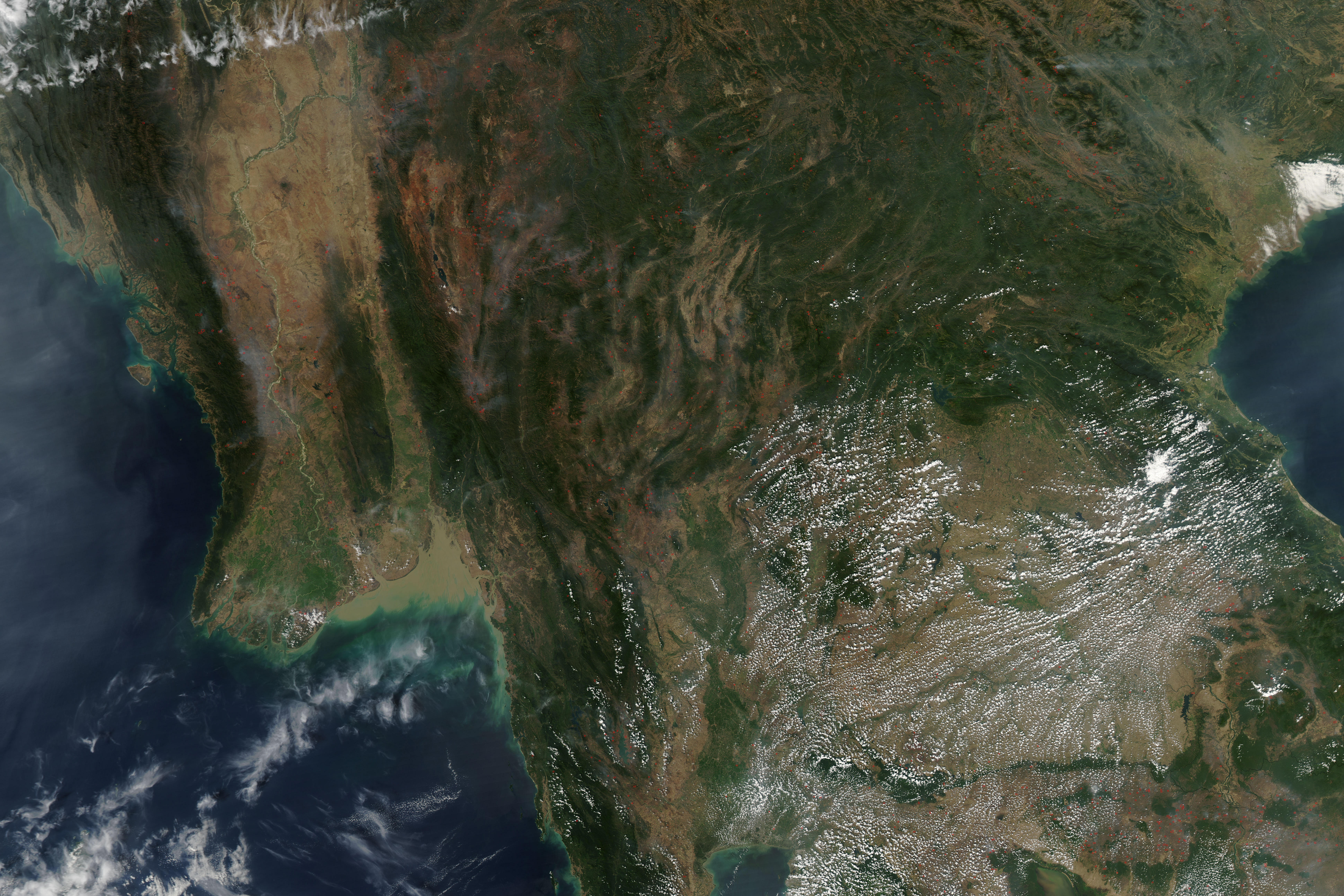
Hundreds of active fires burning across the hills and valleys of Myanmar, Thailand, Laos, and Vietnam (labeled with red dots)

According to Indra Overland (2017), 20% of Vietnam's total surface area is low-elevation coastal area, making the country highly vulnerable to climate change effects and the rising sea levels in particular. From 1960 to 2011, high increases of 0.24 °C and 0.28 °C per decade are found at Vung Tau and Ca Mau stations, respectively, located in the South Coast. Most of the stations in the North - Central Coast show an increase of 0.15 °C to 0.19 °C per decade. From 2007 to 2008, the flooding in the central provinces exceeded that of past 48 years; the northern part of Vietnam encountered an unprecedented cold wave, lasting for 38 days, resulting in 30 million US dollars Crop and livestock losses.

== Atmospheric circulation ==
The atmospheric circulation influencing Vietnam is part of the Southeast Asian monsoon circulation that is characterized by 3 distinct features:

1. Being, not only closely associated with the South Asian monsoon, especially in summer, but is also strongly influenced by the East Asian monsoon, especially in winter.
2. In addition to being influenced by tropical, subtropical and temperate circulations from the Northern Hemisphere, the atmospheric circulation influencing Vietnam are closely associated with subtropical and tropical circulations from the Southern Hemisphere.
3. Vietnam's climate is strongly influenced by its location to the adjacent sea in all seasons.

The two permanent atmospheric pressures that influence the atmospheric circulation of Vietnam are the equatorial low pressure, and the subtropical high pressure. Seasonal pressure centres that influence Vietnam include the Asian continental high pressure, the Aleutian Low, South Asian continental low-pressure centres, and oceanic continental high pressure centres. Across East Asia, the polar front moves southwards in winter, reaching down to 8°N in January as the southern limit while the northern limit of it is 25–27°N in July. Because all of Vietnam lies between the southern and northern limit of the polar front, Vietnam's climate are both influenced by polar air and tropical air (from the tropical convergent zone). In Vietnam, the monsoon circulation is a combination of both the South Asian and Northeast Asian monsoon systems. This leads to four distinct seasons of which Winter (November–October) and Summer (April–September) are the major ones while Spring (April) and Fall (October) are transitional ones.

Winter usually lasts from November until March. During winter, polar air originating from the Siberian High penetrate deeply into the low latitudes, facilitated by the eastern Tibetan Plateau that funnels the air southwards in a northeast direction (the cool air is a wind coming from the northeast). At the same time, a low pressure system over Australia strengthens that generates pressure gradients that intensify cold northeasterly winds. Many cold fronts can penetrate into Vietnam during winter of which there are 3-4 occurrences every month in northern Vietnam. This leads to cold temperatures where temperatures drop by 4 to 5 °C (7 to 9 °F). Cold weather, occasionally extreme cold can persist for a long time, being characterized by a long stretch of cloudless or partly cloudy days in the first half of winter or a long stretch of cloudy and drizzly conditions in the latter half of winter. Cold weather occurs more frequently in the north than in the south due to cold fronts penetrating the north more frequently.

The rainy season starts in late April/early May and lasts until October. In summer, the general wind pattern are southwesterly winds in the southern parts of Vietnam and southeasterly winds in northern Vietnam. The predominant air blocks in Vietnam are the equatorial and tropical blocks that originate from high pressure systems in the Southern Hemisphere, and a maritime tropical block originating from the subtropical high pressure system in the Pacific Ocean (Pacific subtropical high pressure). In addition, during summer, Vietnam is influenced by tropical air from the Bay of Bengal which occurs when a continental low pressure originating from South Asia (South Asian continental low) moves eastwards towards Vietnam, covering almost all of Vietnam and southern China; this causes hot, dry weather in the North Central Coast as westerly winds descend and warm adiabatically on the eastern slopes of the Annamite Range (Truong Son range). On average, 11 storms and tropical low pressures develop in the South China Sea during summer of which half are tropical cyclones that originate from the western Pacific. These storms and cyclones then move westwards towards Vietnam. On average, Vietnam is affected by 6–8 typhoons or tropical cyclones per year.

Spring and Fall are transitional seasons. The atmospheric circulation in these seasons represent a transition between winter–summer and summer–winter respectively. In general, the northern parts of the country have four seasons: winter, spring, summer, and fall (autumn). In the south, only two seasons are present: a dry and a wet season.

== Temperature ==
Mean annual temperatures in the country, based on meteorological data from weather stations range from 12.8 to 27.7 °C (55 to 82 °F) in Hoàng Liên Sơn. At the highest altitudes in the Hoang Lien Son range, mean annual temperatures is only 8 °C (46 °F). As temperatures vary by altitude, temperatures decrease by 0.5 °C (1 °F) for every 100 metres (328 ft) increase in altitude. The lowest mean annual temperatures are found in the mountainous areas, where the altitude is higher, and in northern areas, because of their higher latitudes. Because Vietnam is strongly influenced by the monsoon, the mean temperatures in Vietnam are lower than other countries located at the same latitude in Asia.

In winter, mean temperatures range from 1 to 28 °C (34 to 82 °F), which decreases from south to north, and/or as one climbs up its mountains, and vice versa. In the coolest month, mean temperatures range from 11 to 17 °C (52 to 63 °F) in the northern highlands to 21 to 25 °C (70 to 77 °F) in the southern highlands. Generally, mean winter temperatures are below 20 °C (68 °F) in many northern locations. In addition to lower insolation in winter, the Northeast Monsoon contributes to colder conditions. Many mountainous areas in the north have experienced subzero conditions. In contrast, temperatures in the Spratly Islands never falls below 21 °C (70 °F). In summer, mean temperatures vary between 25 and 30 °C (77 and 86 °F). The highest temperatures normally occurs in March–May in the south and May–July in the north. This is due to the fact that in the north, drizzle predominates leading to a slight temperature increases in February and March before increasing from April–August while in the south, the temperature increase (from December–February/March) is much larger. Consequentially, the south reaches their highest temperatures in late winter while in the north, they occur in July and August due to this. Temperatures in summer are relatively equal among the northern and southern parts of the country with differences being mostly due to altitude (the decrease in temperature is predominantly due to altitude).

In May 2023, the country experienced an unprecedented heatwave where sections of the country registered temperatures over 40 °C. One recording saw the weather reach a record high 44.1 °C at the Hoi Xuan station, breaking the 43.4 °C record set in 2019 according to the National Centre for Hydro Meteorological Forecasting.

== Precipitation ==
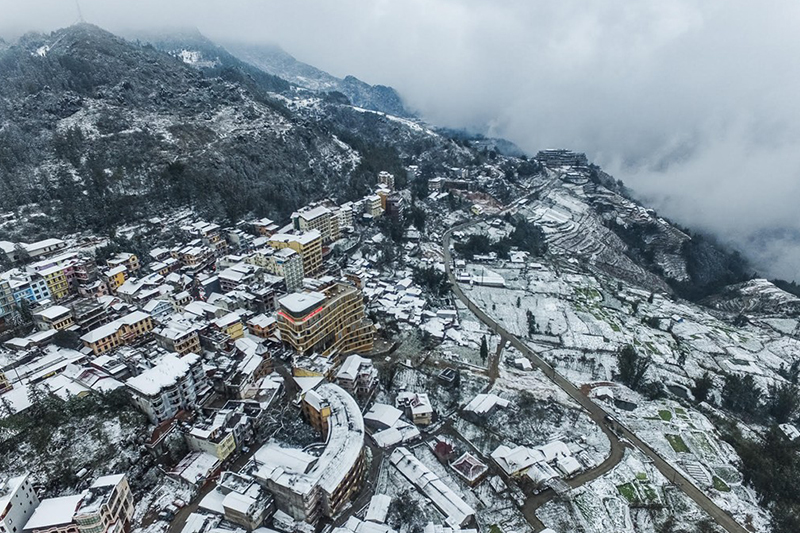
Snowfall in Sa Pa

Mean annual rainfall in the country ranges from 700 to 5,000 mm (28 to 197 in) although most places in Vietnam receive between 1,400 and 2,400 mm (55 and 94 in). Bạch Mã National Park is the wettest place in Vietnam, which annual precipitation is 3,500 mm (140 in) and up to 8,000 mm (310 in) at the 1,448-metres tall summit. Two cities Phan Rang and Phan Rí receive the least amount of rainfall, with 695 mm (27.4 in) and 400 mm (16 in) each year, respectively. The majority of rainfall occurs during the rainy season, which is responsible for 80%–90% of the annual precipitation. Generally, northern parts of the country receive more rainfall than southern parts of the country. Islands located in the north general receive less rainfall than the adjacent mainland while in the south, this is reversed where islands such as Phú Quốc receive more rainfall than the adjacent mainland.

The annual average number of rainy days ranges from 60 to 200 in which most days have rainfall averaging less than 5 mm (0.20 in). The amount of rainy days in a month usually corresponds with the mean monthly precipitation although in the north and north central coast, drizzle is common in winter (despite being the drier season), leading to higher amounts of rain days. For example, there are more rainy days in the drier season during winter in Yên Bái Province due to drizzle than there are rainy days in the main rainy season. Drizzle is a weather phenomenon that is characteristic of the weather in winter in the north and north central coast. Days with thunderstorms occur 20–80 days per year, which are more common in the south and north, and more common in mountainous areas than coastal delta. Thunderstorms can occur year-round although they are the most common during the rainy season. In the highest peaks in the north in Sa Pa, Tam Dao, and Hoang Lien Son, snowfall can occur.

Depending on the region, the onset of the rainy season (defined as when the monthly average precipitation exceeds 100 mm (3.9 in)) differs: In the North West and North East, the rainy season beings in April–May with a peak in July–August and ends in September and October. In the Red River Delta (North Delta), the rainy season beings in April–May with a peak in July–August and ends in October and November. On the North Central Coast, the rainy season begins in August and September, reaching a peak in October and November before ending in November and December. For the South Central Coast, the rainy season begins in August and September, reaching a peak in October and November before ending in December. In the Central Highlands, the rainy season begins in April and May that peaks in August before ending in October and November. Finally, the South has its rainy season beginning in May.

== Regional climate ==
Regions of Vietnam

Based on geographic and climatic conditions, there are 7 different climatic regions in Vietnam: Northwest (Region 1), Northeast (Region 2), North Delta (Red River Delta/Region 3), North Central (North Central Coast/Region 4), South Central (South Central Coast/region 5), Central Highlands (region 6), and the South (region 7). These seven regions are widely accepted within the Vietnamese climatological community. Generally, they are grouped into two macroregions: the Septentrional (regions 1–4) and the Meridional (regions 5–7), separated by the Bạch Mã Range, approximately at the 16.1st parallel. These climatic regions are based on time of rainy season and other climatic elements such as insolation, sunshine, temperature, precipitation, and humidity. The diverse topography, wide range of latitudes (Vietnam spans over 15° of latitude), and influences from the South China Sea lead to climatic conditions varying significantly between regions.

=== Northwest ===
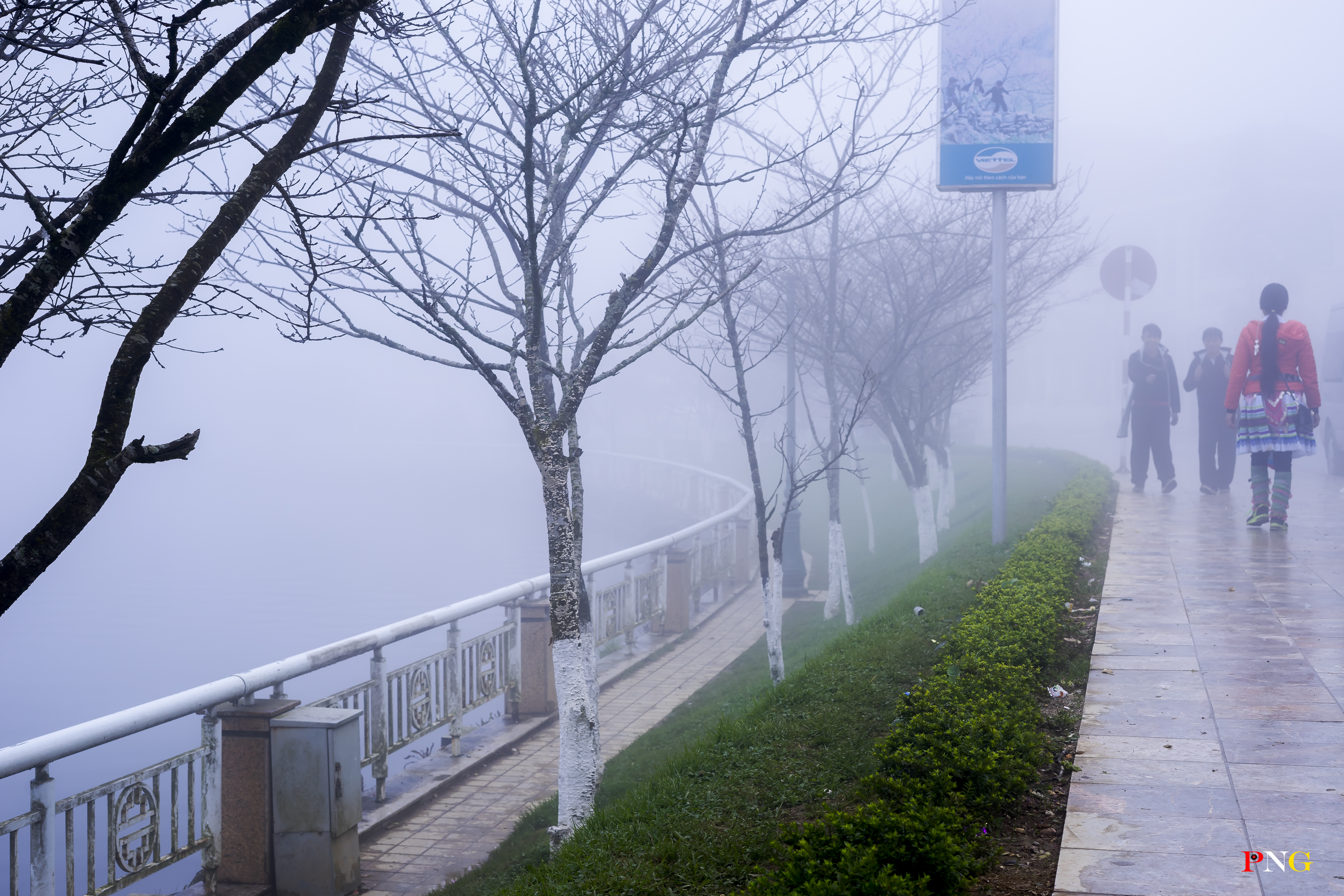
Natural fog in northwest Vietnam (Tây Bắc).

The Northwest region includes the provinces of Lai Châu, Sơn La, and Điện Biên. The climate is characterized by cold, dry (little drizzly rain), sunny winters in which hoarfrost is common in many years. Summers are hot and rainy, coinciding with the rainy season although there is a high frequency of hot, dry days caused by westerly winds. Valleys are sheltered from wind, leading to a longer dry season and lower annual rainfall.

The dry season usually lasts for 4–5 months. The average annual amount of sunshine hours is 1,800 to 2,000. Owing to diverse terrain and climate in this region, this leads to different types of forests being present.

=== Northeast ===
The Northeast region includes the northern and northeastern provinces: Lào Cai, Yên Bái, Hòa Bình, Hà Giang, Tuyên Quang, Phú Thọ, Cao Bằng, Lạng Sơn, Bắc Kạn, Thái Nguyên, and Quảng Ninh. The climate is strongly influenced by the northeast monsoon. Winters are cold, cloudy (little sunshine) that is characterized by drizzle. The cold comes earlier than other provinces. Summers are hot and rainy that coincide with the rainy season. However, unlike the northwest, dry conditions are rare due to a low frequency of westerly winds.

The rainy season usually lasts from May–September although its duration can vary from 4 to 10 months. In the Hoang Lien Son mountains, winters are cold where snowfall and hoarfrost can occasionally occur. These mountains have the highest rainfall in the country. The average annual amount of sunshine hours is 1,400 to 1,700.

Mean annual temperatures in the coastal areas are around 23 °C (73 °F) in which the coldest month has a mean temperature of 16 °C (61 °F) and the hottest month has a mean temperature of 28 °C (82 °F). Average annual rainfall in coastal areas is approximately 1,800 mm (71 in).

=== Northern Delta ===
The North Delta includes the provinces of Phú Thọ, Vĩnh Phúc, Bắc Giang, Bắc Ninh, Hanoi, Hai Phong, Hải Dương, Hưng Yên, Hà Nam, Nam Định, Thái Bình, and Ninh Bình. Winters are characterized as being cold with large amounts of drizzle and little sunshine while summers are hot, rainy with few dry days. Hot, dry conditions caused by westerly winds during summer are rare. The region has a positive water balance (i.e. the precipitation exceeds the potential evapotranspiration). The average annual amount of sunshine hours is 1,400 to 1,700.

Mean annual temperatures in the coastal areas are around 23 °C (73 °F) in which the coldest month has a mean temperature of 16 to 17 °C (61 to 63 °F) and the hottest month has a mean temperature of 28 to 30 °C (82 to 86 °F). Average annual rainfall in coastal areas is approximately 1,600 to 1,700 mm (63 to 67 in).

=== North Central ===
The North Central Coast includes the provinces of Thanh Hóa, Nghệ An, Hà Tĩnh, Quảng Bình, Quảng Trị, and Thừa Thiên-Huế. Winters are characterized by cold, cloudy weather with frequent drizzle, being under the influence of the northeast monsoon. Compared to other regions in Northern Vietnam, winters are warmer and wetter due to the influence of the Truong Son Mountains that block the northeast monsoon coming from the Gulf of Tonkin. Summers are characterized by hot, dry weather owing to westerly winds. This is because the Truong Son Mountains also block the southwest monsoon, causing rainfall to occur on the west side of the mountains in Laos and creating a dry Foehn wind that moves east on the eastern slopes in Vietnam. The region averages between 1,500 and 1,700 hours of sunshine per year.

Mean annual temperatures are around 24 to 25 °C (75 to 77 °F) in which the coldest month has a mean temperature of 17 to 20 °C (63 to 68 °F) and the hottest month has a mean temperature of 29 to 30 °C (84 to 86 °F). Average annual rainfall in coastal areas is approximately 2,000 to 2,900 mm (79 to 114 in). The rainy season occurs in the last 6 months of the year with September and October having the highest rainfall.

=== South Central Coast ===
Da Nang City, Quảng Nam, Quảng Ngãi, Bình Định, Phú Yên, Khánh Hòa, Ninh Thuận, and Bình Thuận are the provinces that are part of the South Central Coast region. Winters are warm and sunny while summers are hot and dry owing to a high frequency of the westerly winds. The average annual amount of sunshine hours is 2,000 to 2,500. The rainfall pattern is similar to the North Central Coast (region 4).

Mean annual temperatures are around 25 to 27 °C (77 to 81 °F) while the coldest month has a mean temperature of 22 to 25 °C (72 to 77 °F) and the hottest month has a mean temperature of 28 to 30 °C (82 to 86 °F). In contrast to the North Central Coast, the temperature difference between the coldest and hottest months is much smaller. Average annual rainfall in coastal areas is approximately 1,900 mm (75 in) although some areas in the southern parts of the region receive between 800 and 1,100 mm (31 and 43 in). As one progresses southward, the rainy season shifts away from the end of year (occurs more earlier) and vice versa. In general, the rain season starts in September and ends in December or January. Northern parts of the region (Quảng Nam and Quảng Ngãi) receive more rainfall than in the southern parts of the region (Bình Thuận and Ninh Thuận).

=== Central Highlands ===
The Central Highlands (Tây Nguyên) includes Kon Tum Province, Gia Lai Province, Đắk Lắk Province, Đắk Nông Province, and Lâm Đồng Province. Owing to the higher altitude, temperatures are lower than other regions at comparable latitudes. Winters are dry while summers are characterized by high rainfall. The average sunshine hours is 2,000 to 2,500 per year.

The average annual temperature is 21 to 23 °C (70 to 73 °F). During winter, mean temperatures can fall below 20 °C (68 °F). The coldest month is January where minimum temperatures can occasionally fall below 0 °C (32 °F). The highest temperatures occur in late winter and early summer. This is usually during March and April.

=== Southern ===
The South corresponds to the Southeast region, and the Mekong Delta region. It also includes some parts of Bình Thuận Province. The climate of the south is strongly influenced by the southwest monsoon. The climate of this region is characterized by high temperatures year round and sunny weather. Mean annual temperatures in coastal areas are around 27 °C (81 °F) that is fairly even throughout the year with little difference between the coldest and hottest months of the year. Average annual rainfall in coastal areas is approximately 1,500 to 2,500 mm (59 to 98 in) in which the rainy season is between May and November. The average annual sunshine hours ranges from 2,400 to 3,000. Sunshine hours are higher in the northeastern parts of the region where they exceed over 2,700 hours per year while in the west, it is around 2,300 hours per year.

== Extremes ==
The highest temperature ever recorded in Vietnam was 44.2 °C, which was recorded in Tương Dương district, Nghệ An Province on 7 May, 2023. The coldest temperature recorded in Vietnam was −6.1 °C (21.0 °F) in Sa Pa on 4 January 1974. A record low of −6.0 °C (21.2 °F) was also record in Hoang Lien on 1 January 1974 and 6 January 1974. For ground temperatures, the lowest ground temperature ever record was −6.4 °C (20.5 °F) in Sa Pa on 31 December 1975 while the highest was 74.7 °C (166.5 °F) in Buôn Ma Thuột on 23 May 1982. Absolute record low ground temperatures tend to be 1 to 2 °C (2 to 4 °F) lower than record low air temperatures but absolute record high ground temperatures tend to be over 30 °C (54 °F) higher than the air temperature. The highest air pressure ever recorded in Vietnam was at the Lang weather station on 18 November 1996 when a reading of 1,035.9 hPa (30.59 inHg) was recorded. The lowest air pressure ever recorded was at Sa Pa on 24 July 1971 with a reading of 827.0 hPa (24.42 inHg). The highest wind recorded in Vietnam was 59 m/s (190 ft/s) in Quy Nhon in September 1972 although wind velocities over 40 m/s (130 ft/s) have been recorded in the North Delta (Red River Delta), and coastal areas of Quảng Ninh Province

== Climate change ==
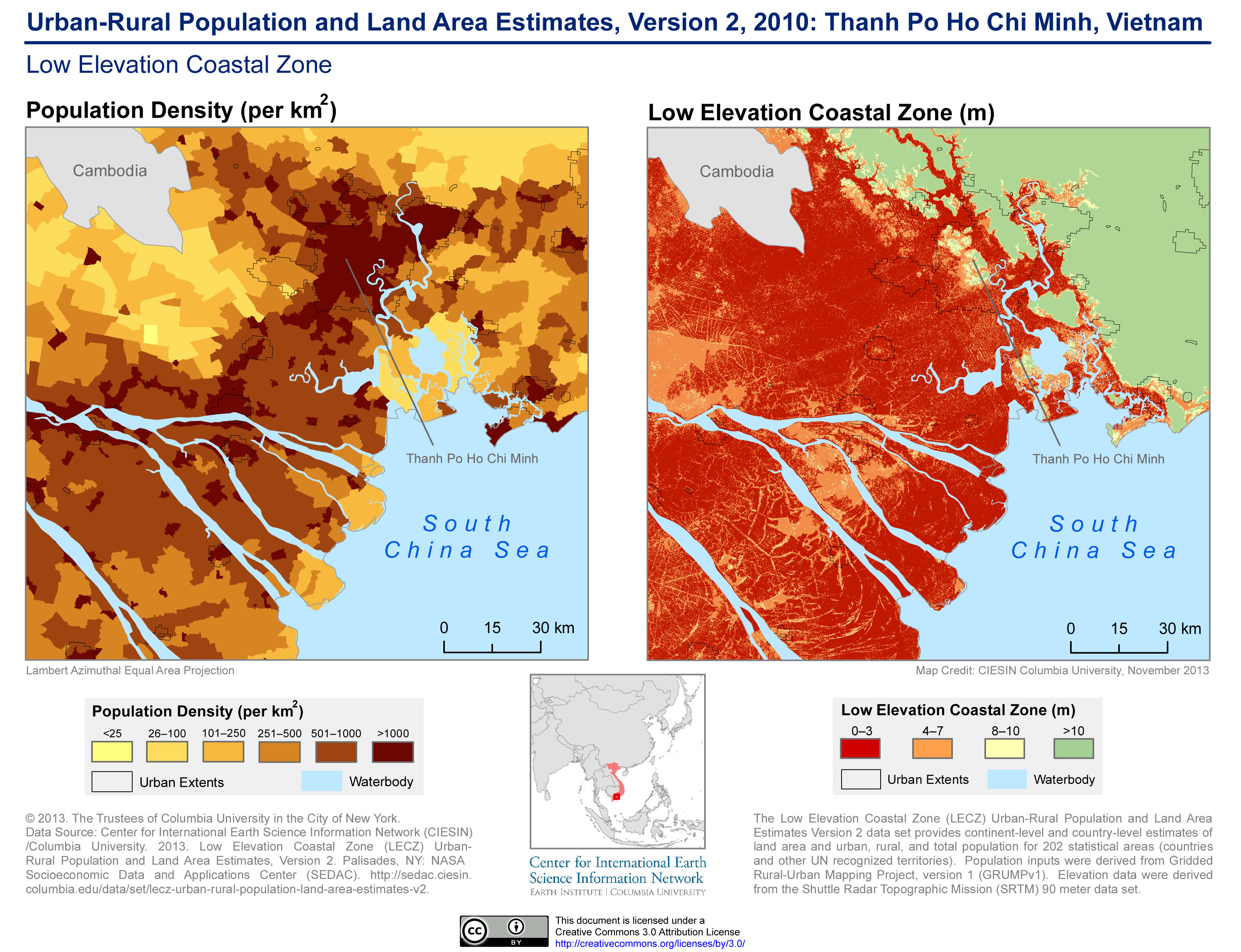
Population density and elevation above sea level in Ho Chi Minh City (2010)

Vietnam is among the most affected countries by global climate change. A large number of studies show that Vietnam is experiencing climate change and will be severely negatively affected in coming decades. These negative effects include sea level rise, salinity intrusion and other hydrological problems like floods, river mouth evolution and sedimentation. Natural hazards such as cold waves, storm surges will increase in frequency, with negative effects on the country's development, infrastructure and economy.

Some issues, such as land subsidence (caused by excessive groundwater extraction) further worsen some of the effects climate change will bring (sea level rise) especially in areas such as the Mekong Delta. The government, NGOs, and citizens have taken various measures to mitigate and adapt to the impact.

== Statistics ==
=== Temperature ===
Average Temperatures in various locations in Vietnam in °C (°F)
Location	Jan	Feb	Mar	Apr	May	Jun	Jul	Aug	Sept	Oct	Nov	Dec	Annual
Điện Biên Phủ	16.3 (61.3)	18.0 (64.4)	20.9 (69.6)	23.7 (74.7)	25.5 (77.9)	26.0 (78.8)	25.8 (78.4)	25.5 (77.9)	24.7 (76.5)	22.6 (72.7)	19.4 (66.9)	16.2 (61.2)	22.0 (71.6)
Sa Pa	8.7 (47.7)	10.3 (50.5)	13.9 (57.0)	17.0 (62.6)	18.9 (66.0)	19.7 (67.5)	19.9 (67.8)	19.6 (67.3)	18.1 (64.6)	15.7 (60.3)	12.4 (54.3)	9.5 (49.1)	15.3 (59.5)
Yên Bái	15.7 (60.3)	16.8 (62.2)	19.7 (67.5)	23.5 (74.3)	26.7 (80.1)	28.0 (82.4)	28.1 (82.6)	27.8 (82.0)	26.6 (79.9)	24.1 (75.4)	20.6 (69.1)	17.3 (63.1)	22.9 (73.2)
Cao Bằng	13.8 (56.8)	15.1 (59.2)	18.8 (65.8)	22.9 (73.2)	25.9 (78.6)	27.0 (80.6)	27.0 (80.6)	26.7 (80.1)	25.4 (77.7)	22.5 (72.5)	18.5 (65.3)	15.1 (59.2)	21.6 (70.9)
Hạ Long	16.1 (61.0)	16.6 (61.9)	19.3 (66.7)	23.1 (73.6)	26.8 (80.2)	28.2 (82.8)	28.6 (83.5)	27.9 (82.2)	27.0 (80.6)	24.7 (76.5)	21.2 (70.2)	17.8 (64.0)	23.1 (73.6)
Hà Giang	15.5 (59.9)	16.9 (62.4)	20.3 (68.5)	24.0 (75.2)	26.7 (80.1)	27.6 (81.7)	27.6 (81.7)	27.4 (81.3)	26.3 (79.3)	23.7 (74.7)	20.1 (68.2)	16.7 (62.1)	22.7 (72.9)
Hanoi	16.4 (61.5)	17.2 (63.0)	20.0 (68.0)	23.9 (75.0)	27.4 (81.3)	28.9 (84.0)	29.2 (84.6)	28.6 (83.5)	27.5 (81.5)	24.9 (76.8)	21.5 (70.7)	18.2 (64.8)	23.6 (74.5)
Tam Đảo	11.2 (52.2)	12.2 (54.0)	15.3 (59.5)	18.8 (65.8)	21.7 (71.1)	23.0 (73.4)	23.2 (73.8)	22.8 (73.0)	21.6 (70.9)	19.1 (66.4)	15.9 (60.6)	12.7 (54.9)	18.1 (64.6)
Vinh	17.5 (63.5)	17.9 (64.2)	20.4 (68.7)	24.1 (75.4)	27.7 (81.9)	29.4 (84.9)	29.7 (85.5)	28.7 (83.7)	26.9 (80.4)	24.5 (76.1)	21.5 (70.7)	18.7 (65.7)	23.9 (75.0)
Đồng Hới	18.9 (66.0)	19.3 (66.7)	21.6 (70.9)	24.7 (76.5)	28.0 (82.4)	29.6 (85.3)	29.7 (85.5)	28.9 (84.0)	27.0 (80.6)	24.9 (76.8)	22.3 (72.1)	19.6 (67.3)	24.5 (76.1)
Huế	20.0 (68.0)	20.7 (69.3)	23.1 (73.6)	26.1 (79.0)	28.2 (82.8)	29.3 (84.7)	29.5 (85.1)	29.0 (84.2)	27.2 (81.0)	25.3 (77.5)	23.1 (73.6)	20.7 (69.3)	25.2 (77.4)
Quảng Ngãi	21.6 (70.9)	22.4 (72.3)	24.3 (75.7)	26.6 (79.9)	28.3 (82.9)	28.9 (84.0)	28.9 (84.0)	28.6 (83.5)	27.2 (81.0)	25.7 (78.3)	24.0 (75.2)	22.2 (72.0)	25.7 (78.3)
Qui Nhơn	23.2 (73.8)	24.0 (75.2)	25.5 (77.9)	27.5 (81.5)	29.1 (84.4)	29.8 (85.6)	29.9 (85.8)	29.9 (85.8)	28.5 (83.3)	26.8 (80.2)	25.4 (77.7)	23.8 (74.8)	26.9 (80.4)
Phan Thiết	24.8 (76.6)	25.4 (77.7)	26.6 (79.9)	28.1 (82.6)	28.6 (83.5)	27.8 (82.0)	27.1 (80.8)	27.0 (80.6)	27.0 (80.6)	26.9 (80.4)	26.4 (79.5)	25.5 (77.9)	26.8 (80.2)
Da Lat	15.8 (60.4)	16.9 (62.4)	18.0 (64.4)	18.8 (65.8)	19.3 (66.7)	19.0 (66.2)	18.6 (65.5)	18.5 (65.3)	18.4 (65.1)	18.1 (64.6)	17.3 (63.1)	16.2 (61.2)	17.9 (64.2)
Buôn Ma Thuột	20.9 (69.6)	22.4 (72.3)	24.5 (76.1)	26.0 (78.8)	25.6 (78.1)	24.7 (76.5)	24.2 (75.6)	24.0 (75.2)	23.8 (74.8)	23.4 (74.1)	22.3 (72.1)	21.0 (69.8)	23.6 (74.5)
Pleiku	18.8 (65.8)	20.5 (68.9)	22.6 (72.7)	24.1 (75.4)	23.8 (74.8)	22.9 (73.2)	22.3 (72.1)	22.1 (71.8)	22.2 (72.0)	21.7 (71.1)	20.5 (68.9)	19.1 (66.4)	21.7 (71.1)
Ho Chi Minh City	26.0 (78.8)	26.8 (80.2)	28.0 (82.4)	29.2 (84.6)	28.8 (83.8)	27.8 (82.0)	27.5 (81.5)	27.4 (81.3)	27.2 (81.0)	27.0 (80.6)	26.7 (80.1)	26.0 (78.8)	27.4 (81.3)
Phước Long	24.1 (75.4)	25.3 (77.5)	26.9 (80.4)	27.5 (81.5)	27.0 (80.6)	26.0 (78.8)	25.5 (77.9)	25.3 (77.5)	25.2 (77.4)	25.0 (77.0)	24.7 (76.5)	23.7 (74.7)	25.5 (77.9)
Vũng Tàu	25.0 (77.0)	25.4 (77.7)	26.7 (80.1)	28.2 (82.8)	28.5 (83.3)	27.7 (81.9)	27.1 (80.8)	27.0 (80.6)	26.9 (80.4)	26.7 (80.1)	26.4 (79.5)	25.4 (77.7)	26.7 (80.1)
Cần Thơ	25.2 (77.4)	25.9 (78.6)	27.1 (80.8)	28.3 (82.9)	27.7 (81.9)	27.0 (80.6)	26.7 (80.1)	26.6 (79.9)	26.6 (79.9)	26.7 (80.1)	26.6 (79.9)	25.4 (77.7)	26.6 (79.9)
Mỹ Tho	25.5 (77.9)	26.1 (79.0)	27.3 (81.1)	28.5 (83.3)	28.2 (82.8)	27.6 (81.7)	27.3 (81.1)	27.0 (80.6)	26.9 (80.4)	26.8 (80.2)	26.6 (79.9)	25.6 (78.1)	27.0 (80.6)
Phú Quốc	25.6 (78.1)	26.5 (79.7)	27.6 (81.7)	28.4 (83.1)	28.4 (83.1)	27.8 (82.0)	27.5 (81.5)	27.3 (81.1)	27.0 (80.6)	26.7 (80.1)	26.7 (80.1)	26.0 (78.8)	27.1 (80.8)

=== Precipitation ===
Average Precipitation in various locations in Vietnam in mm (in)
Location	Jan	Feb	Mar	Apr	May	Jun	Jul	Aug	Sept	Oct	Nov	Dec	Annual
Điện Biên Phủ	21 (0.83)	31 (1.2)	55 (2.2)	111 (4.4)	187 (7.4)	274 (10.8)	310 (12)	313 (12.3)	151 (5.9)	65 (2.6)	31 (1.2)	21 (0.83)	1,568 (61.7)
Sa Pa	63 (2.5)	81 (3.2)	106 (4.2)	213 (8.4)	346 (13.6)	410 (16)	465 (18.3)	449 (17.7)	313 (12.3)	215 (8.5)	112 (4.4)	64 (2.5)	2,836 (111.7)
Yên Bái	33 (1.3)	45 (1.8)	75 (3.0)	131 (5.2)	219 (8.6)	291 (11.5)	310 (12)	361 (14.2)	283 (11.1)	180 (7.1)	66 (2.6)	27 (1.1)	2,024 (79.7)
Cao Bằng	25 (0.98)	25 (0.98)	49 (1.9)	87 (3.4)	184 (7.2)	236 (9.3)	272 (10.7)	260 (10)	138 (5.4)	83 (3.3)	43 (1.7)	21 (0.83)	1,422 (56.0)
Hạ Long	23 (0.91)	25 (0.98)	41 (1.6)	91 (3.6)	170 (6.7)	299 (11.8)	327 (12.9)	445 (17.5)	282 (11.1)	159 (6.3)	37 (1.5)	19 (0.75)	1,918 (75.5)
Hà Giang	39 (1.5)	42 (1.7)	62 (2.4)	110 (4.3)	311 (12.2)	448 (17.6)	520 (20)	409 (16.1)	250 (9.8)	171 (6.7)	91 (3.6)	41 (1.6)	2,492 (98.1)
Hanoi	18 (0.71)	19 (0.75)	34 (1.3)	105 (4.1)	165 (6.5)	266 (10.5)	253 (10.0)	274 (10.8)	243 (9.6)	156 (6.1)	59 (2.3)	20 (0.79)	1,611 (63.4)
Tam Đảo	37 (1.5)	47 (1.9)	83 (3.3)	142 (5.6)	234 (9.2)	375 (14.8)	433 (17.0)	456 (18.0)	328 (12.9)	226 (8.9)	96 (3.8)	36 (1.4)	2,491 (98.1)
Vinh	52 (2.0)	42 (1.7)	45 (1.8)	64 (2.5)	132 (5.2)	117 (4.6)	118 (4.6)	223 (8.8)	517 (20.4)	542 (21.3)	187 (7.4)	74 (2.9)	2,113 (83.2)
Đồng Hới	57 (2.2)	44 (1.7)	42 (1.7)	55 (2.2)	112 (4.4)	86 (3.4)	74 (2.9)	160 (6.3)	463 (18.2)	671 (26.4)	349 (13.7)	127 (5.0)	2,238 (88.1)
Huế	126 (5.0)	65 (2.6)	43 (1.7)	58 (2.3)	102 (4.0)	113 (4.4)	92 (3.6)	117 (4.6)	394 (15.5)	757 (29.8)	621 (24.4)	311 (12.2)	2,798 (110.2)
Quảng Ngai	123 (4.8)	41 (1.6)	38 (1.5)	49 (1.9)	99 (3.9)	110 (4.3)	92 (3.6)	126 (5.0)	303 (11.9)	639 (25.2)	563 (22.2)	284 (11.2)	2,466 (97.1)
Qui Nhơn	64 (2.5)	28 (1.1)	24 (0.94)	31 (1.2)	84 (3.3)	64 (2.5)	38 (1.5)	62 (2.4)	277 (10.9)	549 (21.6)	437 (17.2)	199 (7.8)	1,807 (71.1)
Phan Thiết	1 (0.039)	0 (0)	6 (0.24)	30 (1.2)	136 (5.4)	145 (5.7)	165 (6.5)	164 (6.5)	192 (7.6)	155 (6.1)	58 (2.3)	20 (0.79)	1,072 (42.2)
Da Lat	8 (0.31)	21 (0.83)	61 (2.4)	173 (6.8)	208 (8.2)	207 (8.1)	236 (9.3)	234 (9.2)	279 (11.0)	248 (9.8)	90 (3.5)	36 (1.4)	1,802 (70.9)
Buôn Ma Thuột	5 (0.20)	5 (0.20)	19 (0.75)	86 (3.4)	237 (9.3)	248 (9.8)	255 (10.0)	310 (12)	288 (11.3)	222 (8.7)	96 (3.8)	25 (0.98)	1,796 (70.7)
Pleiku	3 (0.12)	6 (0.24)	22 (0.87)	93 (3.7)	245 (9.6)	344 (13.5)	390 (15)	476 (18.7)	362 (14.3)	189 (7.4)	64 (2.5)	11 (0.43)	2,206 (86.9)
Ho Chi Minh City	12 (0.47)	4 (0.16)	13 (0.51)	51 (2.0)	207 (8.1)	294 (11.6)	307 (12.1)	281 (11.1)	305 (12.0)	291 (11.5)	135 (5.3)	28 (1.1)	1,926 (75.8)
Phước Long	14 (0.55)	16 (0.63)	41 (1.6)	121 (4.8)	290 (11)	382 (15.0)	401 (15.8)	462 (18.2)	468 (18.4)	322 (12.7)	119 (4.7)	31 (1.2)	2,665 (104.9)
Vũng Tàu	2 (0.079)	0 (0)	5 (0.20)	28 (1.1)	191 (7.5)	216 (8.5)	234 (9.2)	212 (8.3)	233 (9.2)	236 (9.3)	66 (2.6)	14 (0.55)	1,437 (56.6)
Cần Thơ	9 (0.35)	2 (0.079)	8 (0.31)	40 (1.6)	177 (7.0)	218 (8.6)	228 (9.0)	240 (9.4)	261 (10.3)	321 (12.6)	133 (5.2)	38 (1.5)	1,674 (65.9)
Mỹ Tho	5 (0.20)	1 (0.039)	6 (0.24)	42 (1.7)	145 (5.7)	198 (7.8)	177 (7.0)	188 (7.4)	231 (9.1)	262 (10.3)	98 (3.9)	32 (1.3)	1,384 (54.5)
Phú Quốc	34 (1.3)	29 (1.1)	54 (2.1)	149 (5.9)	298 (11.7)	413 (16.3)	418 (16.5)	546 (21.5)	473 (18.6)	387 (15.2)	169 (6.7)	59 (2.3)	3,029 (119.3)

=== Overall averages ===
Climate data for Vietnam (country–wide averages) 1961–1990
Month	Jan	Feb	Mar	Apr	May	Jun	Jul	Aug	Sep	Oct	Nov	Dec	Year
Mean daily maximum °C (°F)	23.8 (74.8)	24.8 (76.6)	27.8 (82.0)	29.6 (85.3)	31.1 (88.0)	31.0 (87.8)	30.9 (87.6)	30.7 (87.3)	29.9 (85.8)	28.5 (83.3)	26.5 (79.7)	24.8 (76.6)	28.3 (82.9)
Daily mean °C (°F)	19.9 (67.8)	21.0 (69.8)	22.5 (72.5)	25.6 (78.1)	27.1 (80.8)	27.3 (81.1)	27.4 (81.3)	27.1 (80.8)	26.3 (79.3)	24.9 (76.8)	22.9 (73.2)	20.8 (69.4)	24.4 (75.9)
Mean daily minimum °C (°F)	16.1 (61.0)	17.2 (63.0)	17.3 (63.1)	21.6 (70.9)	23.2 (73.8)	23.7 (74.7)	23.9 (75.0)	23.5 (74.3)	22.8 (73.0)	21.3 (70.3)	19.3 (66.7)	16.9 (62.4)	20.6 (69.1)
Average precipitation mm (inches)	38 (1.5)	27 (1.1)	38 (1.5)	74 (2.9)	171 (6.7)	227 (8.9)	246 (9.7)	255 (10.0)	265 (10.4)	234 (9.2)	168 (6.6)	77 (3.0)	1,821 (71.7)
Average precipitation days	7.1	6.9	8.1	10.4	15.4	17.7	19.1	20.6	18.3	15.2	10.2	7.3	156.4
Source: Climate Research Unit

== Natural disasters ==
Climate extremes include heat waves, cold surges and frosts, floods, droughts, and severe storms.

== See also ==
- Geography of Vietnam
- Environmental issues in Vietnam

== Books ==
- Nguyen Danh Thao; Hiroshi Takagi; Miguel Esteban (2014). "Chapter 8: Climate Change in the Coastal Regions of Vietnam". In Thanh, Ngo-Duc (ed.). Coastal Disasters and Climate Change in Vietnam: Engineering and Planning Perspectives. Elsevier. pp. 175–198. doi:10.1016/B978-0-12-800007-6.00019-8. ISBN 978-0-12-800007-6. Archived from the original on 26 February 2022.
