= Northern Vietnam =

Geographic region of Vietnam

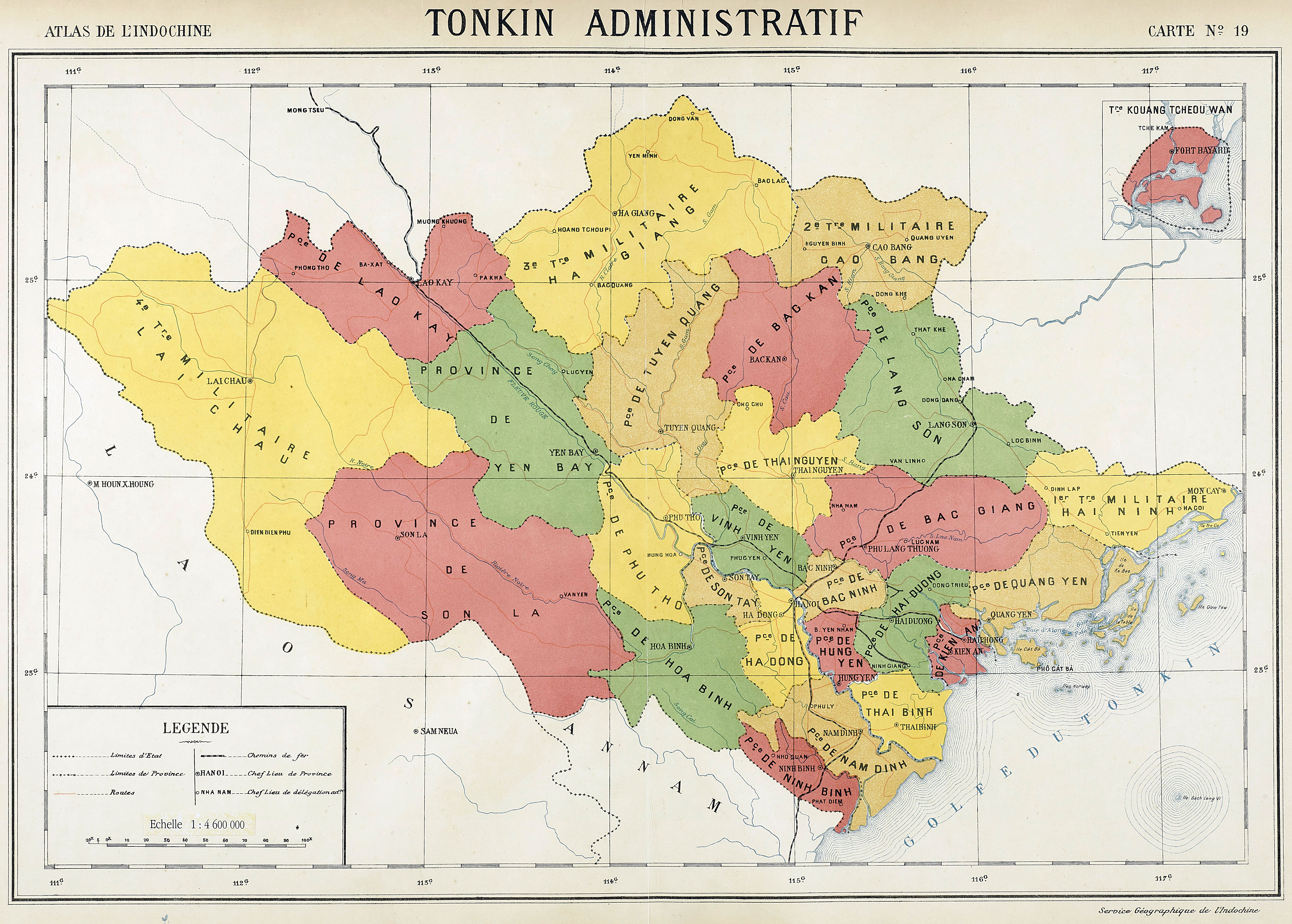
Map of Northern Vietnam, 1920

Geographic sub-regions of Vietnam

Northern Vietnam (Vietnamese: Bắc Bộ) is one of three geographical regions in Vietnam. It consists of three sub-regions: the Northwest (vùng Tây Bắc), the Northeast (vùng Đông Bắc), and the Red River Delta (Đồng bằng sông Hồng). Unlike tropical Southern Vietnam, Northern Vietnam has a subtropical climate.

The region was historically referred to by various names in Vietnamese: Bắc Kỳ during the Nguyễn dynasty, Bắc Bộ from 1945 to the present (encompassing the Empire of Vietnam and the Democratic Republic of Vietnam), and Bắc Phần, sometimes Bắc Việt, during the State of Vietnam.

It has a total area of about 109,942.9 km^{2}. The region's largest city, Hanoi, serves as the country's capital. Among the three geographical regions, the oldest is Northern Vietnam. Vietnamese culture originated in the Red River Delta and the Kinh Vietnamese eventually spread south into the Mekong Delta.

== Administration ==
Northern Vietnam includes three administrative regions, which in turn comprise 25 First Tier units.

Northern Vietnam
Administrative Region	First Tier Administrative Units	Area (km^{2})	Population (2022)	Population Density (people/ km^{2})	Notes
Northeast (Đông Bắc Bộ)	Bắc Giang; Bắc Kạn; Cao Bằng; Hà Giang; Lạng Sơn; Phú Thọ; Quảng Ninh; Thái Nguyên; Tuyên Quang	50,826.38	9,474,710	186.41	contains most of the mountainous provinces that lie to north of the highly populated Red River lowlands. Four of them are along Vietnam's border with China.
Northwest (Tây Bắc Bộ)	Điện Biên; Hòa Bình; Lai Châu; Lào Cai; Sơn La; Yên Bái	50,565.71	4,911,370	97.13	contains inland provinces in the west of Vietnam's northern part. Three of them are along Vietnam's border with Laos, and two border China (Dien Bien borders both China and Laos).
Red River Delta (Đồng Bằng Sông Hồng)	Bắc Ninh ^{†} Hà Nam; Hà Nội ^{†} Hải Dương; Hải Phòng ^{†} Hưng Yên; Nam Định; Ninh Bình; Thái Bình; Vĩnh Phúc	15,070.70	22,091,250	1,465.84	contains the small but populous provinces along the mouth of the Red River. The Red River Delta has the smallest area but highest population and population density of all regions. It is also the only region without any land borders with neighboring countries.

^† Municipality (thành phố trực thuộc trung ương)

Of all 25 First Tier units, two are municipalities and 23 are provinces.

== See also ==
- Northern, Central and Southern Vietnam
- Regions of Vietnam
- Tonkin – a historical exonym for North Vietnam
