= Áo bà ba =

Traditional Vietnamese clothing

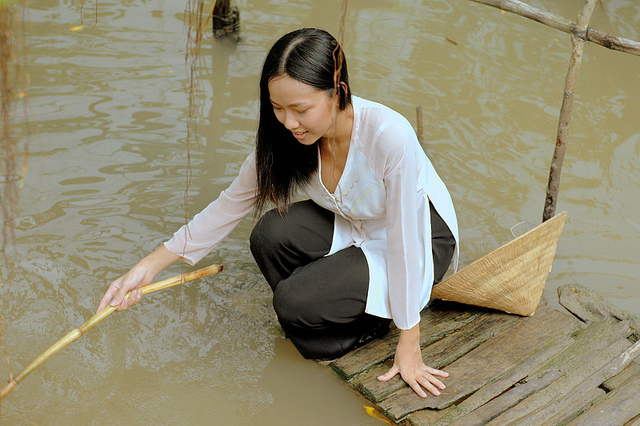
Mekong Delta woman with áo bà ba

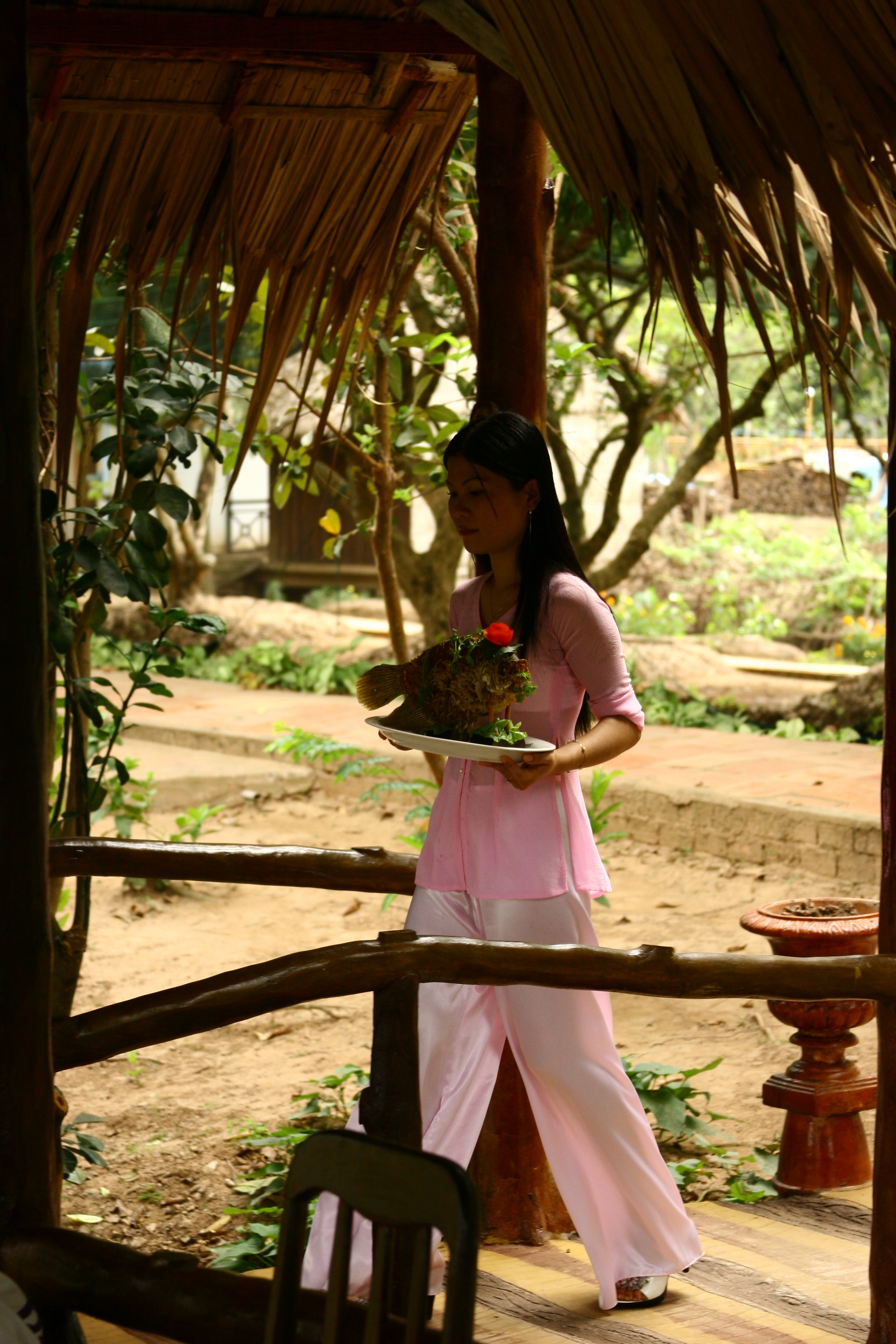
A woman in áo bà ba

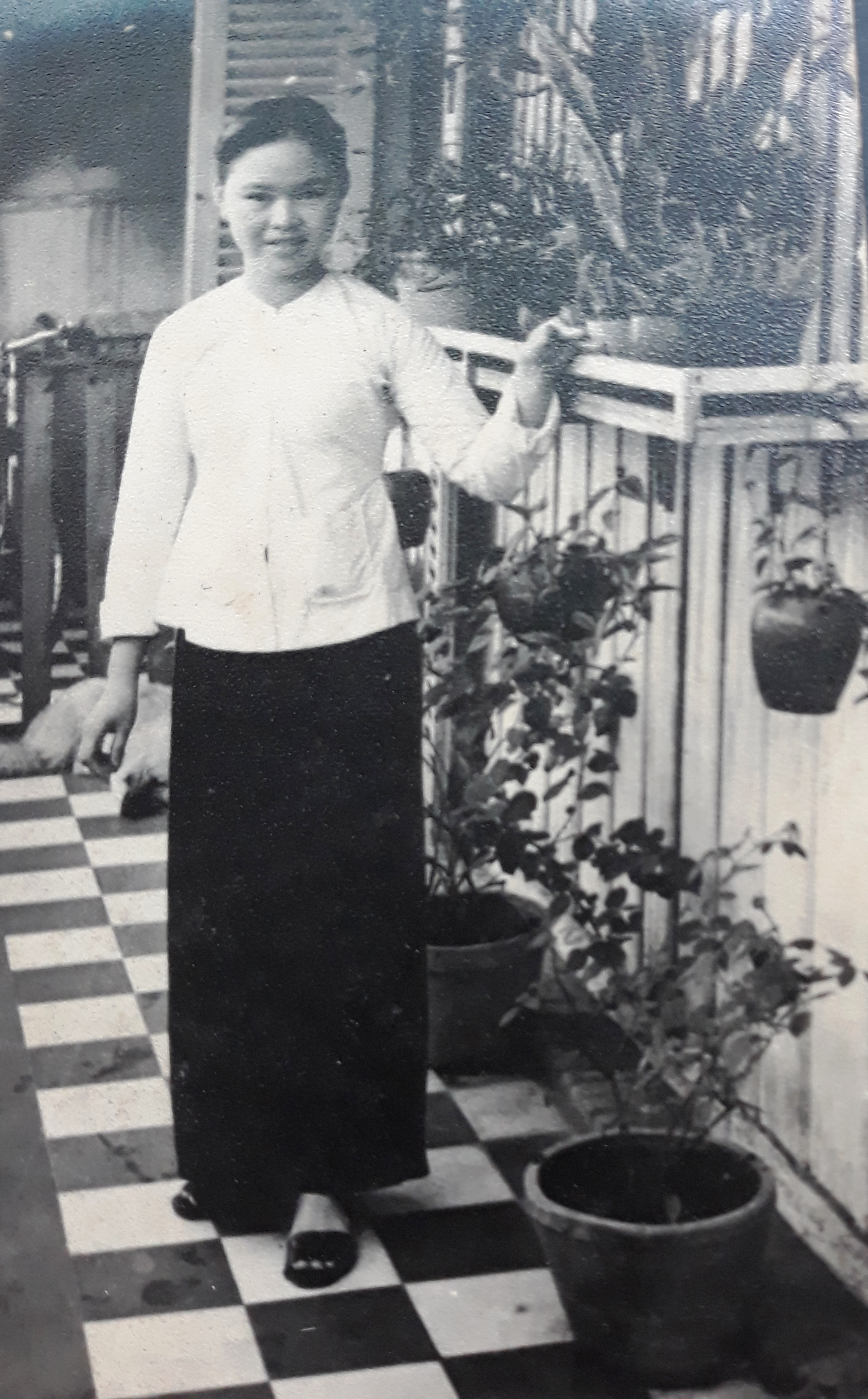
Saigonese girl wearing an original áo bà ba and wooden shoes in 1955.

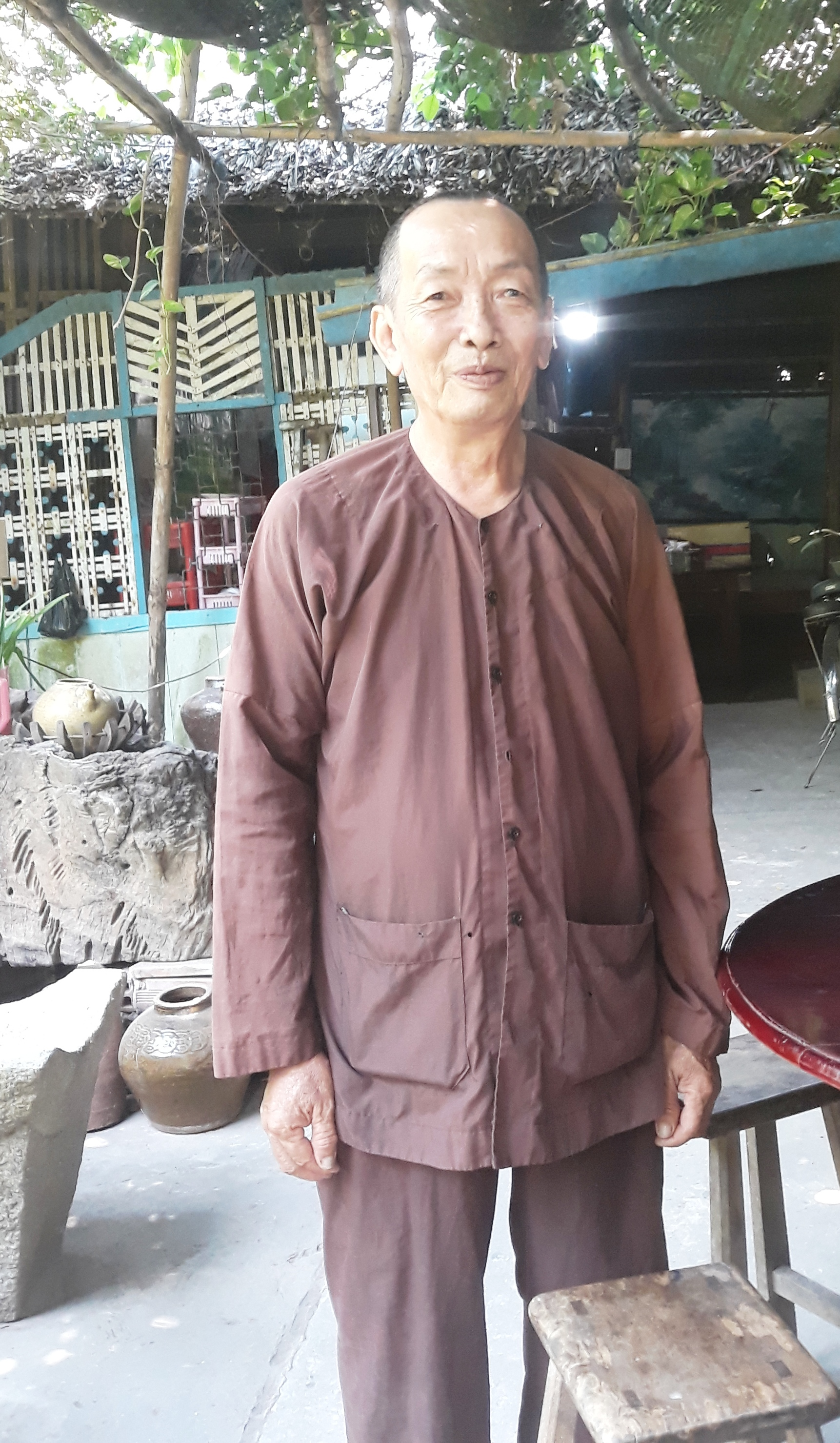
Elderly man with his traditional áo bà ba in the Mekong Delta.

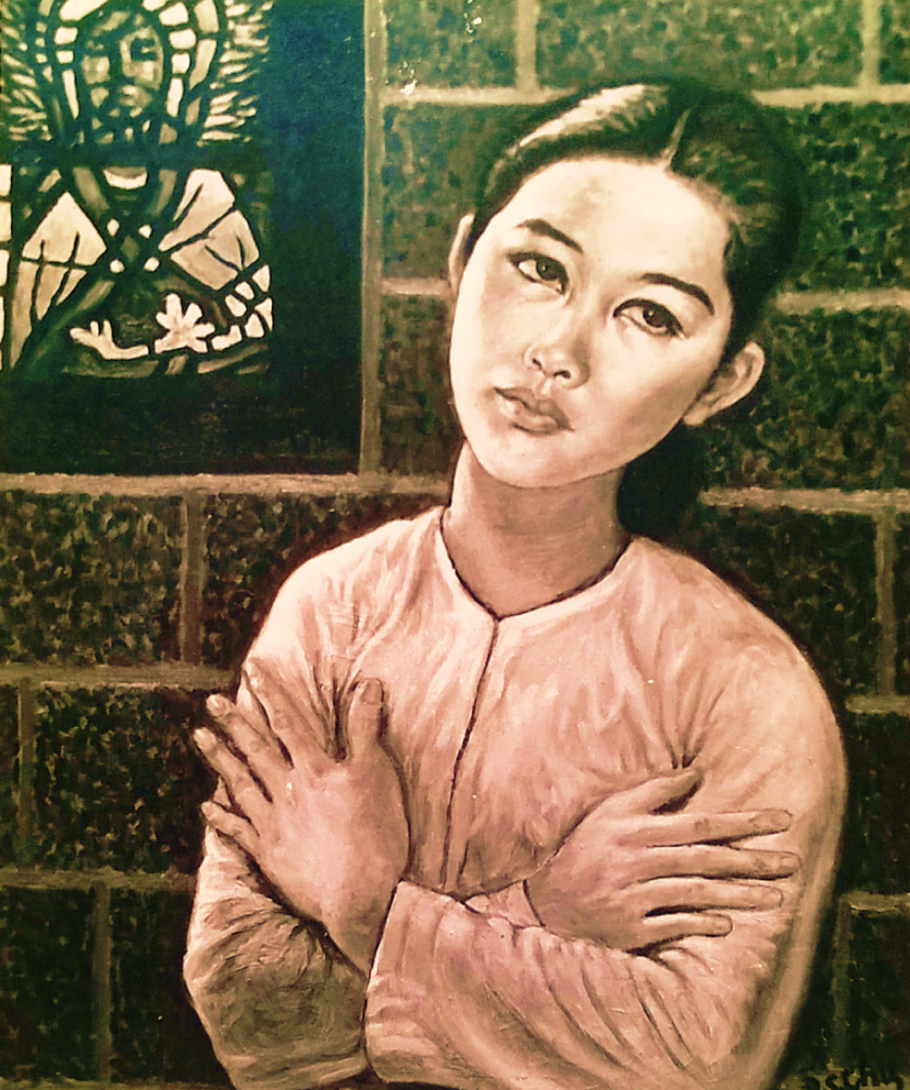
Painting of young lady in áo bà ba by Đào Sĩ Chu.

Áo bà ba (Vietnamese: [ʔǎːw ɓâː ɓaː], translates to "Grandma's shirt") is a traditional southern Vietnamese garment. The top part that covers the torso is called the áo ("shirt" in English). It is mostly associated with rural southern Vietnam, especially in the Mekong Delta. Often worn as a top and bottom set, the áo bà ba is typically a long-sleeved, button-down silk shirt with a scooped neck, paired with silk pants. The shirt is long and split at the waist sides, forming two flaps, and customarily features two pockets.

To protect and honor the time-honored traditions of Vietnam, Hau Giang Province held the Áo Bà Ba Festival in 2023.

== Etymology ==
The term áo bà ba might be translated as "the shirt of madam" (aunt-like/grandmother figure) Ba (a woman who is a second-born in the South, of her parents).

According to writer Sơn Nam, the áo bà ba shirt first appeared during the 19th century. The name originated from the dress of the Baba Nyonya, ethnic Chinese from Penang, Malaysia.

== Historical roots and design ==
While the three-flap tunic has tribal and folk (long-lived, extended family communities in the countryside) roots, the áo bà ba most likely did not formalize as a distinctive garment of its own until after the appearance of the tunic. It was slightly shorter than the tunic and made of lighter fabric. The áo bà ba's widespread appearance was mainly due to the broadening knowledge of Vietnamese culture. The garment arrived when the lower class became an economic entity as they were elsewhere worldwide in the latter half of the 1800s.

This is due to the progression of materials used, designs, and their appearance in folk art. The three-flap tunic is more likely to be made of comparatively coarser material such as linen cotton and animal material such as wool in the colder part of the country. The áo bà ba, on the other hand, was invariably made of silk or, until more modern synthetic fibers such as polyester, silk-like material. The áo bà ba may have a miniature accent embroidery but would likely never be of jacquard weaving. Jacquard weaving was associated with the upper class, the aristocracy, and Chinese tradition, for its ability to inlay intricate designs, motifs, and metallic colors.

It is not clear when either the name of the garment or its distinctive presence arose among the cultures living in the region in the present country of Vietnam. Folk tradition suggests a definite Chinese influence due to China's 1,000-plus years of dominance over peoples to the south. Since the dawn of photography, the áo bà ba, like most other garments identifiable of mainland Southeast Asia—Cambodia, Laos, Burma—has maintained its basic shape for a century and a half into present times. Chinese dress line might have influenced the traditional Vietnamese costume. Except, the áo bà ba does not have an upright Mandarin collar but an open neck and is not closed at the shoulder but is either a pull-top or has buttons along the front. Another key difference to distinguish the áo bà ba as a particularly Vietnamese variation or innovation, setting it apart from the Chinese silhouette with a casual glance, is the buttons would not be knotted cords or frog (fastening) but plain and most often round like on Western garments.

As the Vietnamese people, a population rather than a political mass, were beginning to associate with each other as a people apart and distinct from the Chinese, through the course of the Indochina Wars but also decades earlier throughout the worldwide turmoil of World War I and its aftermath, the áo bà ba grew in increased prominence through sheer ubiquity and economic necessity. Usually consisting of a solid color top and bottom, though not necessarily in the same color, the simplicity and versatility of the áo bà ba outlasted many other traditional garments. It is the garment of the countryside, of the working people, of the lower class and the common people. As with denim jeans in the West, the áo bà ba's no-frills design worn by the simple folk outlasted many other trends and is considered a classic.

The áo bà ba is regarded as the two-piece ensemble upon which the popularised áo dài is derived. The áo dài reincorporated Chinese designs with a Vietnamese flair, while the áo bà ba has long come into its own as a very Vietnamese garment. The áo dài gained a resurgence in popularity during and after the Vietnam War for its "feminisation" of warfare and overall universal appeal, while the áo bà ba, seen in horrific images linked with death and warfare, gained a misunderstood reputation. The áo bà ba is Vietnamese in modern times and has regained respect for its close relationship with the culture and civilization of Vietnam rather than a war.

== Wear and appearance ==
For females, the optional princess seams (two vertical seams in the front, optional diagonal ones from under the arms, up to the lower breast) is likely a more modern refinement following similar Western trends after World War II—after the Flapper Girl period. From the historical record through photographs, the use of buttons, which became the standard, arrived at about the same time or not long after buttons were more cheaply available and widespread in materials other than mother of pearl, cuttlebone, ivory, and the like.

Metal sew-on snap buttons are still preferred as a cost-effective middle ground between traditionally more expensive natural materials and cheaper modern plastics and polymers.

While the áo bà ba is still traditionally considered a long-sleeve garment, it was always perfectly normal to roll them up for work, for craftwork and skilled labor, for child caring, and certainly for cooking and household chores. In the deep south (south of Saigon or Ho Chi Minh City), it was possible to find women wearing short-sleeve variations due to the sub-tropical climate well into the 1950s before the arrival of American troops.

Through the Vietnam War, particularly through the eye of American media and cameras, Vietnamese people were portrayed to favor wearing "black pajamas" all day. The black part is atypical of the áo bà ba's history, as field workers will often wear darker color to hide the grime, as part of the nature of their work.

The bottom are simple trousers typically of an elastic band in later times, more traditionally a buttoned waistband or pull-string waistband. The trunks are loose and flowing with a small amount of flaring but can also be cut straight.

Great care is taken to make a hand-made ensemble of one's own tailoring. Contrary to the notion that the ensemble is simply pajamas as though it were prêt-à-porter bought off the rack, part of a family's pride is the ability to provide everyone with individualized sets suited to each family member's personality and tastes. It is made of delicate silk and made with care and attention, being worn daily rather than merely on special occasions.

Sets are often given as gifts for Tết (New Year's). Parents glow with pride to know their young ones, from the time their children can walk and talk, can go out in public in a smart ensemble. Wearing the ensemble holds the cultural sense that one has respect for others and for oneself, is friendly and personable. It is not a consumer garment but for living with others under the same climate. Unlike Western imports, the áo bà ba signifies "I know who I am, a person who cares." Wearing the ensemble signifies one is not lazy, a slouch, or discourteous; it shows one has manners and approachable.

== Current status ==
Áo bà ba as men's wear has declined with increased urbanization and exposure to more industrialized nations, the Vietnamese men are now more inclined to wear westernized clothing such as T-shirt and slacks due to the volume and availability of the clothes. Vietnamese women in áo bà ba are still romanticized in art and literature, most likely due to the delicacy of the fabric.

The rehabilitation of the áo bà ba as a classic dress, since about the turn of the century and the rise of mass electronic communication, places it back to its heritage of having been the dominant daily dress of the countryside. Today, it would be incorrect to refer to it as "pajamas," and it would be unacceptable to refer to it as a "costume", just as it would be incorrect to say that a business suit is a costume. It is the dress of a way of life and is not considered "fashion" in the ordinary sense.

The garment's simplicity and versatility has contributed to its popularity, as it is used by an overwhelming amount of the population, whether in rural or urban areas today. It can be worn while laboring or lounging, fashionable quarter-sleeve or traditional long-sleeve. Modern versions come in an endless array of different designs, colors, and embroidery. It is practical, comfortable, and the elemental design is well suited for Vietnam's climate. The áo bà ba has transitioned well into modern Vietnamese fashion and continues to hold a natural presence in almost every aspect of Vietnamese life, culture, fashion, and the arts.

== See also ==
- Áo dài
- Vietnamese clothing
