= Breast binding =

Flattening breasts with undergarments

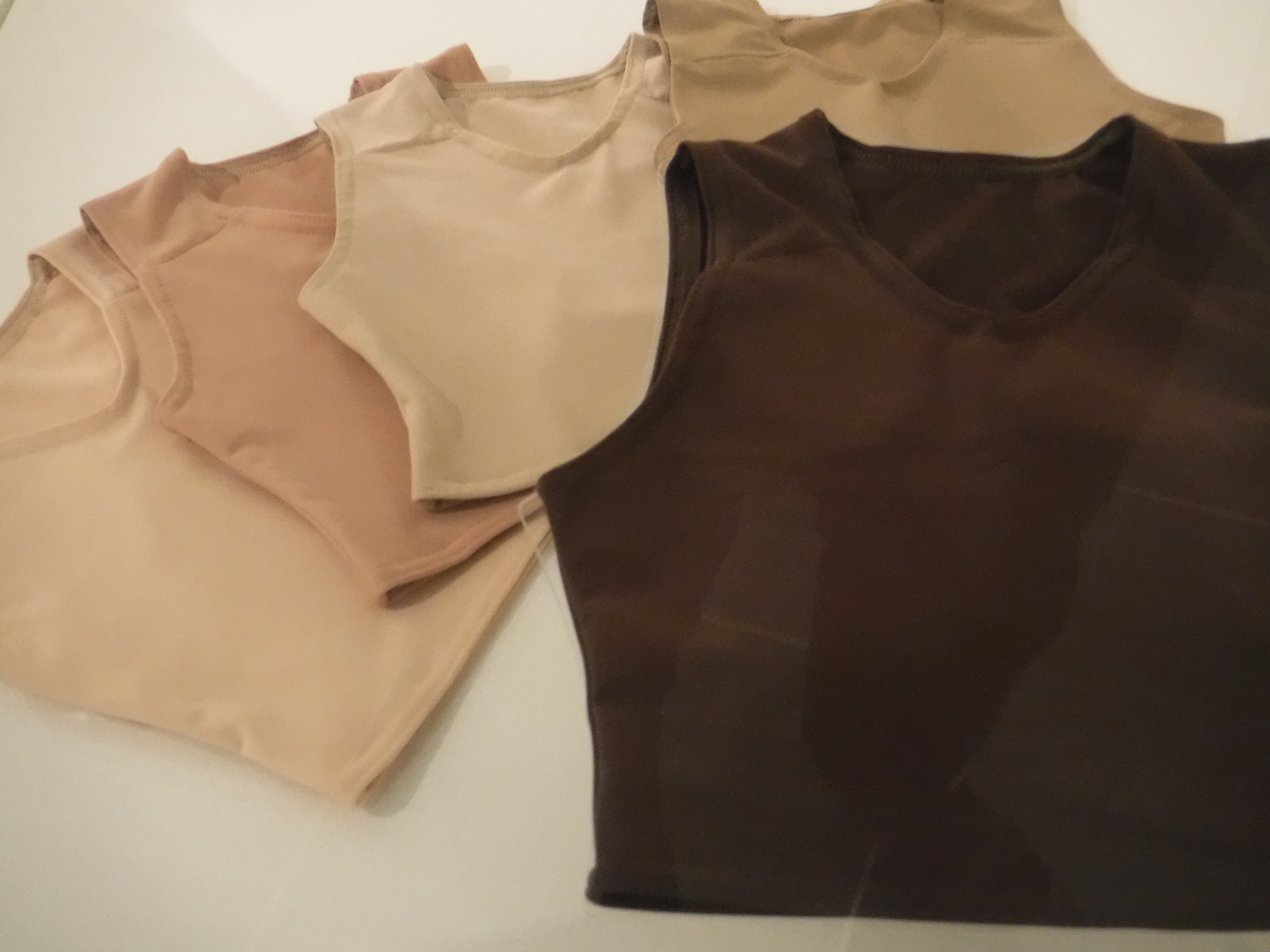
Binders on display at a Science History Institute exhibit dedicated to stretch garments

Breast binding, also known as chest binding, is the practice of flattening and hiding of breasts using constrictive materials or specialized undergarments. From Chinese moxiong and dudou undergarments, Korean hanbok wraps, and Japanese obi and sarashi to Western corsets, Catholic habits, and 1920s flapper fashion, it has been used historically for modesty, esthetics, or punishment in a variety of cultures.

Common modern uses include post-surgical recovery, lactation suppression, athletic support, costuming, and gender-affirming care. While cisgender men with gynecomastia may bind to reduce chest prominence, transmasculine and non-binary individuals frequently use binding to alleviate gender dysphoria and induce gender euphoria—often before or instead of top surgery.

Individuals flatten their chests using commercial binders, high-compression sports bras, athletic tape, or layered clothing. Some also use household materials like elastic bandages, duct tape, or plastic wrap, though these carry significant health risks. Prolonged or improper compression often results in musculoskeletal pain, shortness of breath, skin irritation, and—in severe cases—tissue damage, rib fractures, or reduced elasticity that affects future mastectomy outcomes, even though binding offers significant psychological and social benefits.

== History ==
Breast binding has been used in many historical contexts. Different time periods of history have had differing viewpoints on the female form, including the widespread use of corsets throughout western European history up to the Victorian era.

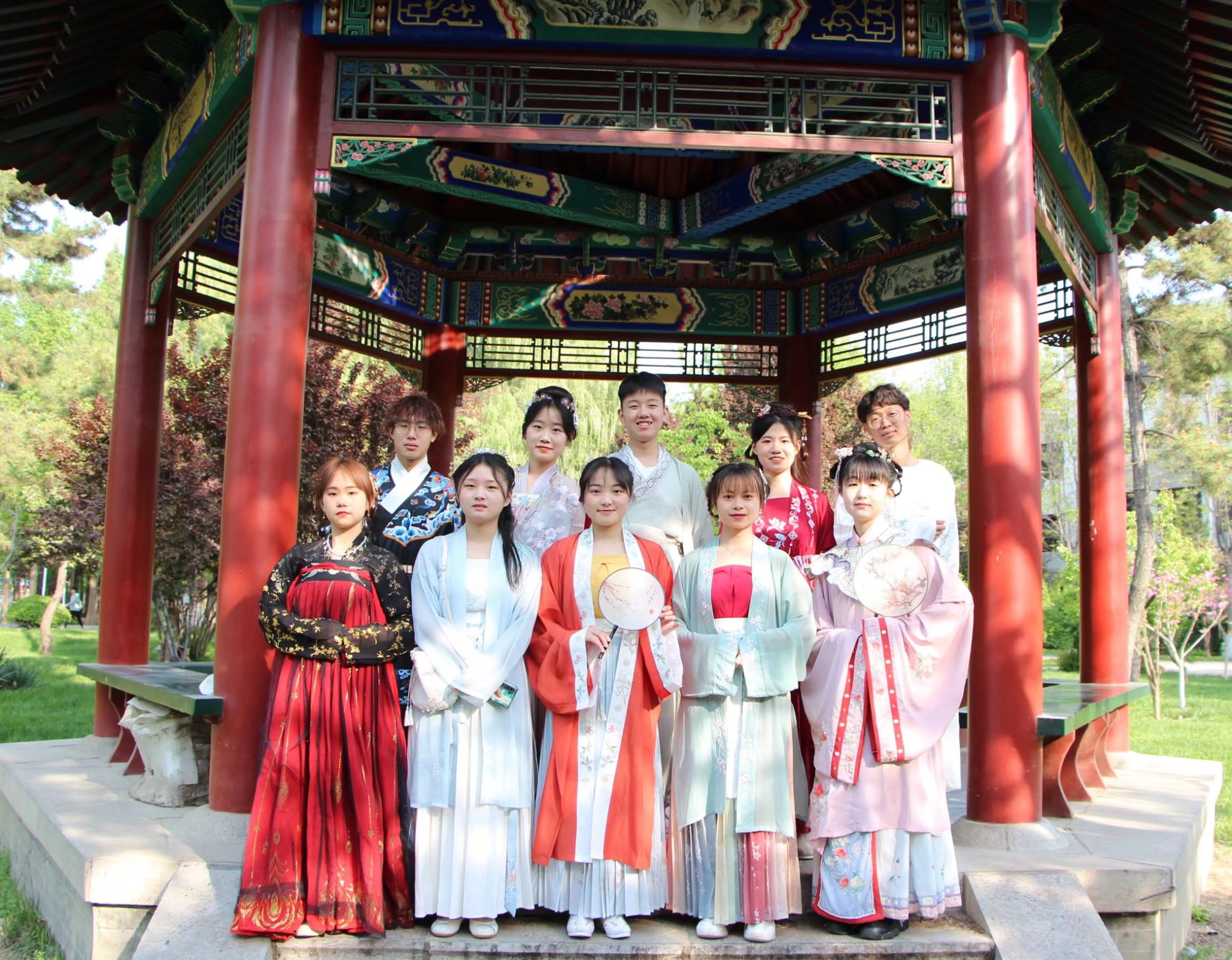
A group of women in Chinese traditional dress. The three women at the bottom center are wearing a moxiong.

During the era of China's imperial dynasties, revealing the curves of a woman's breast was considered lewd and breasts were often bound with a moxiong or a dudou. The use of the garment was particularly popular during the Tang and Song dynasties. Breast binding became an exclusive aesthetic practice for women continuing until the 1930s, with more prevalence among upper-class women. The long-standing custom resulted from a culture that "believed large breasts were symbols of lasciviousness."

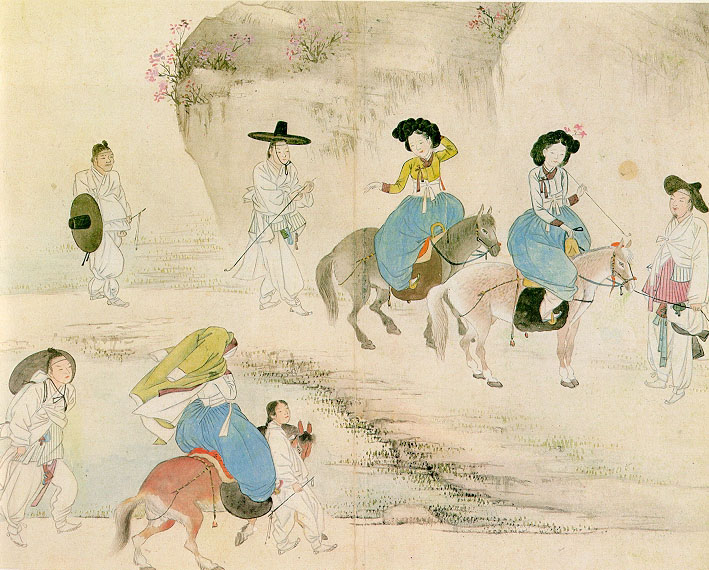
Painting of a woman wearing a traditional hanbok, by Sin Yunbok, 19th century

Korean women wearing the traditional hanbok concealed the female body by binding their breasts tightly with a cloth band.

In Japan, the traditional kimono flattens the appearance of the breasts, with breasts bound and flattened with an obi, and a datemaki belt wrapped around the torso from the chest to the waist. A sarashi is used by Japanese women to flatten their breasts.

In Africa, adolescent Wodaabe girls had their breasts tightly bound to induce sagging, minimize sexual desirability, and improve their ability to breastfeed. In cultures where the breasts of pubescent girls are ironed to suppress their development, wealthier classes often choose to use an elastic belt to compress and flatten the breasts.

Until the early 20th century, many Catholic nuns bound their breasts under their habit to deflect the attention of male clergy and diminish sexual desire in men.

Breast binding was one of the punishments inflicted upon the women inmates confined in Ireland's Magdalene asylums.

Post-WWI women office workers modified their physique with bound breasts to reduce and conceal the female form, thereby minimizing sexual curiosity from males.

In the 1920s, a flat-chested silhouette became the ideal look among women, with breasts bound against the chest wall with binders. To present a boyish form, flappers bound their breasts.

Wearing a corset was one way that the size of breasts could be reduced.

== Motivation ==
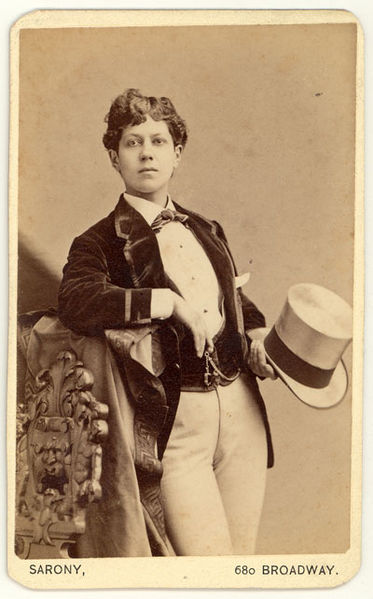
Male impersonator Ella Wesner. Impersonators and drag kings may bind their breasts as a characteristic of their costume.

There are many reasons for binding breasts:

- For accelerated recovery by reducing movement after an injury or surgery.
- For lactation suppression.
- For concealment of breasts or breast development.
- For beauty and aesthetics.
- For male impersonation, cosplay, crossplay, and other forms of costuming.
- For a masculine clothed appearance, to assist with passing as male.
- For affirming gender identity and alleviating gender dysphoria by creating a masculine silhouette.
- For increased breast support during physical exercise or competition.
- For feeling safer in public or at work.

Transgender and gender-nonconforming people, especially transgender men and non-binary people, may choose to bind to alleviate chest dysphoria and create gender euphoria. Some people bind as an alternative or precursor to chest masculinization surgery. Trans people usually have multiple reasons for choosing to bind.

Women who have developed larger breasts from hormone replacement therapy or breast augmentation surgery may choose to bind.

Some adolescents begin to bind their breasts as they enter puberty. For youth who have been designated female at birth, breast tissue development during puberty can cause distress or discomfort in an experience called chest dysphoria. This is a primary cause of gender dysphoria for transmasculine and gender-nonconforming people. Some people associate binding with body dissatisfaction or body dysmorphic disorder.

== Transmasculine and non-binary people ==
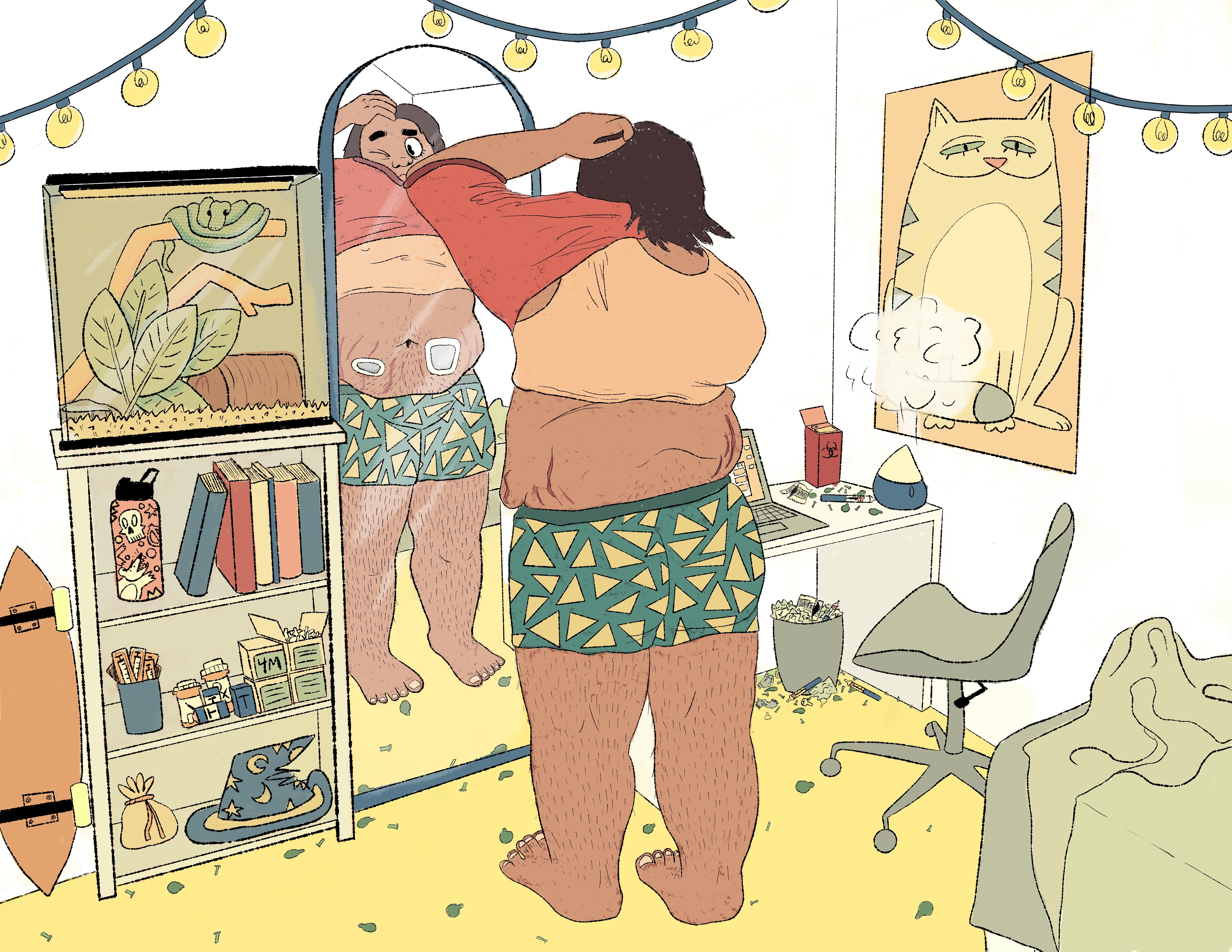
Drawing of a Filipino transmasculine person wearing a binder and dressing in front of the mirror

Transgender men and non-binary people may bind their breasts as an alternative to or while waiting for top surgery. The appearance of a flat chest may minimize gender dysphoria and cause gender euphoria.

Binding is a very common practice for transmasculine people. In a 2015 study of transmasculine Australians, 87% of respondents had practiced chest binding. Many treat binding as an interim measure until they can get top surgery. In a 2024 survey of intersex and designated female at birth people who bind, most respondents identified as transgender or masculine, and about one third as genderqueer or agender. 86% of respondents had not had a chest reduction or reconstruction surgery, and two in three were planning on getting one someday. Half of the respondents would bind every day, and most had bound for at least a year.

In a 2020 study of trans and non-binary American adults who bind, 92% felt the binder let them connect with or express their gender identity. Gender affirmation and expression was a very common reason to bind: 41% felt binding alleviated gender dysphoria, 30% said binding expressed their gender identity better, and 31% felt binding sent a visual signal that coded them as masculine. A majority said they also did it for how it made them feel, whether it was more comfortable, safe, confident, or attractive. Half of respondents were also motivated by aesthetic reasons like fitting into menswear.

The 2020 study on trans and non-binary people found that many both loved and hated the practice. 28% said they felt extreme happiness from binding, and 30% felt emotionally comforted by it, but 25% felt upset or anxious. Only 8% said they felt physically comfortable in the binder, and 26% were uncomfortable and 23% in pain.

In a 2020 youth study of intersex and designated female at birth Americans (age 13-24) who experienced chest dysphoria but had not had chest surgery, 89% of respondents had practiced chest binding at some point. Of the youth who bind, 58% did so every day, and 61% would bind for 8–16 hours at a time. A majority of the youth who bind had done so for a few years, with a third trying it for less than a year. 95% of youth who bind had felt physical effects from binding, mostly back pain, shortness of breath, overheating, and bad posture. However, almost everyone who experienced side-effects said that they continued to bind, whether for feeling comfort in public, having a masculine-appearing chest, or for staying safe in public.

For the youth who had never tried binding, 95% wanted to, and 70% wanted chest surgery later. Two thirds of the youth who had not practiced binding cited their parents as the reason, although many said that health concerns, large chest size, and lack of access were reasons they had not tried. Similarly, when youth who had tried binding were not able to, it was often due to unsupportive parents, lack of access, or concerns over physical impacts.

Many people who bind for gender-affirming purposes are unwilling to seek medical attention due to a perceived lack of knowledge from healthcare professionals and continue binding since they believe the benefits outweigh the risks. In case of health concerns, they tend to seek help from healthcare professionals they perceive as trans-friendly and who will not stigmatize their binding practice.

== Gynecomastia ==
Cisgender men afflicted with gynecomastia may find cause to bind as a means to control the appearance of breasts, during the wait before surgery or as an alternative to surgery. Some apparel companies make compression shirts for cisgender men that provide the same result as a breast binder.

== Methods ==
People use many different techniques to bind, including premade garments (whether designed for binding or not) and DIY methods.

=== Binders ===
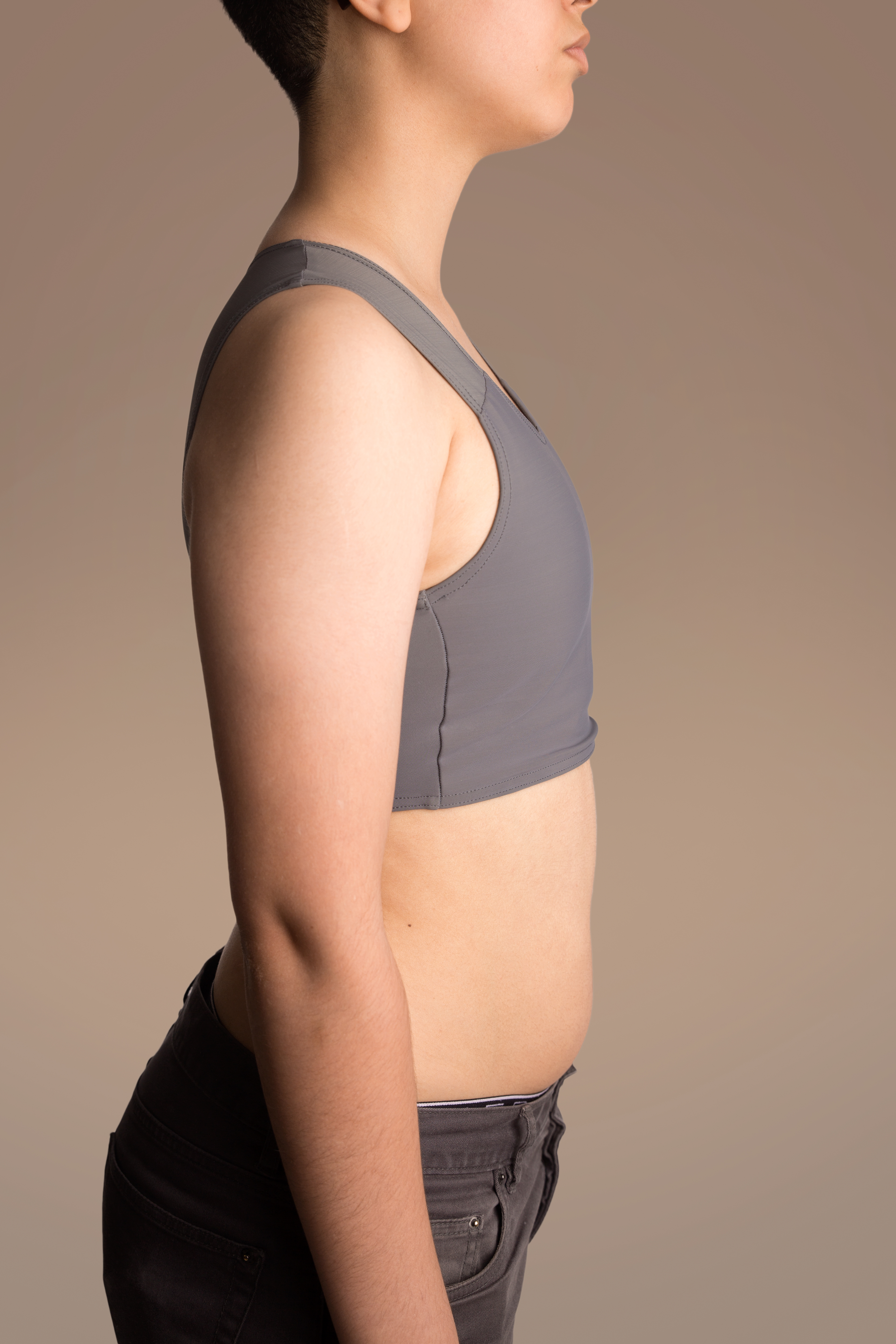
Trans man wearing a binder

Modern binders or binding bras are purpose-built undergarments designed to compress a chest. They are often made of spandex or other synthetic fibre like nylon. These can be more expensive than other breast-binding options and have not always been widely available, but well-made online binders could be bought for up to $30 from a variety of companies in a variety of styles as of 2024. Binders are available online and in retail stores. A few organizations offer free new and used binders. Point of Pride, a nonprofit that donates binders to adults who need assistance getting them, stated in 2026 that they received an average of 40 requests for binders each day.

Binders come in a variety of styles. Some are designed to be wrapped, others are shaped like undershirts, and some similar to sports bras. They come in different lengths, with some ending midway down the torso and others extending through the stomach. Some are designed as a single piece, while others can open with zippers, velcro, or clasps. For one-piece styles, some are designed to be stepped into and pulled up, while others can be pulled on like a t-shirt. Different binder styles fit better for different people, and can also cause different chest silhouettes.

Commercially-made binders are considered by community organizations to be the safest option for binding. However, one study found them to be one of the more risky methods, and it was inconclusive whether it is the type of binder, overly tight binders, or their usage style that causes physical health concerns. Commercially-sold binders can be used unsafely: incorrect sizing can cause injury, especially when a binder is too small. Additionally, many cheaper binders are sold with uncomfortable designs or incorrect sizing guidelines. Binders can cause safety issues when they feel uncomfortable, cause dizziness, or make it hard to breathe. Some binders are the wrong shape or size to be used safely for a given person. Binders are not designed to be worn for more than 8 hours a day, or during exercise.

Recommended care for binders includes hand washing or using a delicates bag in a machine if needed, and hanging to air dry.

=== Other garments ===
There are some kinds of tape designed specifically for chest binding, which do not compress ribs or lungs, and can be worn safely for 3 to 5 days without removal. Considerations were made for everyday wear, like swimming, showering, or sweating.

Some people use wet suits or unpadded sports bras in place of purpose-made binders. One study found that using sports bras, layered sports bras, and athletic compression garments were the least likely binding methods to cause physical health issues.

=== DIY methods ===
People sometimes make their own homemade binding solutions, often via wrapping available materials around their chest. Common materials include bandages, tape, and plastic wrap. This is regarded as an often accessible technique, but one that carriers high risks of physical health issues.

Elastic bandages are considered unsafe to use. Ace bandages are commonly associated with binding because media portrayals of trans men frequently showcase the use of these bandages as a DIY binding mechanism. However, these bandages are too constricting to use safely because they are designed to immobilize what they're wrapped around. This can cause health issues especially during physical activity. Duct tape has also been used to bind breasts, but it is dangerous and should be avoided. It is safer to use a binder from a reputable company or a high impact sports bra. Duct tape causes problems due to its lack of breathability, and upon removal it can hurt or tear skin.

People sometimes use available household objects to bind, especially when they are youth whose parents are preventing them from getting a commercial binder. In one study, documented materials included plastic wrap, tarps, and pantyhose. New materials are potentially harmful, and the study's authors suggest that healthcare providers should provide a more active role in providing patients with commercial binders instead.

Tops layered from tight-fitting to loose can also be used to hide breasts.

== Health effects ==
Binding presents physical health risks while also often providing mental health and quality of life benefits. Almost everyone who engages in binding experiences some negative physical effect. Many of those who bind are concerned about the physical health risks of binding but say that the positive effects outweigh the negative.

Binding is associated with strong mental health, identity affirmation, and safety benefits. For instance, in one 2024 survey of intersex and female assigned at birth people who bind, binding resulted in lower anxiety, dysphoria, and suicidality. Many reported increased self-esteem, confidence, mood, and public safety.

=== Complications ===
Breast binding creates a number of health risks, including difficulty breathing, backache, skin rashes, and deformity of the ribs. In the 2024 study on binding's health effects, about half reported dealing with back pain, overheating, chest pain, and shortness of breath. Around 40% dealt with itching, bad posture and shoulder pain. Overall, about three in four people dealt with affected skin or tissue, and three in four likewise dealt with some form of pain due to binding. Rarely, binding may result in fractured ribs. People with larger chests face higher risk of skin and tissue injuries, but no higher risk of pain or respiratory issues.

=== Risk factors ===
To minimise complications, some limit their binding use for no longer than eight hours. Community resources frequently recommend this guideline, but the 2024 binding survey found that limiting hours per use did not reduce most health complications except for skin infections. Binding for extended periods of time can lead to rashes or yeast infections under the breasts. According to the 2024 study, health complications were most associated with how many days per week people bind. The researchers recommend prioritizing no-binder days over limiting how many hours a binder is worn.

Other common recommendations from LGBTQ+ organizations for safer binding often include wearing a correctly sized binder and not sleeping in one. These recommendations are generally sourced from collected personal experiences.

Skin, tissue, and musculoskeletal injury risk increases based on the number of years people bind. Long-term binding may adversely affect the outcome of a future mastectomy. Unsafe binding may lead to permanent deformation of the breasts, scarring, and lung constriction.

Some binding materials, such as duct tape, body tape, binding tape or athletic bandages, are known to increase an individual's risk for negative health outcomes such as shortness of breath, musculoskeletal damage, and skin damage. Elastic bandages, plastic wrap, and duct tape were associated with a variety of negative health impacts in the 2024 binding survey, while sports bras, layered sports bras, and neoprene or athletic compression wear were associated with the least harms. Commercial binders were associated with some of the most negative health impacts in the survey, and this may be due to the greater compression that they can provide over other methods. The survey did not have enough information to investigate whether all binders caused these issues or if certain uses of them increased risk.

== See also ==
- Breast fetishism
- Breast reduction
- Gender-affirming surgery (female-to-male)
- History of cross-dressing
