= Hezi (clothing) =

Traditional Chinese corset-like garment

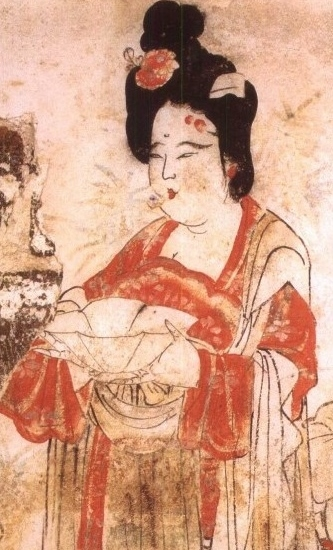
- What is typically believed to be a hezi worn on top of a qixiong ruqun, the hezi is red and is styled like flower petals
- Designer: Attributed to Yang Guifei
- Year: Originated in the Tang dynasty, China; re-introduced in the 21st century.
- Type: A strapless corset-like traditional Chinese upper garment

Hezi
- Chinese: 诃子
Transcriptions

Moxiong
- Chinese: 抹胸
Transcriptions
Standard Mandarin
- Hanyu Pinyin: mòxiōng

Hezi (Chinese: 诃子), also known as moxiong (抹胸) in the Song dynasty, waxiong (袜胸), lanqun (襕裙), and Hehuan lanqun (合欢襕裙), is a type of imperial Chinese corset-like garment item, which is typically used as an undergarment or decorative over-garment accessory in hanfu. It originated from the Tang dynasty and its origin is attributed to the Tang dynasty imperial consort, Yang Guifei. The hezi was also used as an garment accessory in the qixiong ruqun; this Tang dynasty-style attire combination is sometimes referred as heziqun. The hezi became popular from the Tang to Ming dynasties. This garment item accessory bears resemblance to the Qing dynasty dudou but do not have the same construction and design. The Tang dynasty hezi and the Song dynasty moxiong are both garment items in hanfu which was revived in the 21st century following the Hanfu movement.

== Origins ==
The origins of the hezi is attributed to Yang Guifei, who covered her chest with a piece of embroidered cloth, according to the book Lei Shuo (类说) by Zeng Zao of the Song dynasty:

One day, Yang Guifei and An Lushan had a private date. In the middle of the date, An Lushan accidentally scratched Yang Guifei, and the wound was on her chest. She cried and said, 'I was afraid that the emperor would see the scratch, so I used gold in the shape of Hezi to cover the wound.'

This is also attested by Song Gaozhen (宋高承) in the Shiwujiyuan: yiqiudaifu – hezi (事物纪原·衣裘带服·诃子). The hezi then became popular as women in the palace imitated the trend of Yang Guifei.

In the Ming dynasty records Liuqing Rizha (留青日札) by Ming dynasty scholar Tian Yiheng, it is mentioned that the "waxiong, that is, Tang hezi and so on ...... from the back and surrounded by forward, so also named Hehuan lanqun".

== Construction and design ==
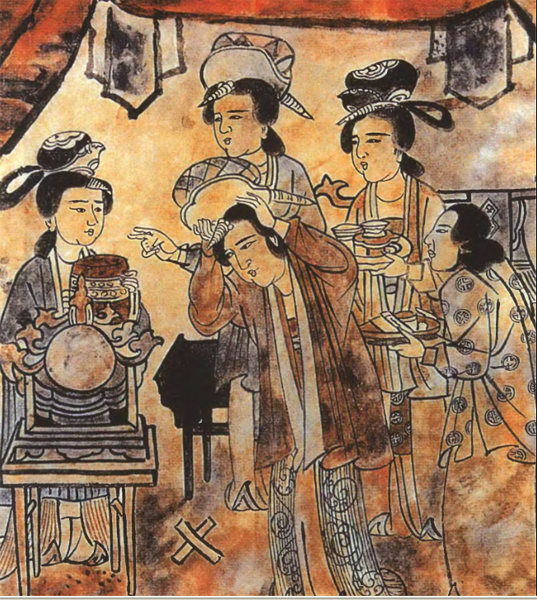
Women wearing moxiong under the beizi, Song dynasty mural painting

According to the Ming dynasty record, the Tang dynasty hezi is tied from the back to the front, and the lower part has a tie that the waistband of the qun (Chinese skirts) can be tied at the same time. It is suggested that the Tang dynasty hezi wrapped the breasts and the back areas of women. However, to date, there is a lack of unearthed archaeological artifact of the hezi dating from the Tang dynasty. The painting "Court Ladies Adorning Their Hair with Flowers" by the 8th century painter, Zhou Fang, of the Tang dynasty was used as the main reference to recover the heziqun nowadays.

On the other hand, there are archaeological artifacts of the Song dynasty moxiong which was unearthed in Fujian Province. The moxiong in the Song dynasty was a single-piece garment which was used as an underwear, but appears to have been more conservative in style as it covered both the breasts and belly areas of its wearer.

== Modern heziqun ==
In the 21sth, the hezi was designed by hanfu merchants as an accessory for the qixiong ruqun; it was designed with a square of fabric which bore similarities to the Song dynasty moxiong but featured small side ties to fasten the hezi allowing it to be worn on top of the top region of the qixiong ruqun. However, due to the lack of unearthed archaeological artifacts, this form of Tang dynasty hezi with side ties as a stand-alone accessory item was discontinued by hanfu merchants.

Modern heziqun, on the other hand, continues to be produced by hanfu merchants due to the existence of pictorial materials such as paintings, and mural reliefs; there are currently three forms of modern heziqun which is being sold and produced nowadays: (1) A hezi designed as single, rectangular piece of fabric in the construction of a Song dynasty moxiong matches with the high skirt of the qixiong as its outermost layer; (2) a single skirt known as "mountain-shaped piece" skirt creates the hezi-like effect where the front of the skirt is raised higher while the back of the skirt is narrower; and (3) a moxiong and a high-waist skirt is sewn together forming a single skirt.

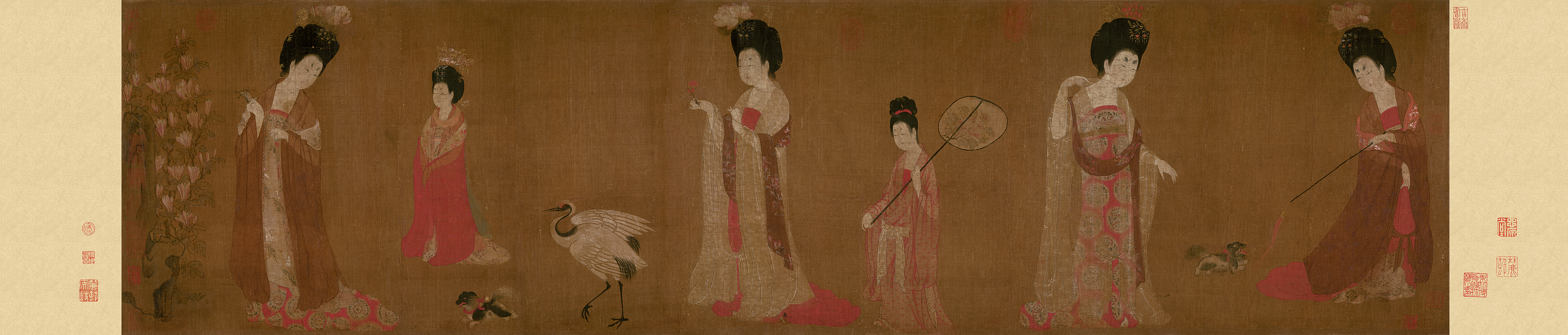
Four women wearing what is now referred as heziqun, Tang dynasty painting "Court Ladies Adorning Their Hair with Flowers" by Zhou Fang.

== Modern moxiong ==
Nowadays, there are three main types of Song dynasty-style moxiong produced and sold by hanfu merchants: the gongzizhe (工字褶; 'box-pleated') moxiong; the sanjiao shousheng (三角收省; 'triangle pleated dart') moxiong, and (3) yipianshi moxiong (一片式抹胸; 'one-piece moxiong'), a moxiong with no pleats. The gongzizhe moxiong features box pleats; it is actually a 21st-century invention and did not exist in the Song dynasty; its creation and development was the result of restoration mistakes by early hanfu merchants when attempting to restore the Song dynasty cultural relics of the actual clothing item. It, however, continues to be sold in the current hanfu market. A special style of Song dynasty-style moxiong which is currently produced is a backless moxiong, which was designed in imitation to the moxiong artifacts unearthed from the tomb of Huang Sheng dating in the Southern Song dynasty.

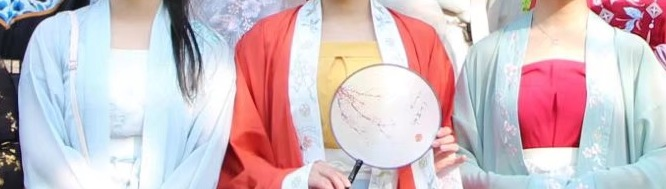
Three main styles of the Song dynasty-style moxiong, 2021. From left to right: yipianshi moxiong (pleat-less), sanjiao shousheng moxiong (moxiong with dart), and gongzizhe moxiong (box-pleated).

== See also ==
- Hanfu accessories
- Qixiong ruqun
