= Qixiong ruqun =

Traditional Chinese garment; part of the hanfu

Qixiong Ruqun
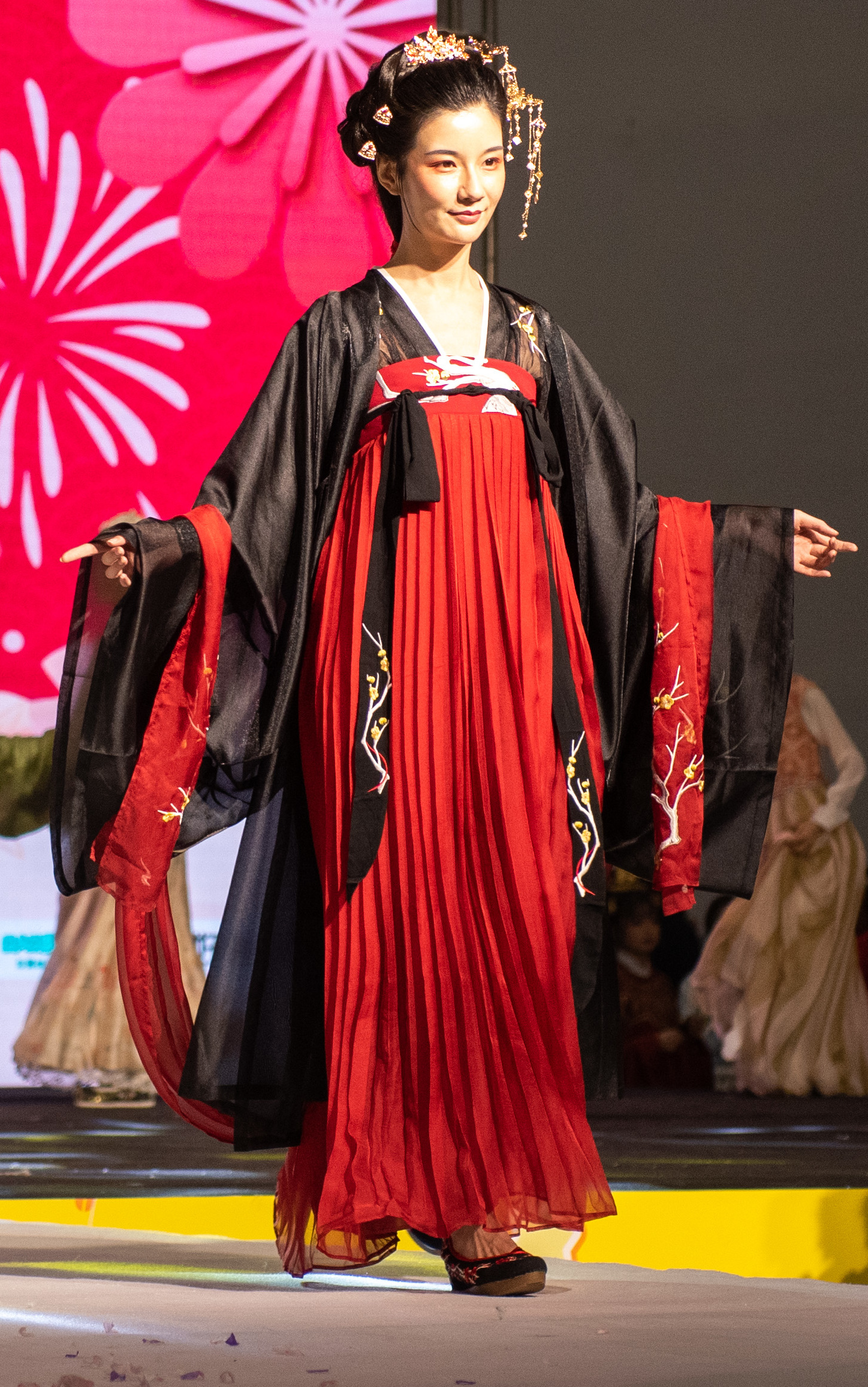
- A Chinese lady wearing qixiong shanqun (齊胸衫裙), a style of ruqun popular in China during the Sui dynasty and Tang dynasty.

Chinese name
- Traditional Chinese: 齊胸襦裙
- Simplified Chinese: 齐胸襦裙
Transcriptions
Standard Mandarin
- Hanyu Pinyin: Qíxiōng rúqún

Korean name
- Hangul: 제흉유군

Qixiong ruqun (simplified Chinese: 齐胸襦裙; traditional Chinese: 齊胸襦裙), which can also be referred as Qixiong shanqun (simplified Chinese: 齐胸衫裙; traditional Chinese: 齊胸衫裙), also known as "chest-high ruqun", is a type of clothing in hanfu, the traditional Chinese clothing worn by Han Chinese people. The qixiong ruqun is a unique style of ruqun (襦裙)), which is characterized with a high waistline qun, Chinese skirt. The qun used in the qixiong ruqun is generally tied above the bust level. It was worn by women during the Southern dynasties, Sui dynasty, Tang dynasty and Five Dynasties and Ten Kingdoms period. The style was also revived in the early and middle Ming dynasty.

Since the Han dynasty and Jin (Chinese state), the waist of the skirt has typically been tied on the waist, while in the Sui dynasty, Tang dynasty and Five Dynasties, the waistband of the dress was much higher, many of which were usually above the chest or under the armpit. Some records of clothing history refer to it as the high-waist ruqun. Later, it was renamed to qixiong ruqun, according to the current inspection and certification by people. The qixiong ruqun was a typical form of women's hanfu in the Tang dynasty.

The qixiong ruqun of the Tang dynasty was also introduced in Korea during the Silla period, and was also introduced in Balhae. This form of high-waist skirt which ties to the chest can still be seen in the chima worn in present-day Korean women's hanbok; it is also likely that the current women's hanbok has been derived from the Tang dynasty's high-waisted skirt with a short ru (襦) or from a later revival of the Tang dynasty fashion. Qixiong ruqun was also adopted by the Khitan women and continued to be worn in Liao dynasty even after the fall of the Tang dynasty.

== Terminology ==
The qixiong ruqun was named after its location on the wearer's body. It is distinguished from the gaoyao ruqun (高腰襦裙; "high-waisted ruqun"), which is attached below the chest and above the waist. Qiyao ruqun (齐腰襦裙; "waist ruqun") is tied at the waist while qixiong ruqun is tied under the armpit. In ancient times, ruqun dresses for women were not very high waisted, but ruqun dresses with very high waists appeared from the Northern and Southern dynasties to the Sui dynasty, Tang dynasty and Five Dynasties. Some clothing history records call it the high-waisted ruqun, and it was later changed to qixiong ruqun according to the current people's examination and certification of it.

== History ==
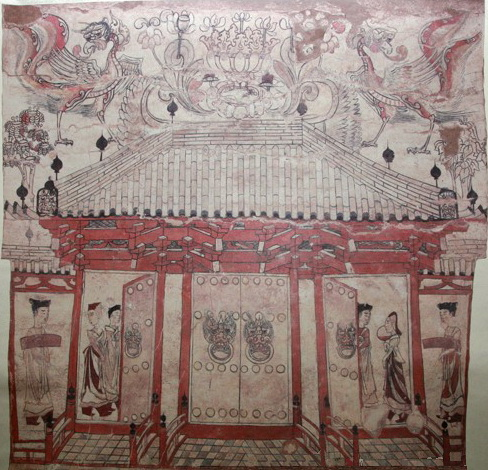
Women wearing early forms of Qixiong ruqun with shoulder straps, Northern Qi (550-577 AD).

The qixiong ruqun first appeared in the Northern and Southern dynasties. The qixiong ruqun was worn during the Sui dynasty, Tang dynasty, and Five dynasties, until the Song dynasty, when, upon Neo-Confucianism's rise, the fashion of the Tang dynasty faded.

=== Northern and Southern dynasties ===
Prior to the Putong period (520–527 AD) of the Liang dynasty, the waistline of the women's ruqun was located at the waist. During the Southern dynasties, the women's ruqun evolved and was tied higher. Their ruqun belt line became higher and the skirt was attached at the chest level. Their ru (襦) had open necklines. The ru (襦) with open neckline started during the Datong period (527–529 AD); prior to that, the collars of the women's ru were designed to be tight-fitting from the Southern Qi dynasty (479–502 AD) to the Liang dynasty.

=== Sui and Tang dynasties ===
During the Sui dynasty and Tang dynasty, blouses were generally worn as short ru (襦); banbi (半臂) (i.e. short-sleeved upper garment)and pibo (an accessory which looked like a long shawl) both constituted an integral part of ruqun.

==== Sui dynasty ====
During the Sui dynasty, the dress code of the Han dynasty was revised and a clothing system with the characteristic of the Han Chinese was established. In this period, the ru (襦) with short sleeves became a popular trend for the time.

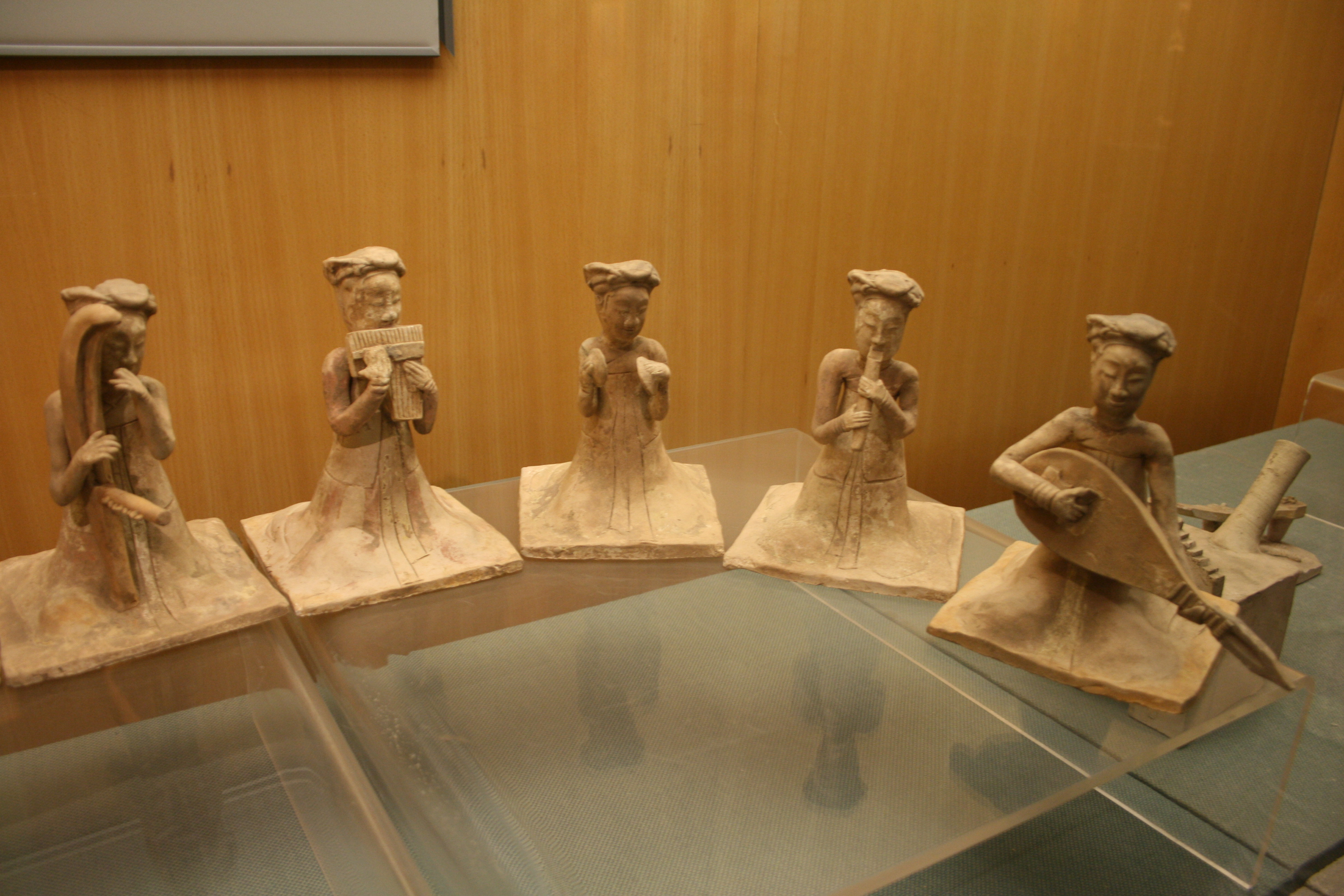
Musicians wearing qixiong ruqun, Sui dynasty figurines.

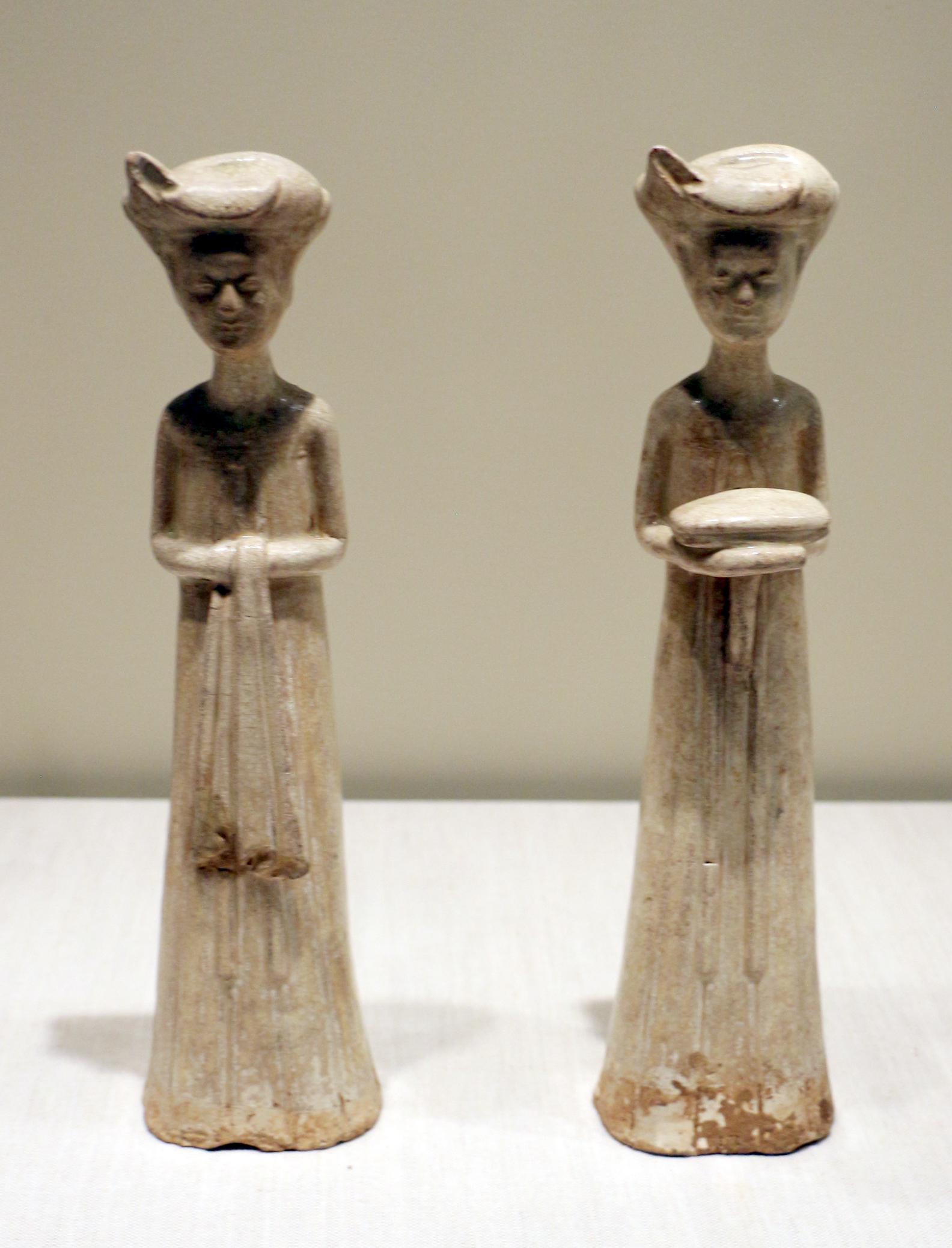
Sui dynasty female attendants wearing qixiong ruqun.

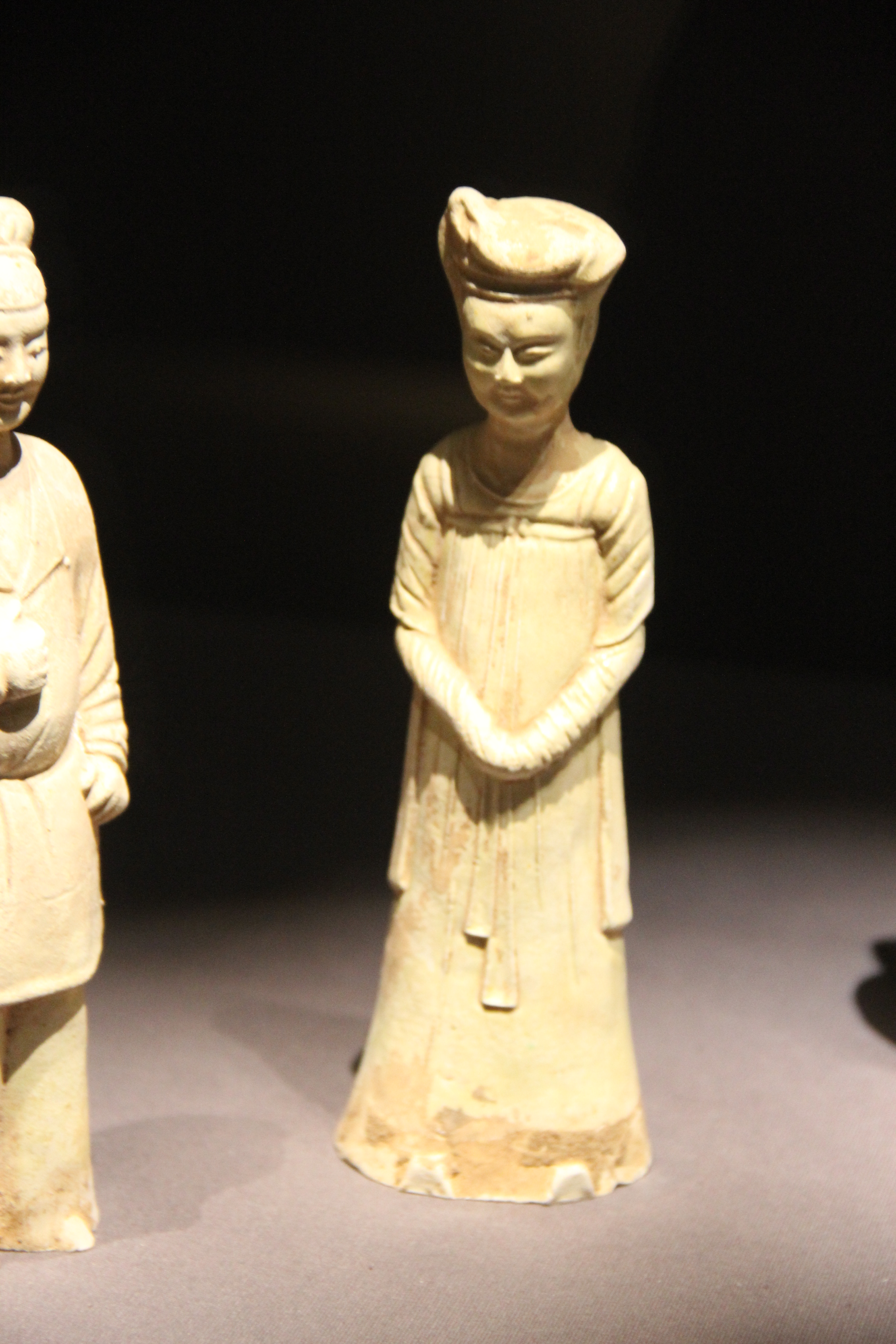
Sui Painted Pottery Attendant

==== Tang dynasty ====
The Tang dynasty was the heyday of economic, cultural, artistic and diplomatic history in Chinese history. It also created the characteristics of this dynasty's freedom, gracefulness, and colourful clothing.

Tang dynasty people wore short sleeved ru (襦) and a floor-length skirt, but after the heyday of the Tang dynasty, the aristocratic costumes became larger and more complex. Qixiong ruqun is a representative costume of the Tang dynasty and was very popular among Tang dynasty ladies. In the Tang dynasty, qixiong ruqun was typically worn with a wide-sleeved blouse, long-full skirt, and long silk scarves with painted motifs as part of the set of attire. It was typically worn by noble ladies or female attendants who served in high status households, such as in important families and even the royal family. During the High Tang period, women were less constrained by feudal ideas and wore clothing which allowed the exposure of cleavage. The traditional form of ruqun worn in the previous dynasties was maintained in the Tang dynasty, but the "V" collar of the ru was deepened to the point that the cleavage was exposed. The skirt waistband being tied at the chest or at the armpits allowed the neck and chest regions to be exposed.

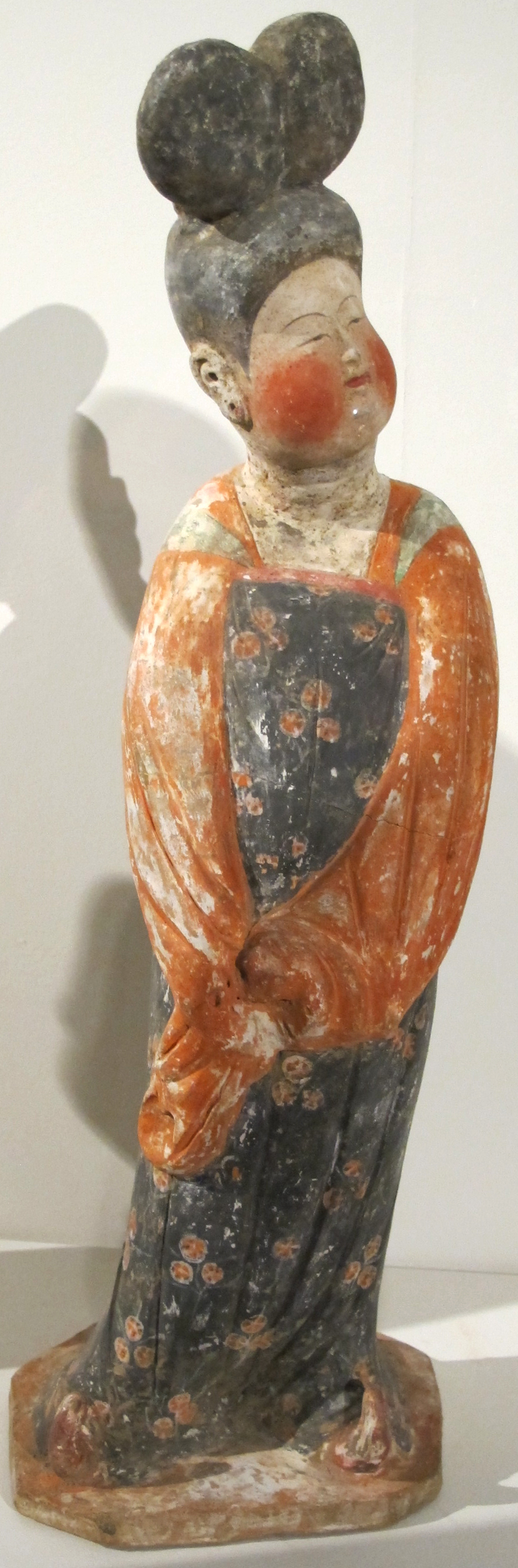
Qixiong ruqun with shoulder straps, Tang dynasty, 8th century

When the skirt qun (裙), ru (襦), and pibo (披帛) are paired together, the woman's grace and temperament in the Tang dynasty was fully presented, showing a poetic beauty and rhythm. The styles of qixiong ruqun with shoulder straps are often found in pottery figurines or paintings unearthed before the Tang dynasty. The qixiong ruqun with shoulder straps appeared to have been rarely used in China until the development of the Kaiyuan (开元) period of the Tang dynasty, when the style became fixed under the armpit. The ru (襦) neckline varied, and the most popular one was daxiushan (大袖衫), which was full of the spirit of the people's ideological emancipation during the Tang dynasty.

There were variety of skirts during the Tang dynasty. At the beginning of the Tang dynasty, the skirts were narrow but became looser in the High Tang period. The style of the skirt is stitched with four fabrics, the upper part is narrow, the lower part is loose, and the hem hangs down to the ground. Silk is used at the waist of the skirt, and laces are sewn at both ends. Skirt (qun; 裙) fabrics were mainly silk fabrics. The more expensive the materials, the better. The design of the waist of the skirt was much improved. The dresses of this period are brightly coloured, the most popular of which were dark red, purple, moon green, grass green, etc. For example:

1. Striped skirt (jianqun): High-waisted striped skirts became mainstream during the Northern dynasties and lasted until the Sui-Tang dynasties.
2. Pomegranate skirt (石榴裙; Shiliuqun): the colour pomegranate red was famous for the longest time.
3. Bainiao skirt: Emperor Zhongzong of Tang’s daughter, Princess Anle, had a skirt made up of the feathers of many types of birds, called bainiao skirt (qun 裙), which is a famous work in the history of Chinese weaving. The colour of the skirt changed shifted in sunlight.
4. Zhou dynasty's bell skirt: A skirt which was decorated with twelve bells at the four corners of the dress. When the wearer walked, they made a "jingle" noise, which was seen as very graceful and beautiful.

Many unearthed cultural relics and antique paintings have record of the qixiong ruqun. For example, the famous picture Court Ladies Preparing Newly Woven Silk in the heyday of the Tang dynasty shows similar costumes.

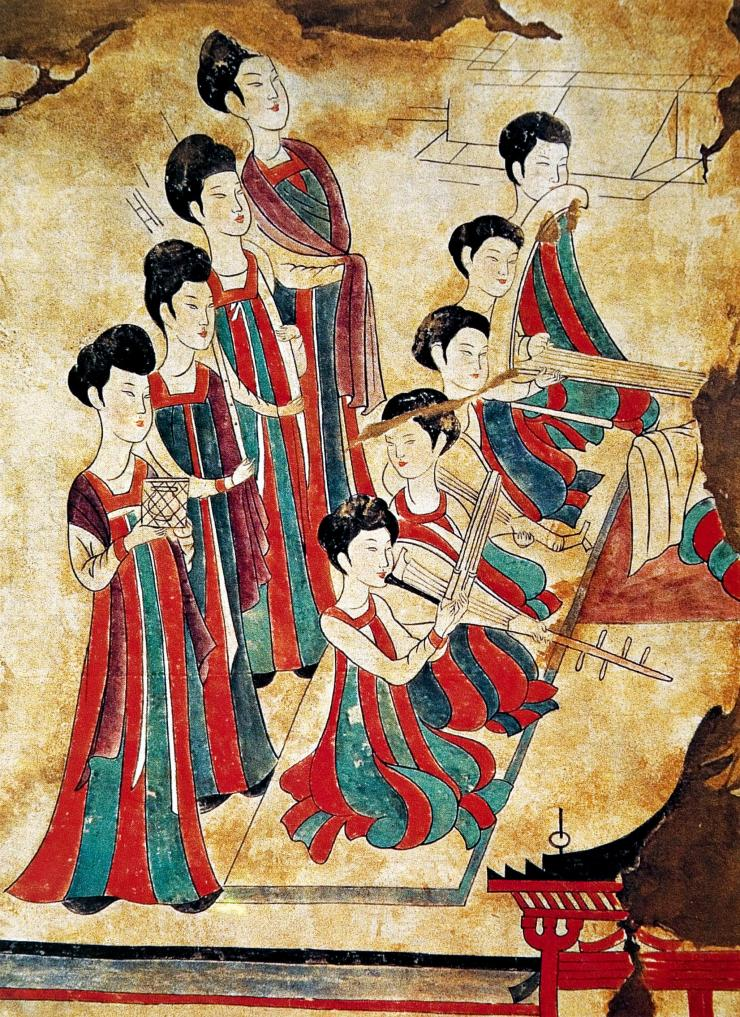
A Group of Tang Dynasty Musicians from the Tomb of Li Shou.

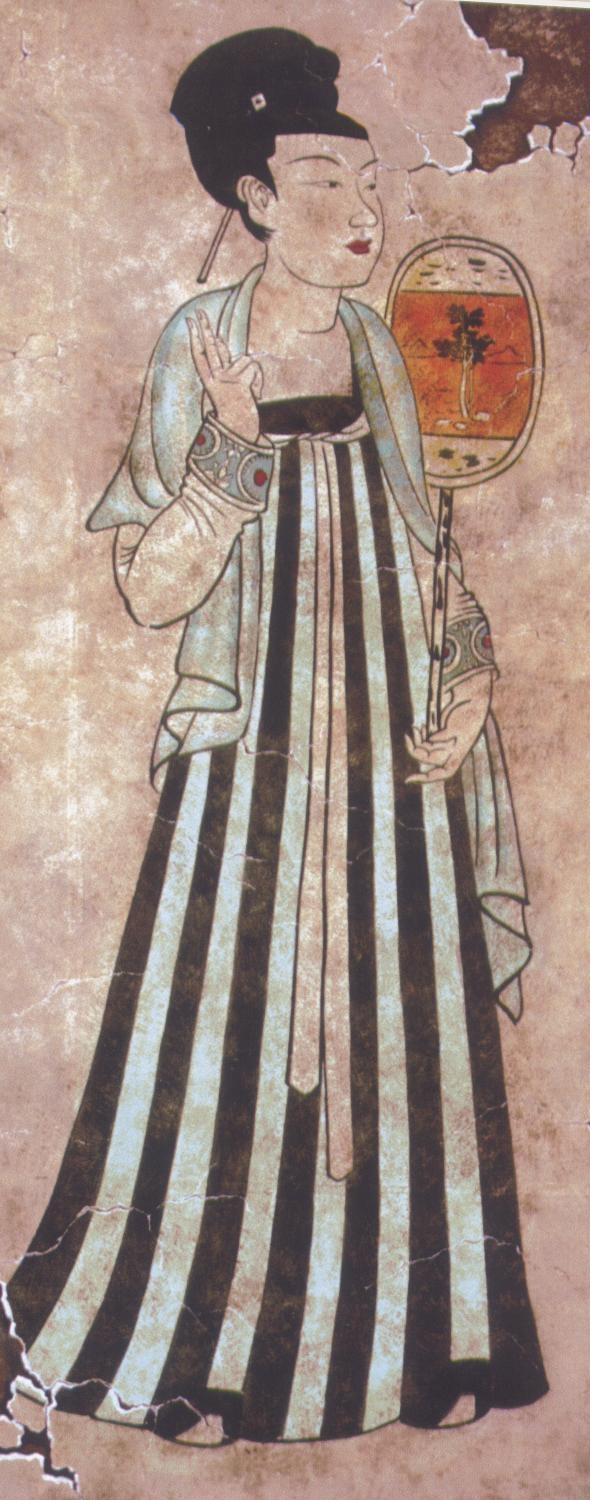
Tang dynasty painting.

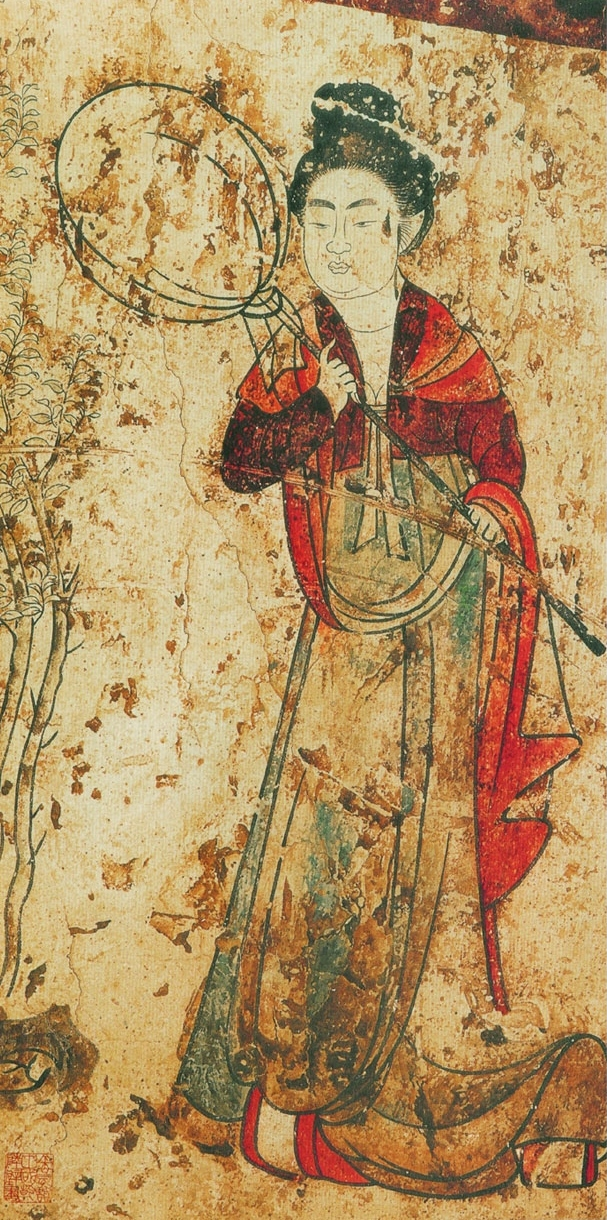
Tang dynasty painting.

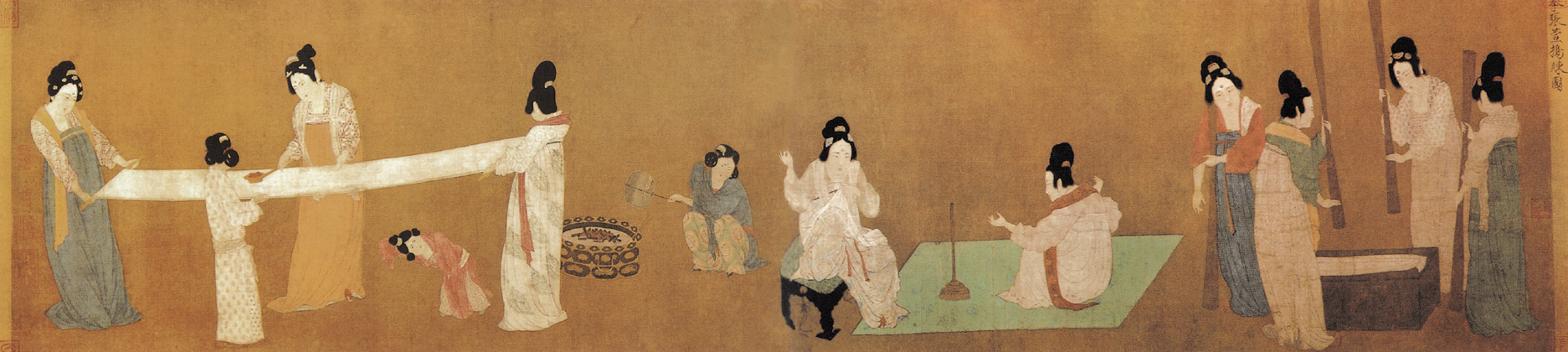
Court Ladies Preparing Newly Woven Silk (捣练图).

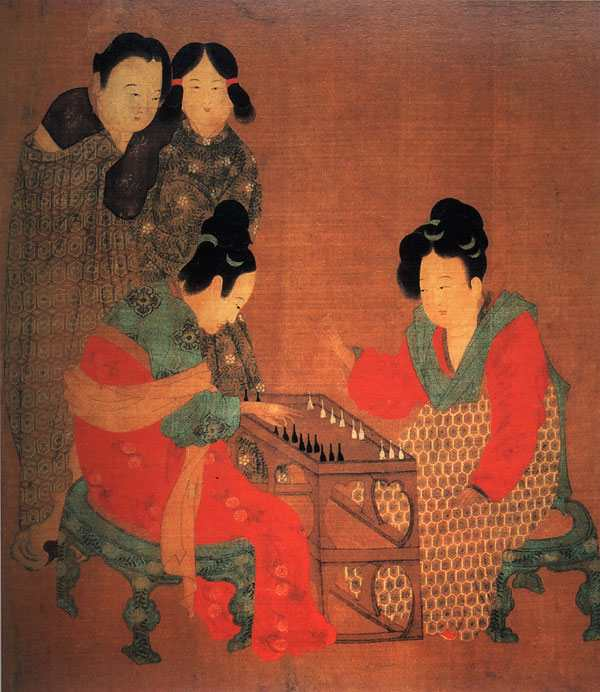
Tang dynasty women.

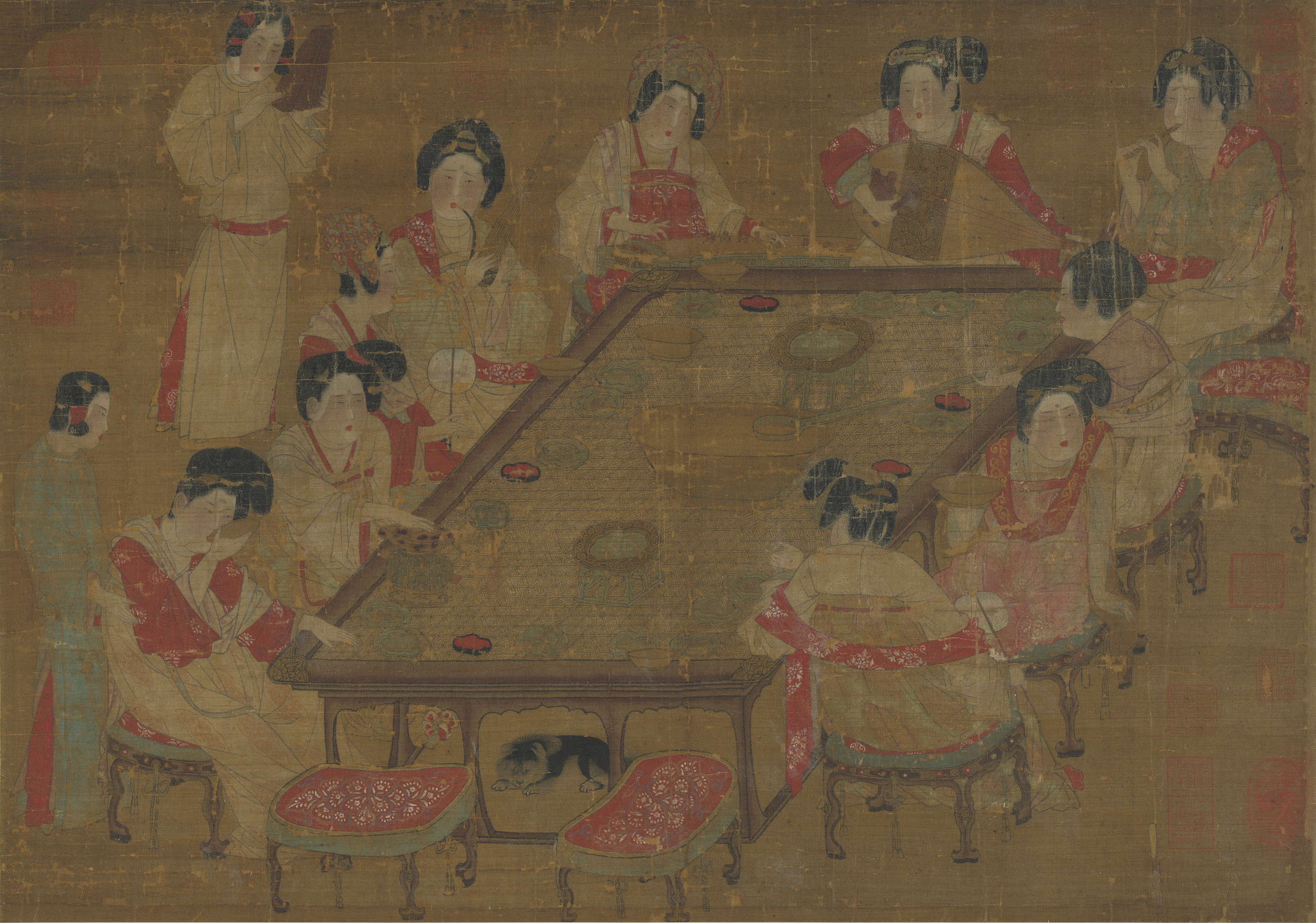
One-piece and two-piece style qixiong ruqun depicted in Tang dynasty painting "A palace concert".

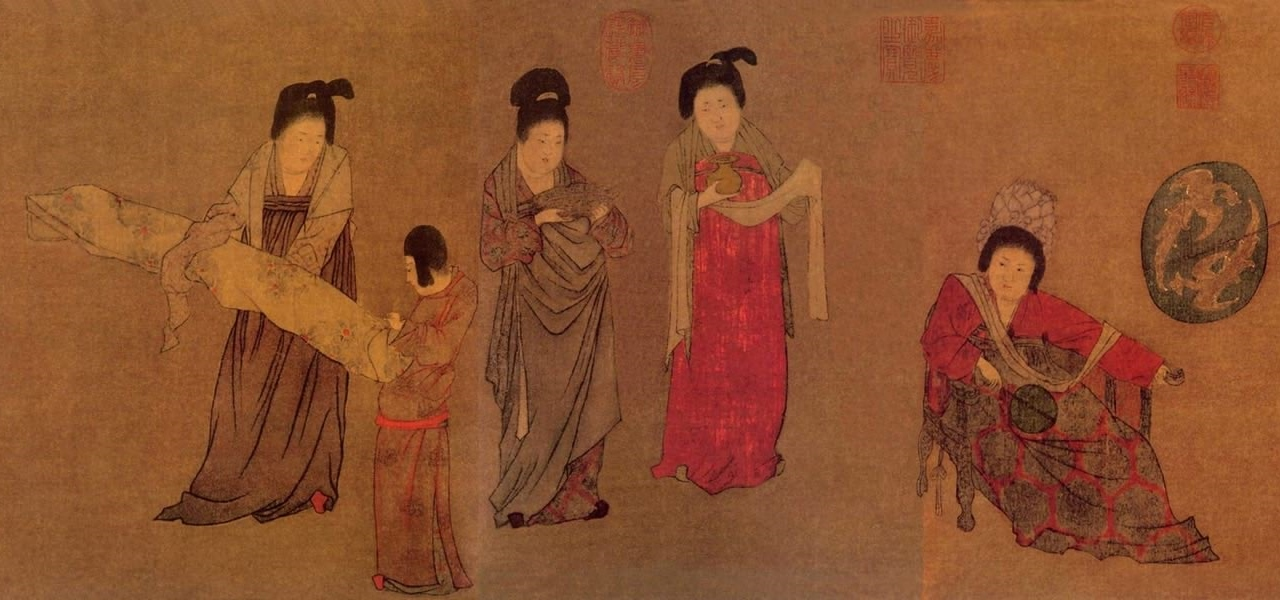
Tang dynasty painting.

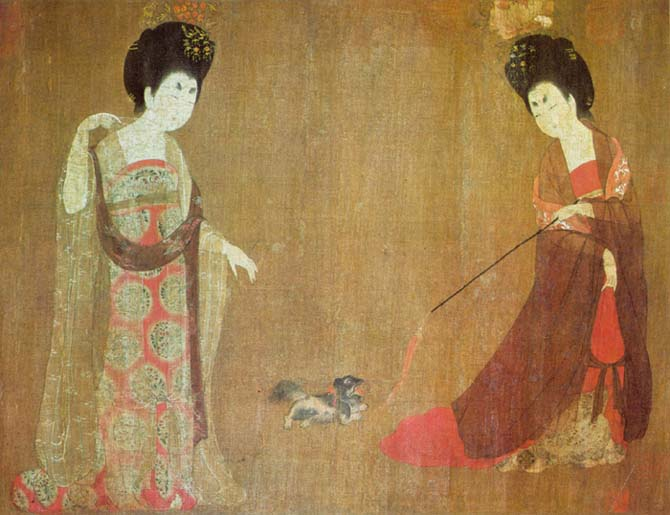
Tang dynasty women.

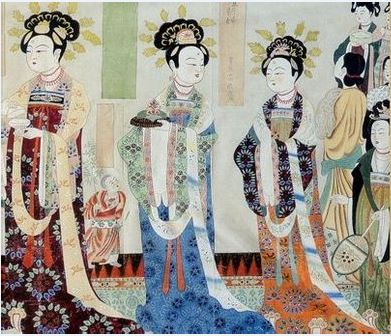
Noble Ladies Worshipping Buddha, Tang dynasty painting.

=== Five dynasties and Ten Kingdoms period to Song dynasty ===
Qixiong ruqun continued to be worn in the Five dynasties and Ten Kingdoms period.

During the Song dynasty, the fashion was different from that of the Tang dynasty. With the rise of Neo-Confucianism, Song dynasty women were encouraged to reject the extravagant fashion of the Tang dynasty. The clothing of the Tang dynasty, which emphasized body curves and low-cut garments which exposed cleavage, was perceived as sensual and obscene by the Song dynasty women. The qixiong ruqun however continued to be depicted in the paintings of the Song dynasty.

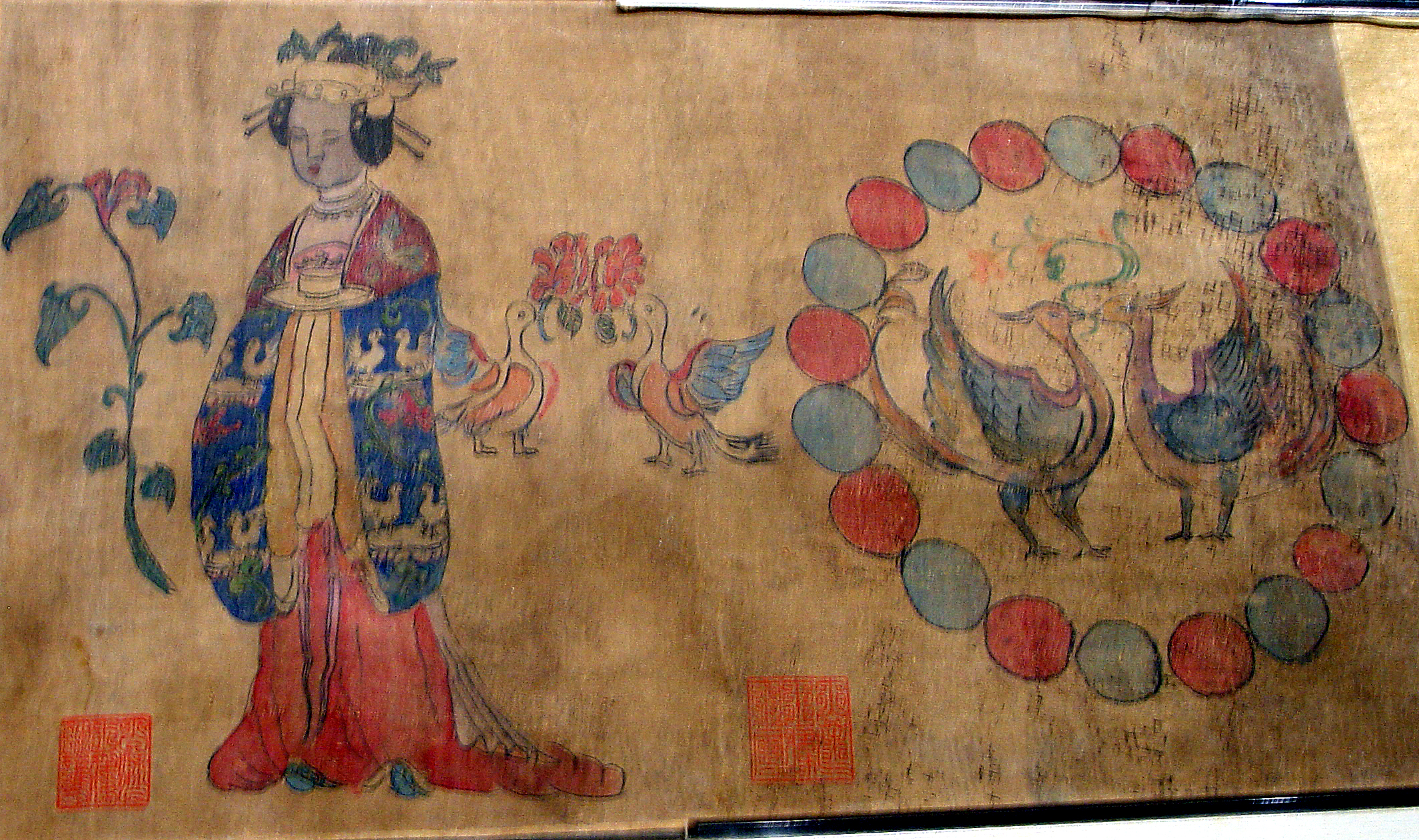
A lady, Five Dynasties Period (907-979).

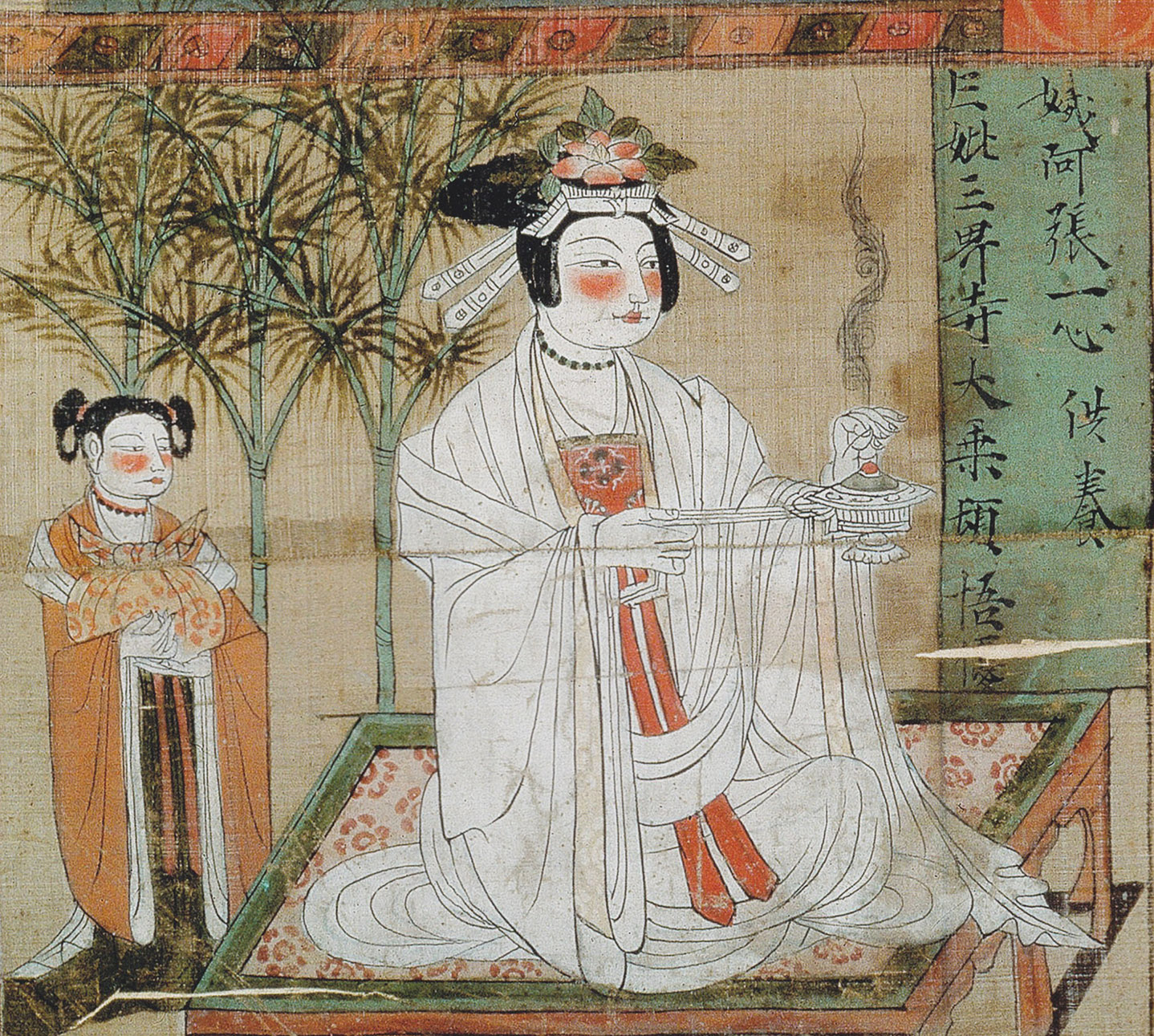
Buddhist donatress Chang (張氏供養人), painting from Mo-kao Caves, Five Dynasties and Ten Kingdoms.

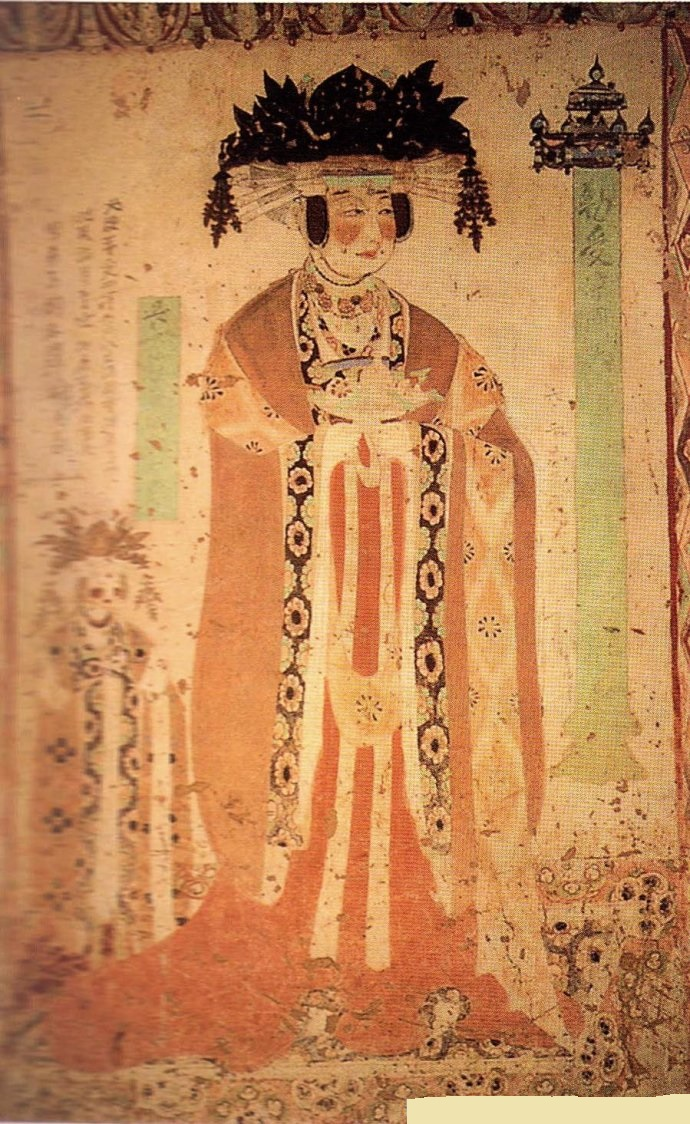
Buddhist donatress, Yü-lin Caves 19, Five Dynasties and Ten Kingdoms, d.926 AD.

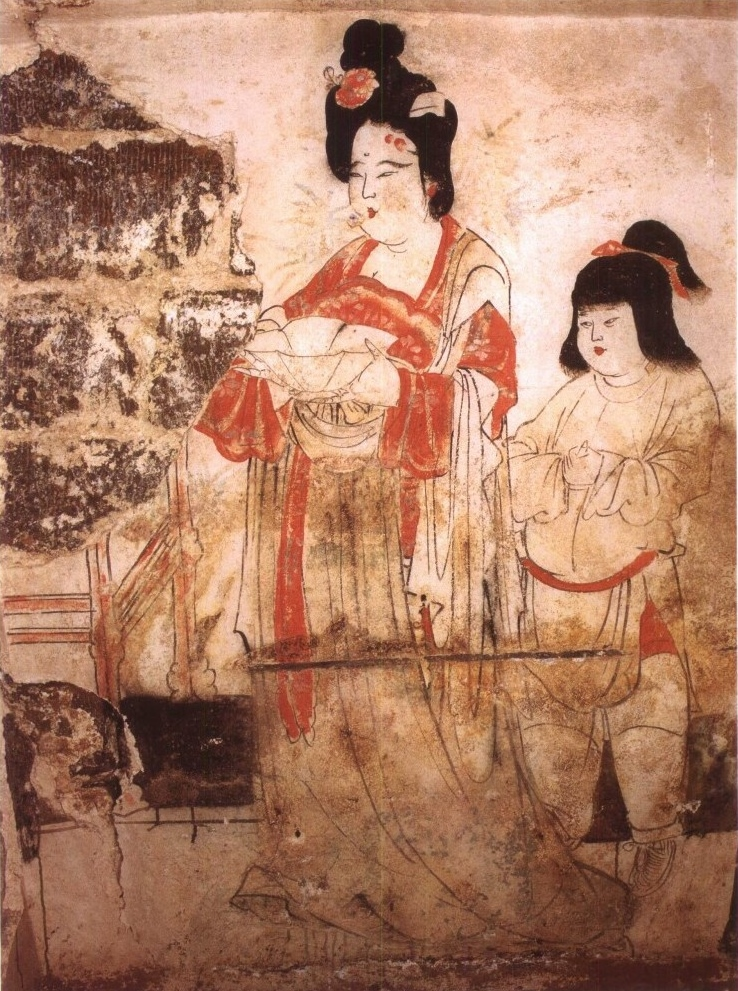
Mural Painting of a woman from Tomb of Wang Ch'u-chih (王處直), Five Dynasties and Ten Kingdoms.

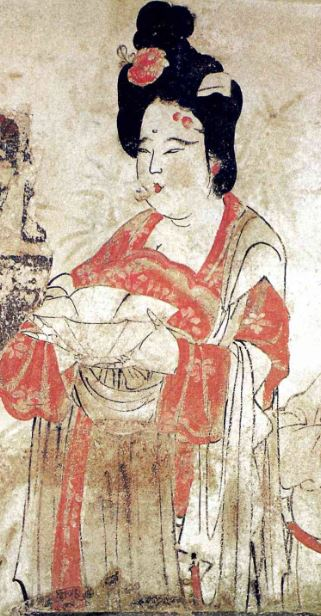
Detail of a Mural Painting from Tomb of Wang Ch'u-chih (王處直), Five Dynasties and Ten Kingdoms.

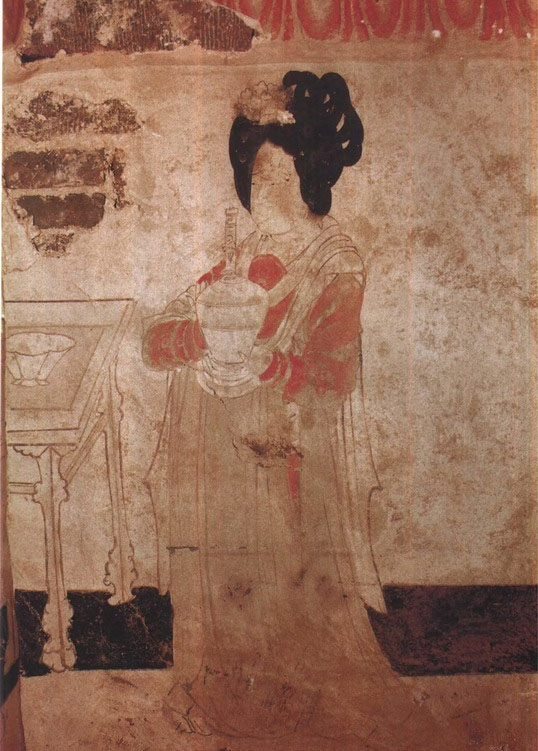
Mural Painting of a woman from Tomb of Wang Ch'u-chih (王處直), Five Dynasties and Ten Kingdoms.

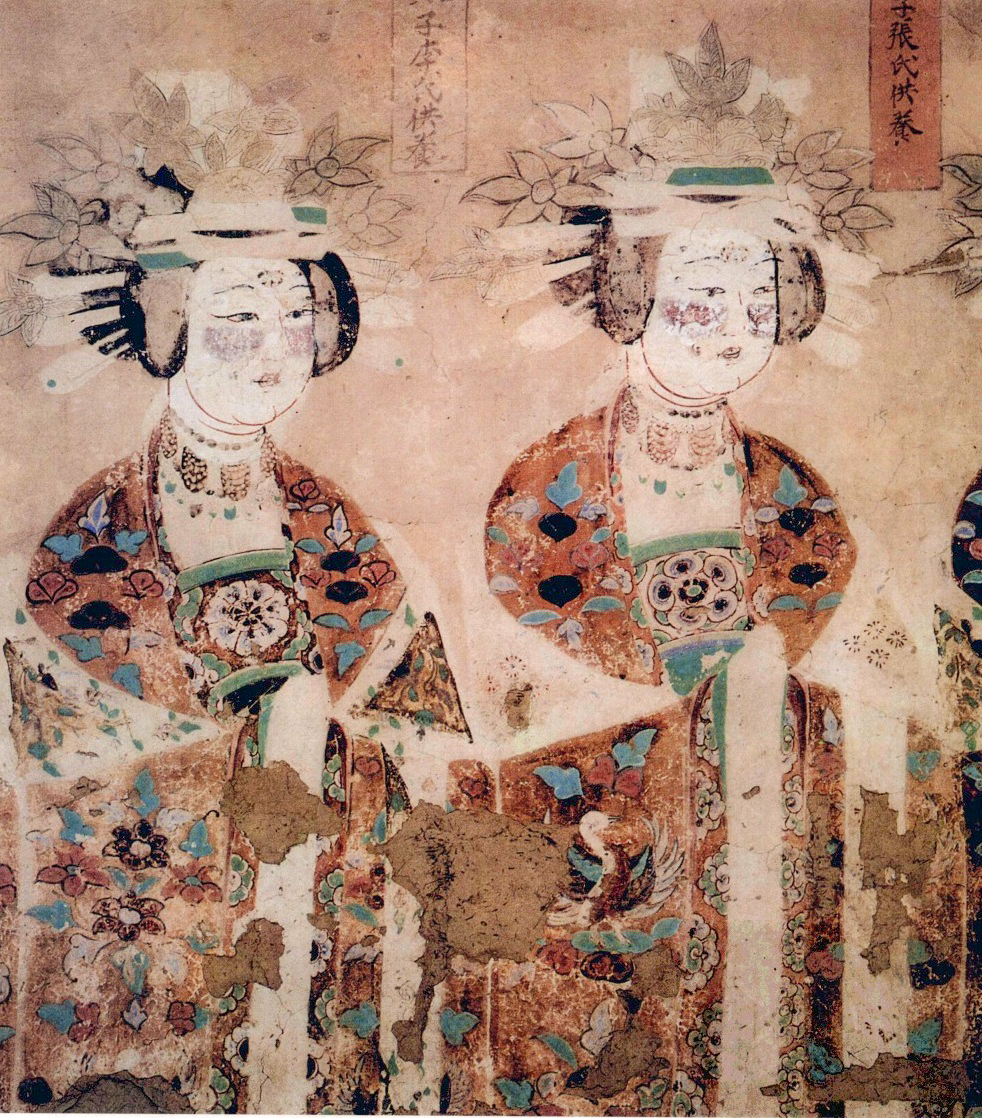
Buddhist donors from Cave 98 at Mo-kao, Five Dynasties or early Northern Song dynasty.

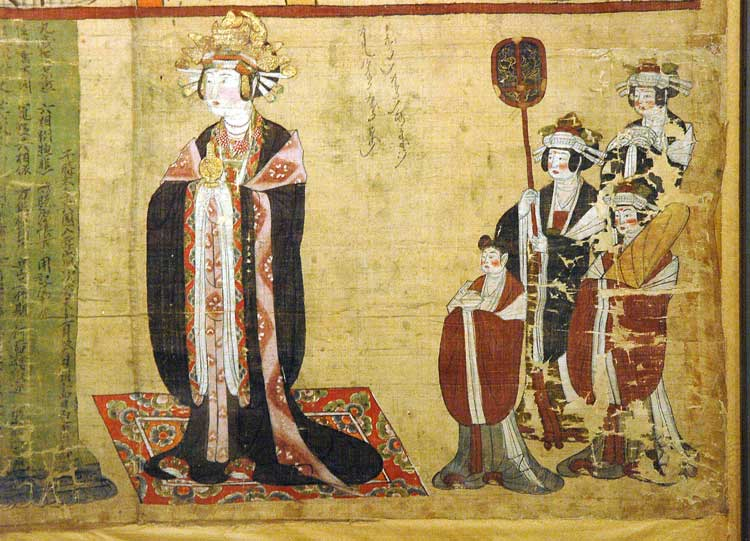
Buddhist donors in qixiong ruqun, early Northern Song dynasty, 983 A.D.

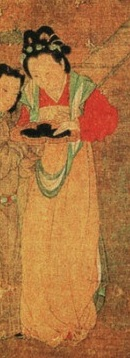
Qixiong ruqun, Southern Song painting by Wang Shên.

=== Ming dynasty ===
The Tang dynasty-style high-waisted skirt which tied to the chest area (just below the bust-line) and was worn with a short and very tight sleeved jacket was revived in the early and middle Ming dynasty when it was especially worn by young women. This strongly influenced the development of the Korean hanbok.

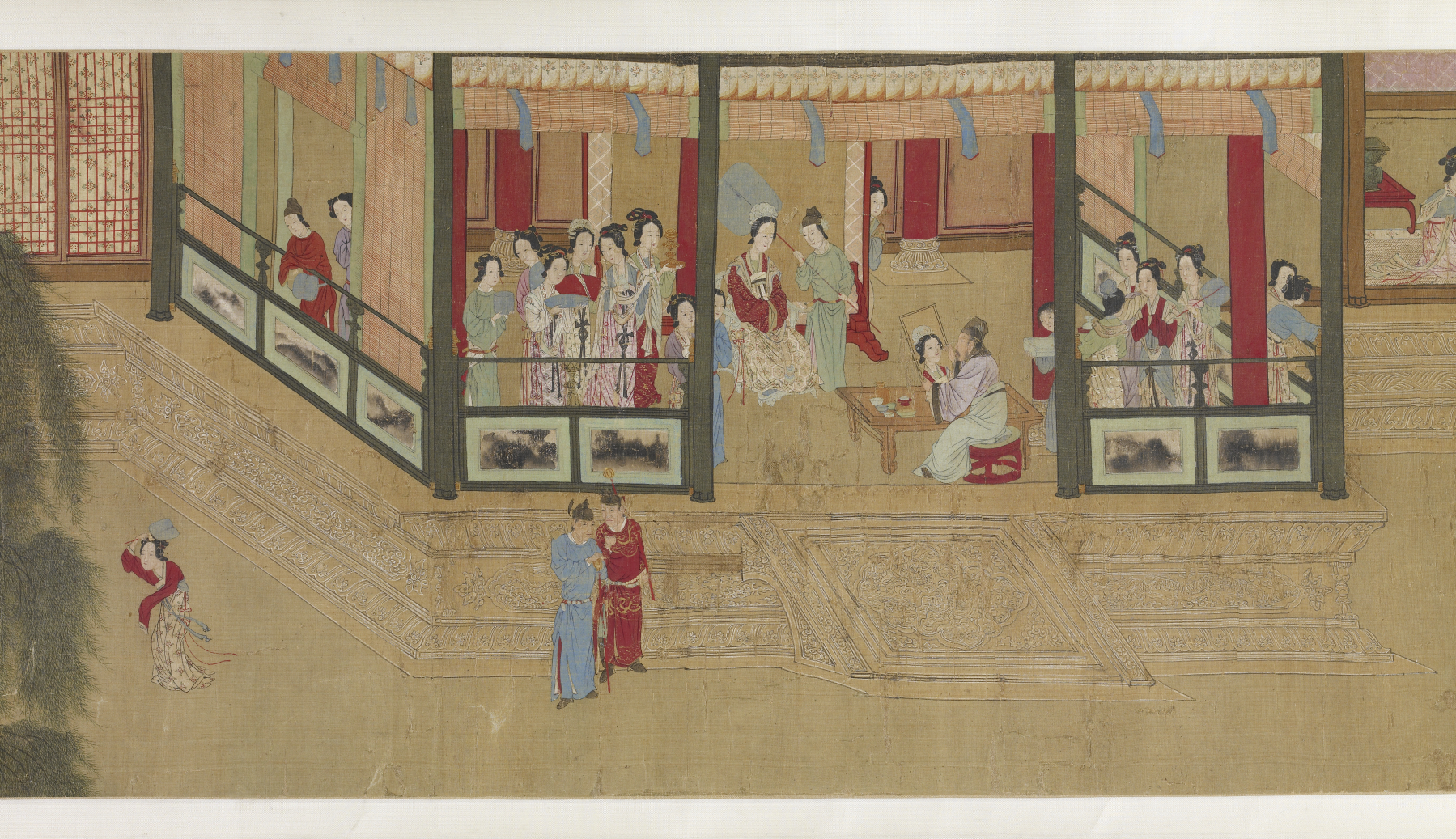
Spring Morning in the Han Palace, by the Ming dynasty painter Qiu Ying.

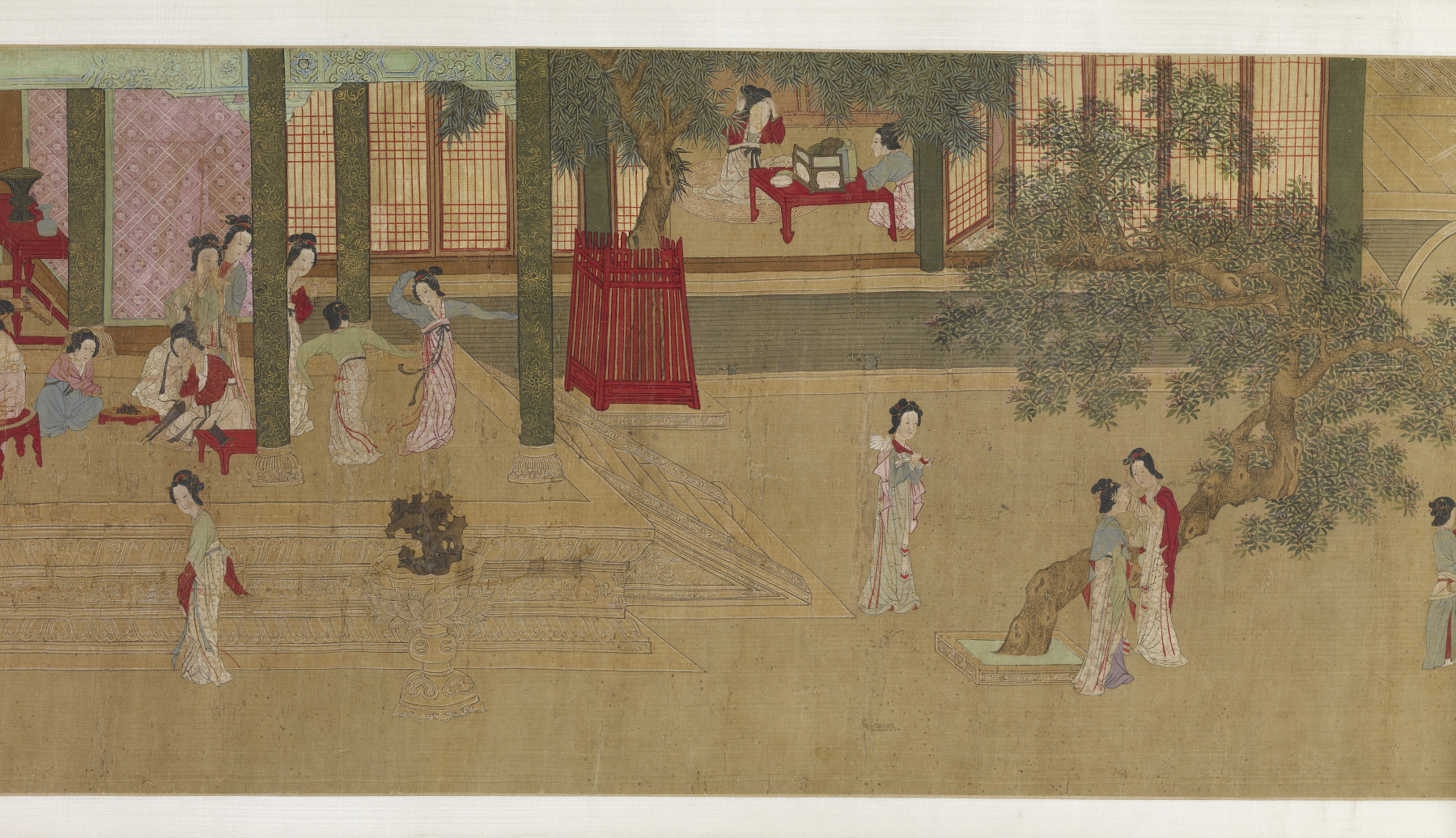
Spring Morning in the Han Palace, by the Ming dynasty painter Qiu Ying.

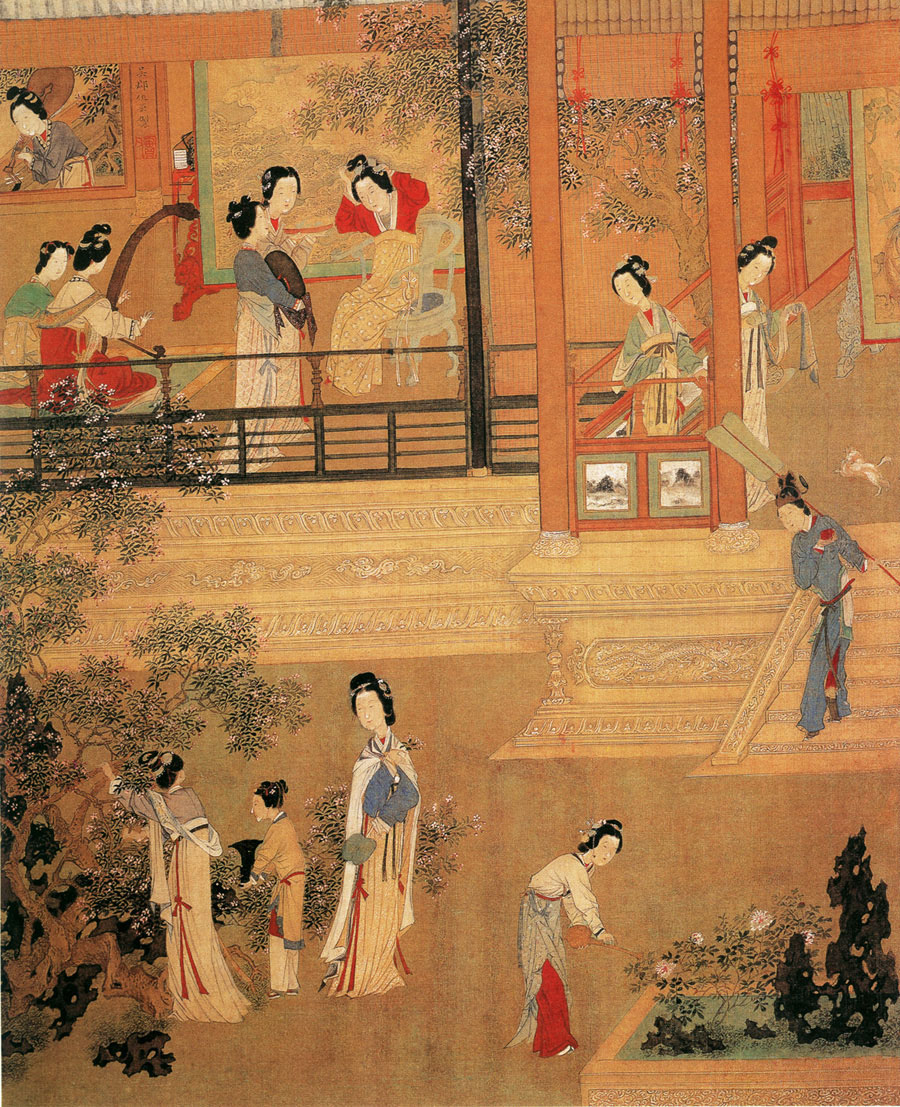

== Modern wear ==
In modern times with the increasing popularity of hanfu and driven by the hanfu movement, the qixiong ruqun gained popularity among young women. The modern qixiong ruqun is controversial due to the rarity of unearthed historical clothing.

The modern qixiong ruqun which is found on the current market comes into two forms:

1. one-piece style, and
2. two-piece style with a slit under the waist.

The former is well accepted as being an authentic shape, as such form of skirt was unearthed in archeological findings, whereas the latter is controversial as it is a style which (so far) can only be found in ancient paintings, such as the Tang dynasty era A Palace Concert painting.

=== How to wear the modern qixiong ruqun ===
The qixiong ruqun can be found into a one-piece and two-pieces skirts.

The one-piece style qixiong ruqun is a traditional Chinese one-piece skirt which is tied like a wrap-skirt.

The two-piece style qixiong ruqun consists of two pieces of fabric. It is presented as two pieces of fabric incompletely sewn together on the side to form a rear and a front section and with two sets of ties. The method to tie the two-piece qixiong ruqun is different from the traditional one-piece skirt: first, the rear section is tied, and then the front section is tied.

== Influences and derivatives ==
=== Khitan Liao dynasty ===
From at least the Han dynasty until the Mongol period, Non-Han Chinese women (regardless of social status or cultural identity) who lived in Han dynasty territories wore Han Chinese clothing. During the Tang dynasty, Central Asian women also were depicted wearing Han Chinese style clothing. After the fall of the Tang dynasty, the Tang-style Han Chinese clothing continued to be worn in the Liao. The Khitans inherited the Hanfu from the Later Jin dynasty; the clothing of the Later Jin were actually clothing from the Tang dynasty.

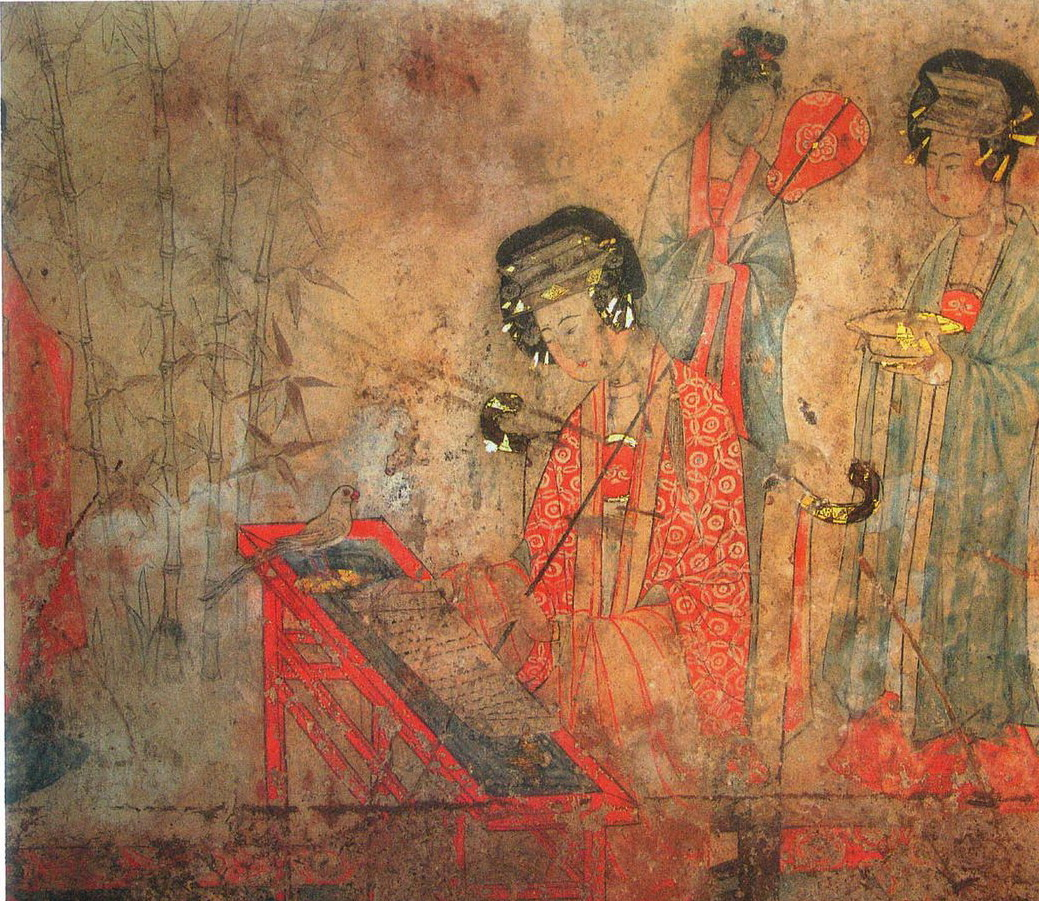
Qixiong ruqun, Liao dynasty.

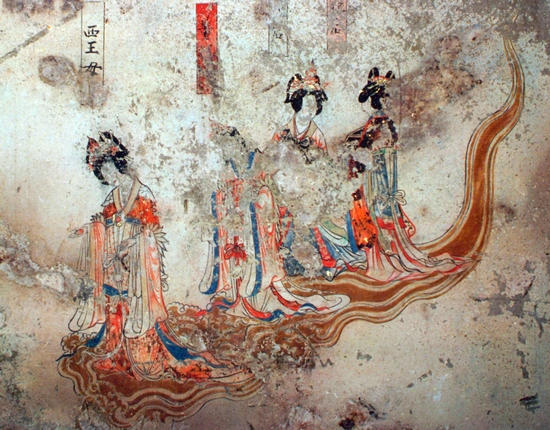
Qixiong ruqun, Liao dynasty.

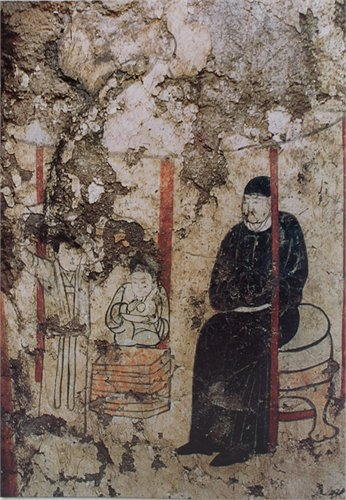
A female attendant wearing qixiong ruqun, mural tomb in Aohan, Liao dynasty.

=== Khotan ===
In Dunhuang, the clothing fashion of the 8th and 9th century AD closely followed the Tang dynasty's fashion. This trend later changed in the 10th century AD when the Uyghur clothing and Sino-Uygur headdress became more prominent.

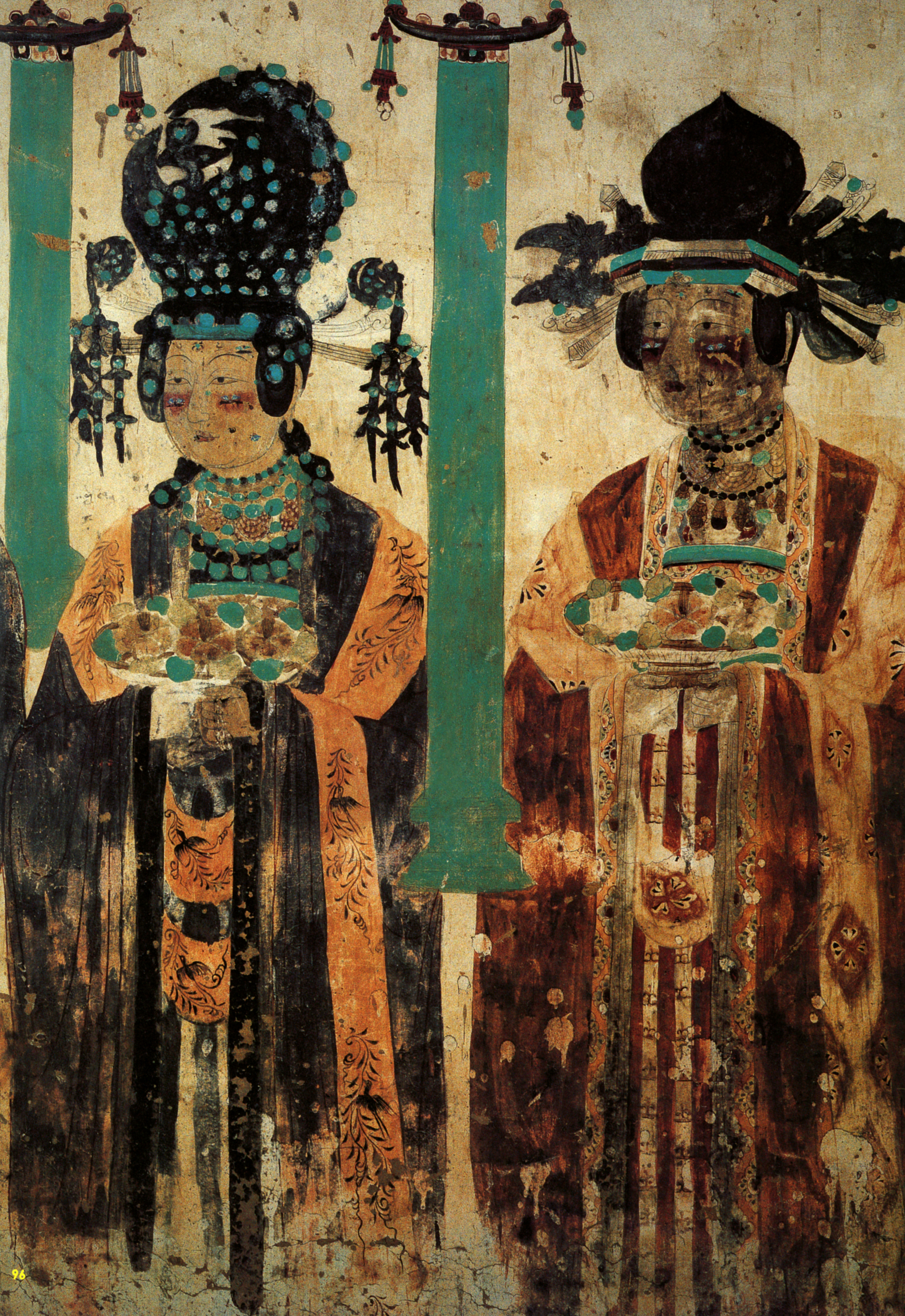
Khotanese donor ladies, Dunhuang cave 61.

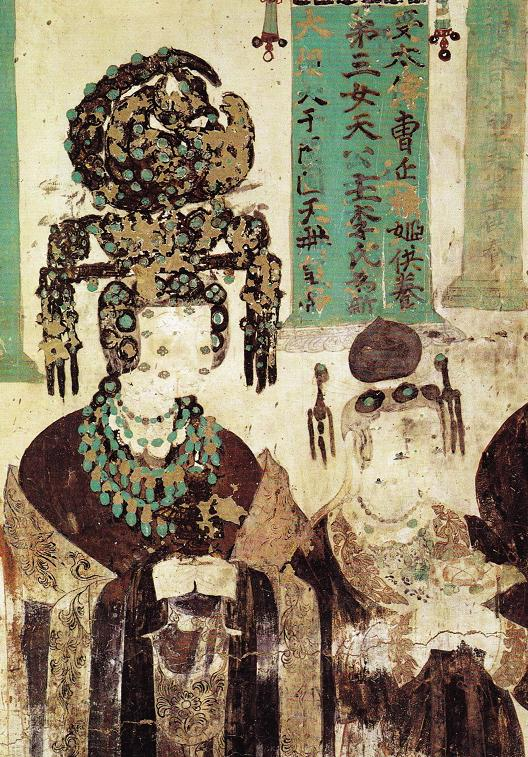
Wife of a Khotanese ruler (right) and a Uyghur lady in Uygur clothing (left), Mogao cave 61.

=== Korea ===
In Silla, the clothing of Korean women was influenced by the fashion of the Tang dynasty due to cultural interactions. Chinese-style clothing and Chinese fashion was introduced in the Unified Silla period. Some clay figures found in that period show the high-waist line skirt worn over the jacket and appear to have shoulder straps attached. The skirts worn over the jackets were a distinctive clothing style of the Tang dynasty's women. Under the Tang dynasty influence, the skirts in Silla were similarly worn at chest-level and were tied with long ribbons. The qixiong ruqun with shoulder straps was also worn in China, but they appeared to have been rarely used in China during the Tang dynasty. When Balhae established peaceful diplomatic relations with the Tang dynasty, Chinese culture was vigorously introduced by the Balhae court. Balhae also adopted the women's clothing of the Tang dynasty. Some excavated Balhae relics show that women in Balhae wore a narrow sleeved blouse with low cut neckline under a long skirt which was tied above the bust, which is a typical form of clothing style of Tang dynasty. Other relics also show the ornamental differences between the Balhae and Tang dynasty women in the use of different types of shawl.

This form of high-waisted skirt which ties to the chest can still be seen in the chima worn in the modern days Korean women's hanbok. It is also likely that the current women's hanbok has been derived from the Tang dynasty's high-waisted skirt with a short ru or from a later revival of the Tang dynasty fashion. Although there were influences from the previous dynasties, the clothing worn in Silla period was gradually altered during the Joseon dynasty until its forms became what is now known as hanbok. Nowadays women's hanbok is modelled after the Joseon aristocratic women's hanbok.

== Design and construction ==
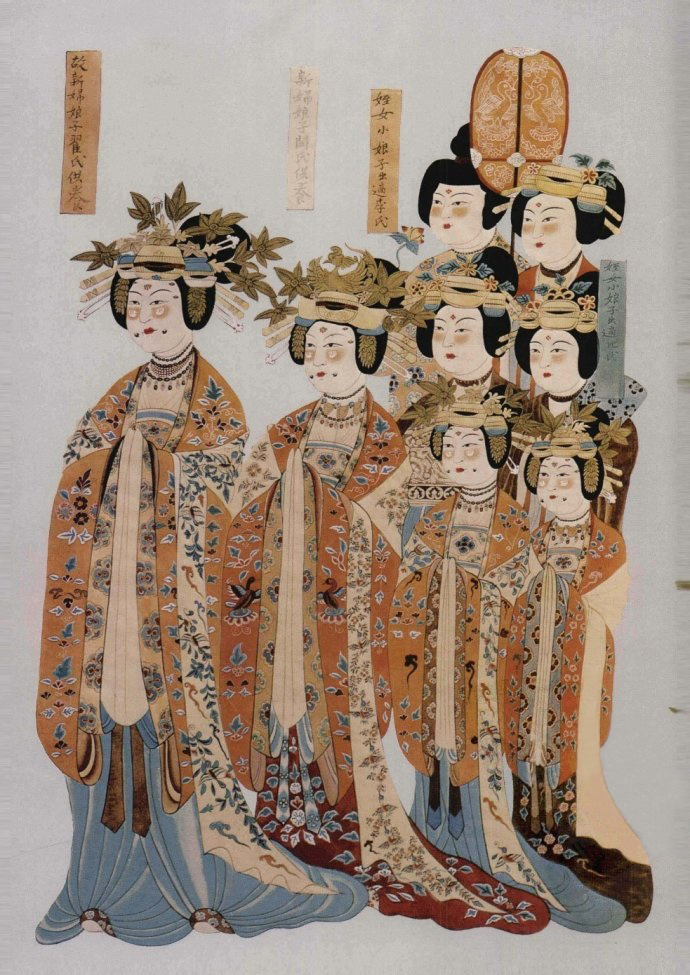
Buddhist donors in T'ang costume, Mo-kao Cave

Tang dynasty was a dynasty with a prosperous economy and relatively open social fashion. Its costumes tended to be bright, colourful, and diverse.

Qixiong ruqun is divided into two kinds:

1. Duijin qixiong ruqun (parallel collar type) - Duijin qixiong ruqun was and is generally more widely used.
2. Jiaoling Qixiong ruqun (crossed collar type).

=== Composition of Qixiong ruqun ===
Qixiong Ruqun is a style of ruqun. Ruqun consists of a ru (襦) and a skirt (裙; qun; also known as 裳; Chang), it is a typical upper and lower garment system. Because it must match the Qixiong skirt that was worn, the ru were usually very short. The patterns on clothes also had different requirements according to the characteristics of different dynasties, for example, flowers and plants were often used as patterns in Tang dynasty.

=== Qixiong ruqun accessories ===
==== Hezi (诃子) ====
The hezi is a corset-like garment that is attributed to Yang Guifei. The hezi is tied from the back to the front, and the lower part has a rope so that the waist part of the skirt can be tied at the same time. This accessory bears resemblance to the Qing dynasty Dudou (肚兜). Hezi is worn in the Tang dynasty, Song dynasty and Ming dynasty. Hezi can be seen in ancient Chinese frescoes and cultural relics, for example, the famous Dunhuang (敦煌) Mural.

==== Pibo (披帛) ====
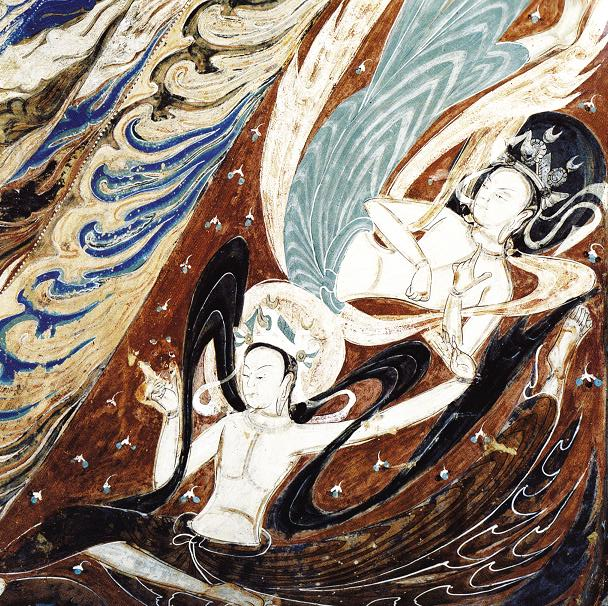
Dunhuang mural flying apsarasa

Pibo is often used as decoration for qixiong ruqun. Pibo evolved from a long shawl, and later gradually became a ribbon worn over the arms, typical costume of ancient Chinese ladies. Pibo often appears in the murals of Sui dynasty and most commonly in Tang dynasty. It is made of silver or gold chiffon, one end of which is fixed on the belt of the half arm then draped over the shoulder and wound around the arms. There are two kinds of pibo: one type of banner is broader and shorter, which is mostly used by married women. Another can reach more than two meters in length, primarily used by unmarried women. Women's clothing styles in the middle and late Tang dynasty tended to be more and more loose and elegant, so most of them are decorated with pibo. It is a type of decoration that influenced the dupatta in India.

==== Daxiushan (大袖衫) ====
Daxiushan is also used to match the dress with the skirt. In ancient times, qixiong ruqun with a daxiushan could be worn as a formal dress. The material of daxiushan upper garment is compared commonly flimsy. Its lace-up position is located in the lower part of clothing. This kind of dress can be seen in the Tang dynasty cultural relics silk painting "court ladies adorning their hair with flowers", this work is from Zhou Fang, who was a very influential painter in the middle Tang dynasty. The cuff of daxiushan upper garment has 4.37 feet above commonly. Many costumes can be used with daxiushan, which is commonly seen with narrow-sleeved, straight-sleeved and wide-sleeved blouses (ru).

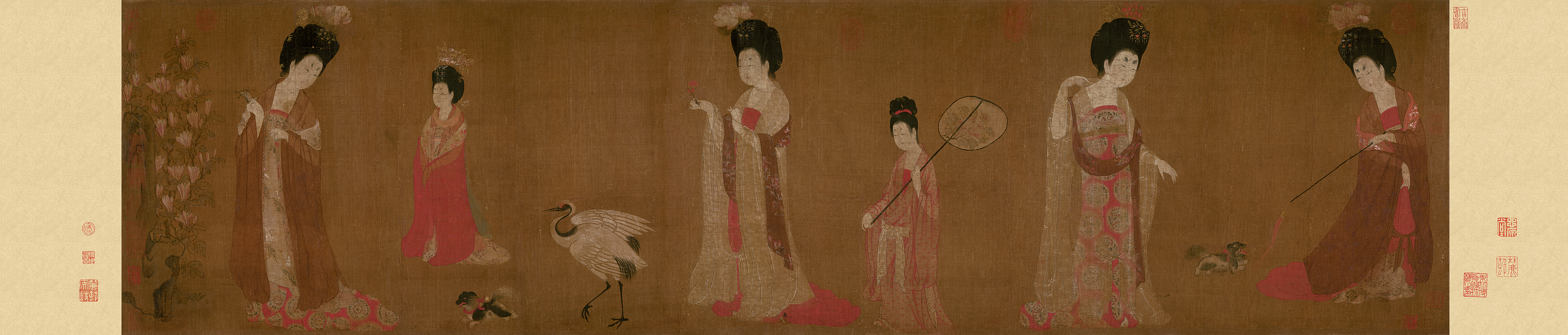
court ladies adorning their hair with flowers

== Other depictions ==
=== Chinese paintings of later centuries ===
The qixiong ruqun and/or qixiong ruqun-style clothing continued to be depicted in the paintings and/or illustrations of the Ming dynasty and Qing dynasty.

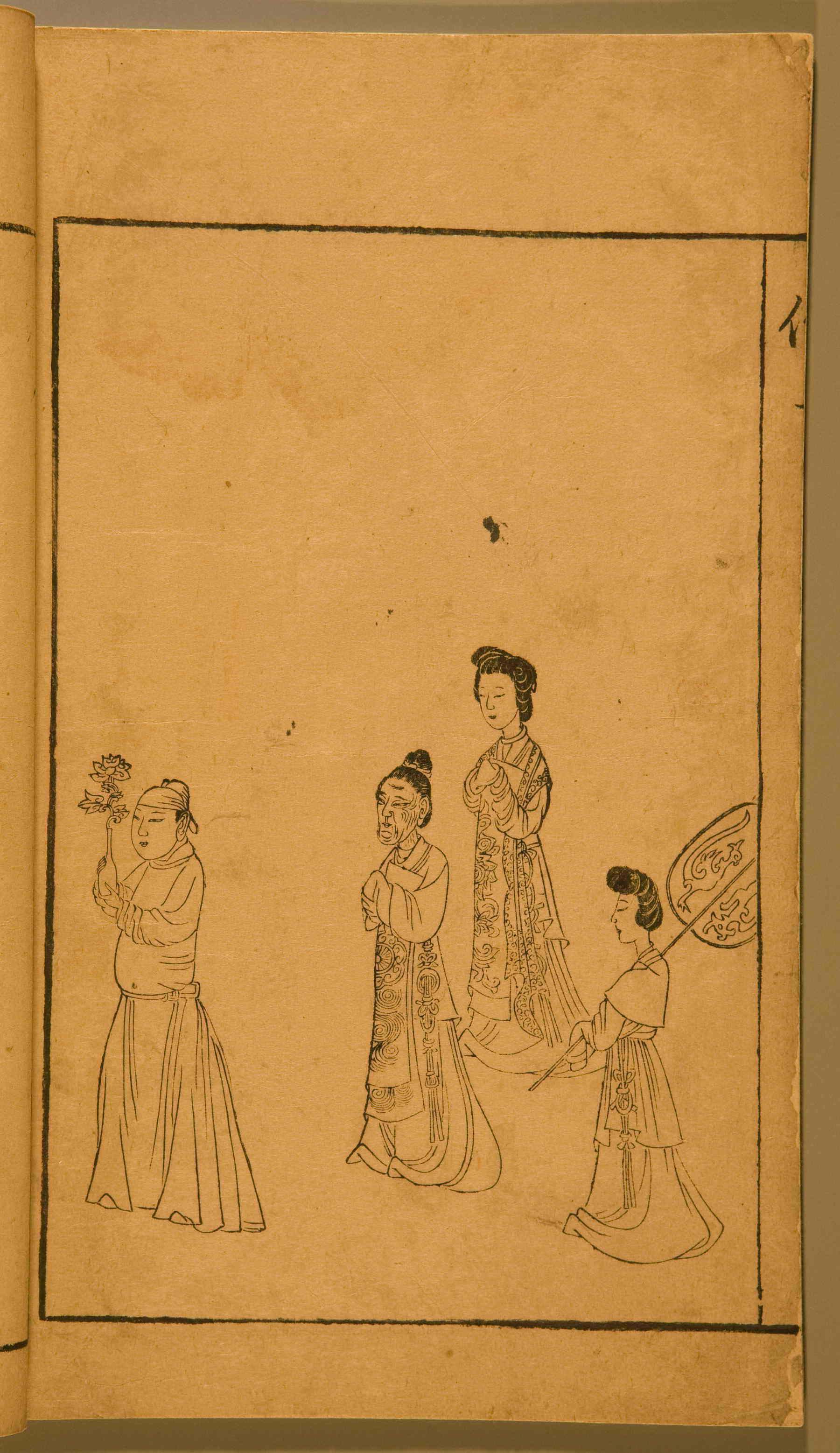
llustration by Chen Hongshou, late Ming dynasty.

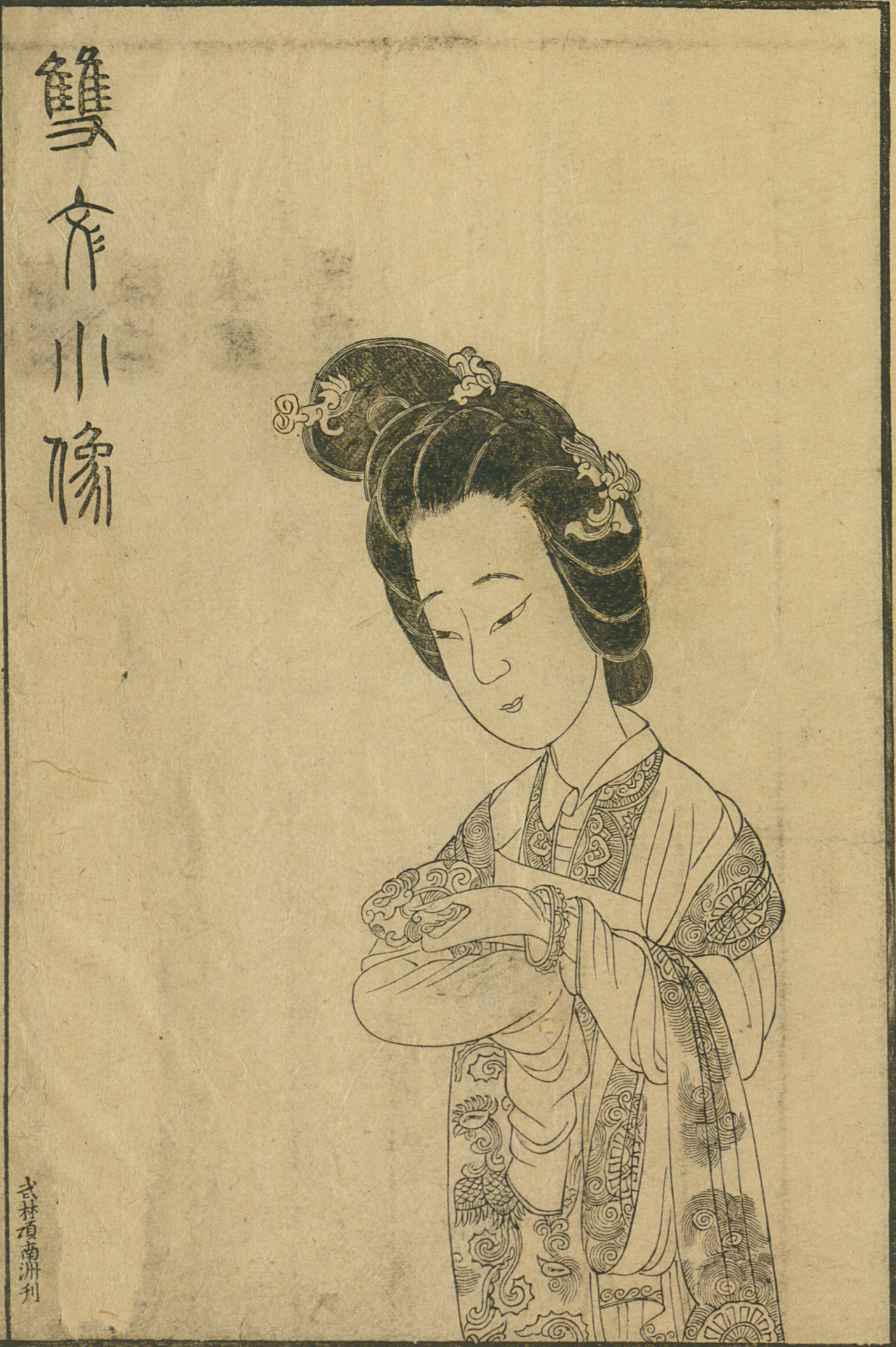
Illustration by Chen Hongshou, late Ming dynasty.

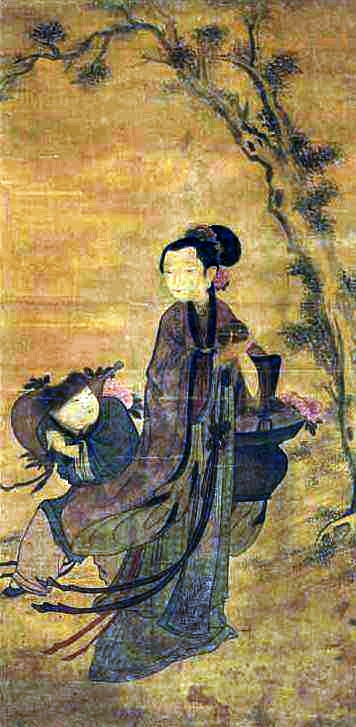
Magu (the goddess of flowers), Qing dynasty painting.

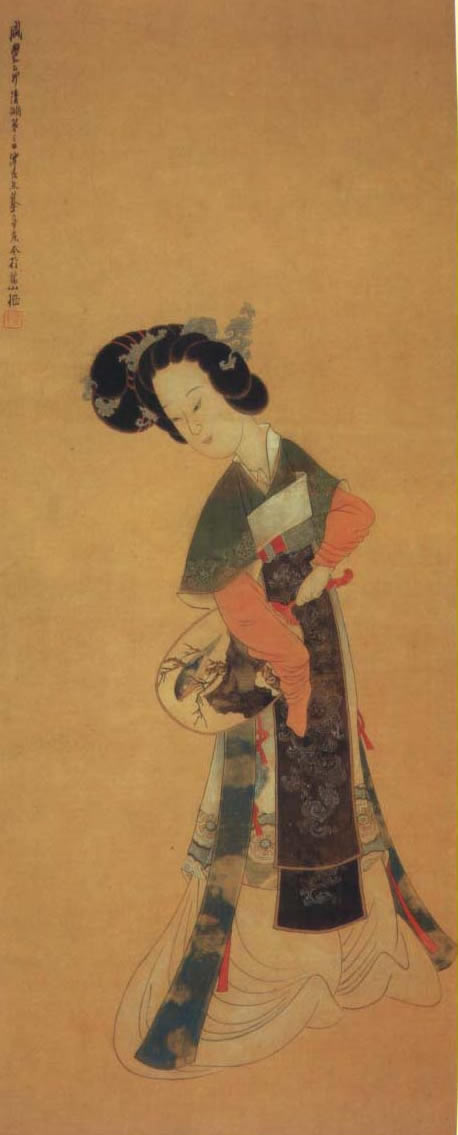
Painting by late Qing dynasty painting, Ren Xiong.

=== Entertainment ===
Qixiong ruqun and/or qixiong ruqun-style clothing is occasionally depicted in the costumes worn by actors in Chinese television dramas, in movies, and other forms of entertainment. They are also sometimes depicted in Korean dramas.

==== Media depictions ====
Qixiong ruqun has been depicted in films and television series, including Curse of the Golden Flower (2006), Jumong (2006), Queen Seondeok (2009), The Empress of China (2014), Wu Xin: The Monster Killer (2015), The Story of Minglan (2018), The Longest Day in Chang'an (2019), The Untamed (2019), Court Lady (2021) and The Long Ballad (2021).

== See also ==
- Fashion in Liao dynasty
- Hanfu movement
- Hanfu
- Daxiushan
