= Top surgery =

Top surgery refers to the surgical procedures on the breasts:

- Mammaplasty
  - Breast augmentation
  - Breast reduction
- Mastectomy
- Gender-affirming surgery
  - Masculinizing surgery, which may include bilateral mastectomy and chest reconstruction
  - Feminizing surgery, which may include breast augmentation

== See also ==
- Bottom surgery
