= Bandeau =

Strapless form of brassiere or swimsuit top

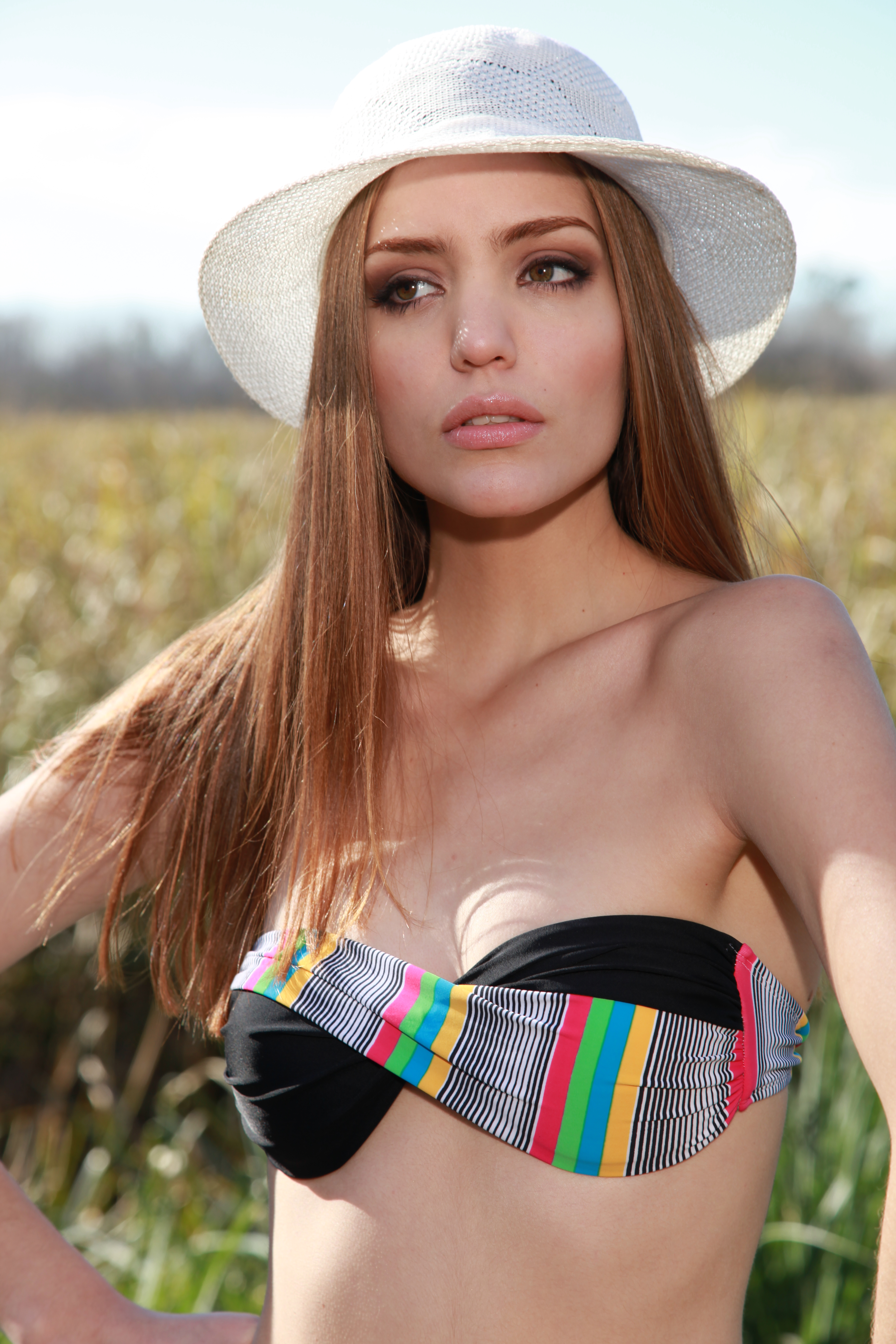
Woman wearing a bandeau bikini top

A bandeau (UK: /ˈbandəʊ/ US: /ˈbændəʊ/; pl. bandeaux; diminutive of the French word bande meaning 'strip') is a garment comprising, in appearance, a strip of cloth. Today, the term frequently refers to a garment that wraps around a woman's breasts. It is usually part of a bikini in sports or swimsuit. It is similar to a tube top, but narrower. It is usually strapless, sleeveless, and off the shoulder. Bandeaux are commonly made from elastic material to stop them from slipping down, or are tied or pinned at the back or front. In the first half of the 20th century, a "bandeau" was a narrow band worn by women to bind the hair, or as part of a headdress.

== Contemporary uses ==
=== Modern swimwear ===
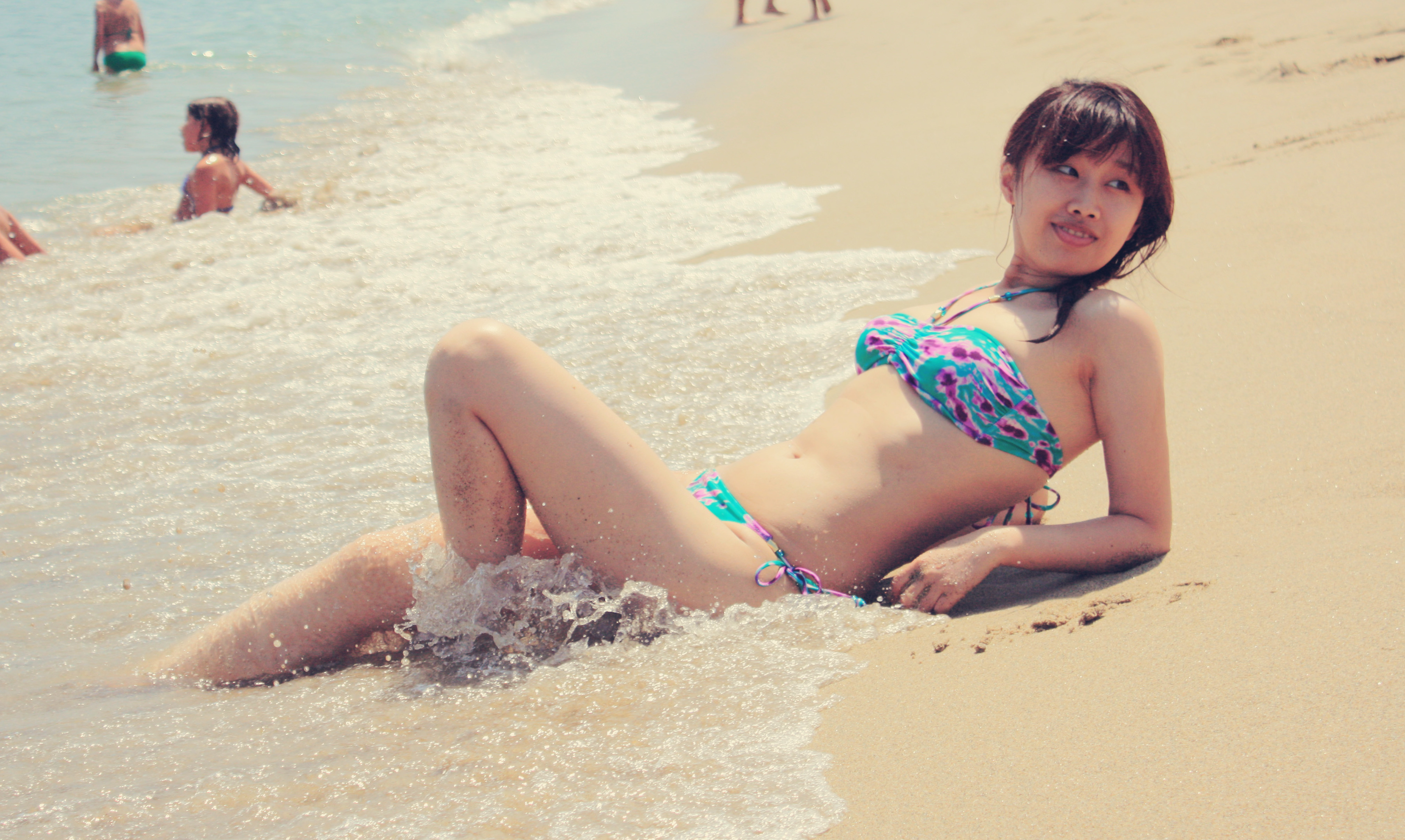
Bandeau bikini with halter strap

The bandeau emerged as the top part of a two-piece swimsuit during the 1940s. In the 1950s the bandeau incorporated foundation so as to structure the contours of the body, while still retaining a relatively simple circle or band shape, emphasizing the bare midriff. Another variation of bandeau is a one-piece bandeau swimsuit that covers the mid-section of the body. Its popularity in swimwear declined during the string bikini era, but it reappeared in the 1980s, especially with Spandex and other stretch fabric blends. Side stays, v-wire in the center front, O-rings, and the twisted top are popular design elements.

In modern sports and swimwear, a bandeau is a strapless garment worn around a woman's breasts. It may be fastened in the front or back or be sufficiently elastic so as not to need a fastener at all. A bandeau may come with a detachable halter strap for extra support. A strapless bandeau, or tube top, was also worn as casual wear and sports wear starting in the 1970s, and is sometimes worn as part of a sportswear ensemble.

=== In formal wear ===
Actress Halle Berry wore a pink bandeau with matching pants to the 2000 MTV Movie Awards, fueling the trend of wearing a bandeau top as an out-of-home dress. Miley Cyrus also wore a cropped black bandeau top with high waisted pants at the 2014 MTV Video Music Awards. Zendaya wore a red midriff baring bandeau outfit before winning the Fashion Icon award at the 2021 CFDA Awards.

== History ==
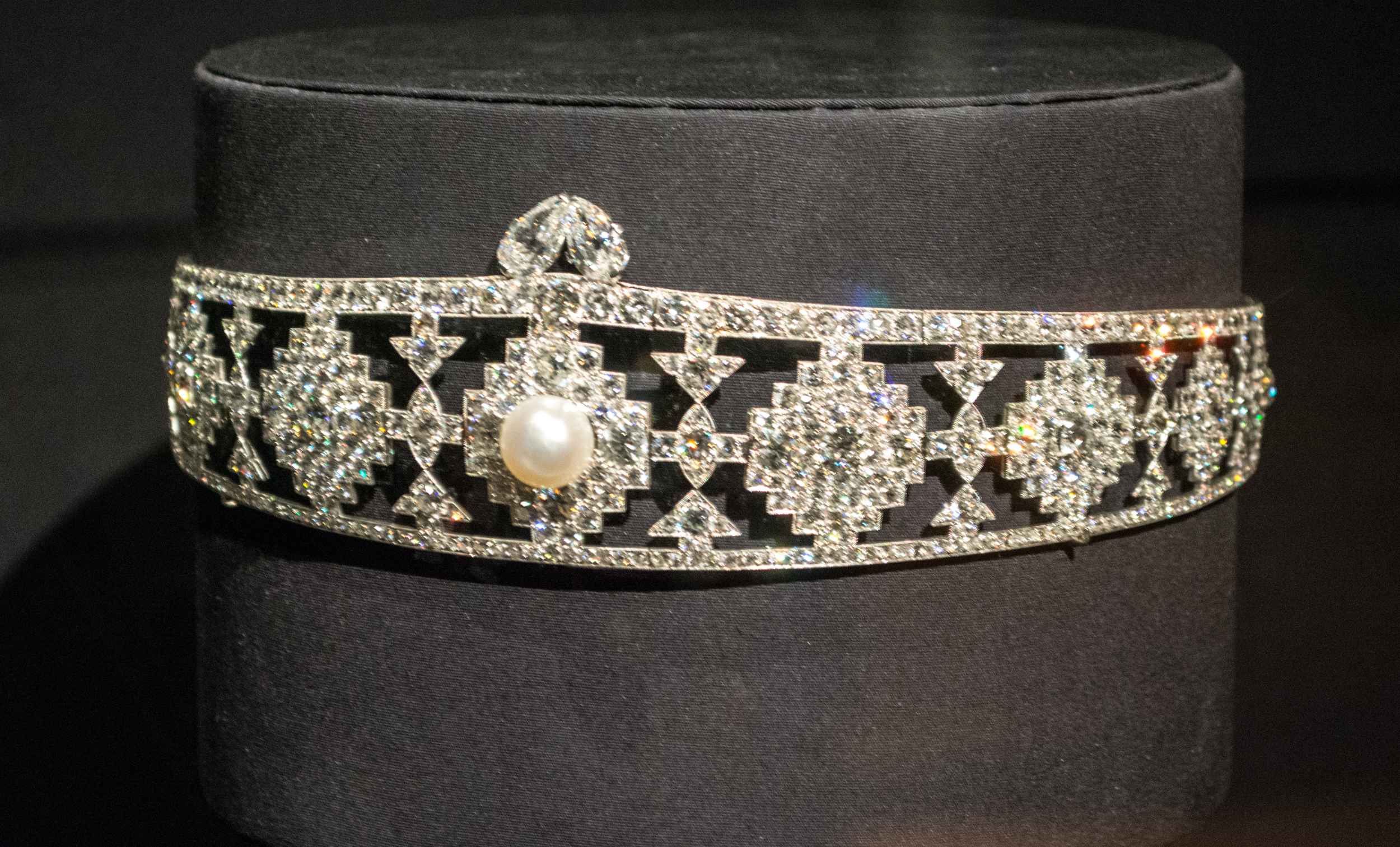
A 1924 Cartier bandeau made of natural pearls, diamonds, and platinum. A style of a tiara, which perched atop the hair, was adapted into this new form, mimicking the cloth bandeau fashionable women wore around the forehead.

=== In antiquity ===
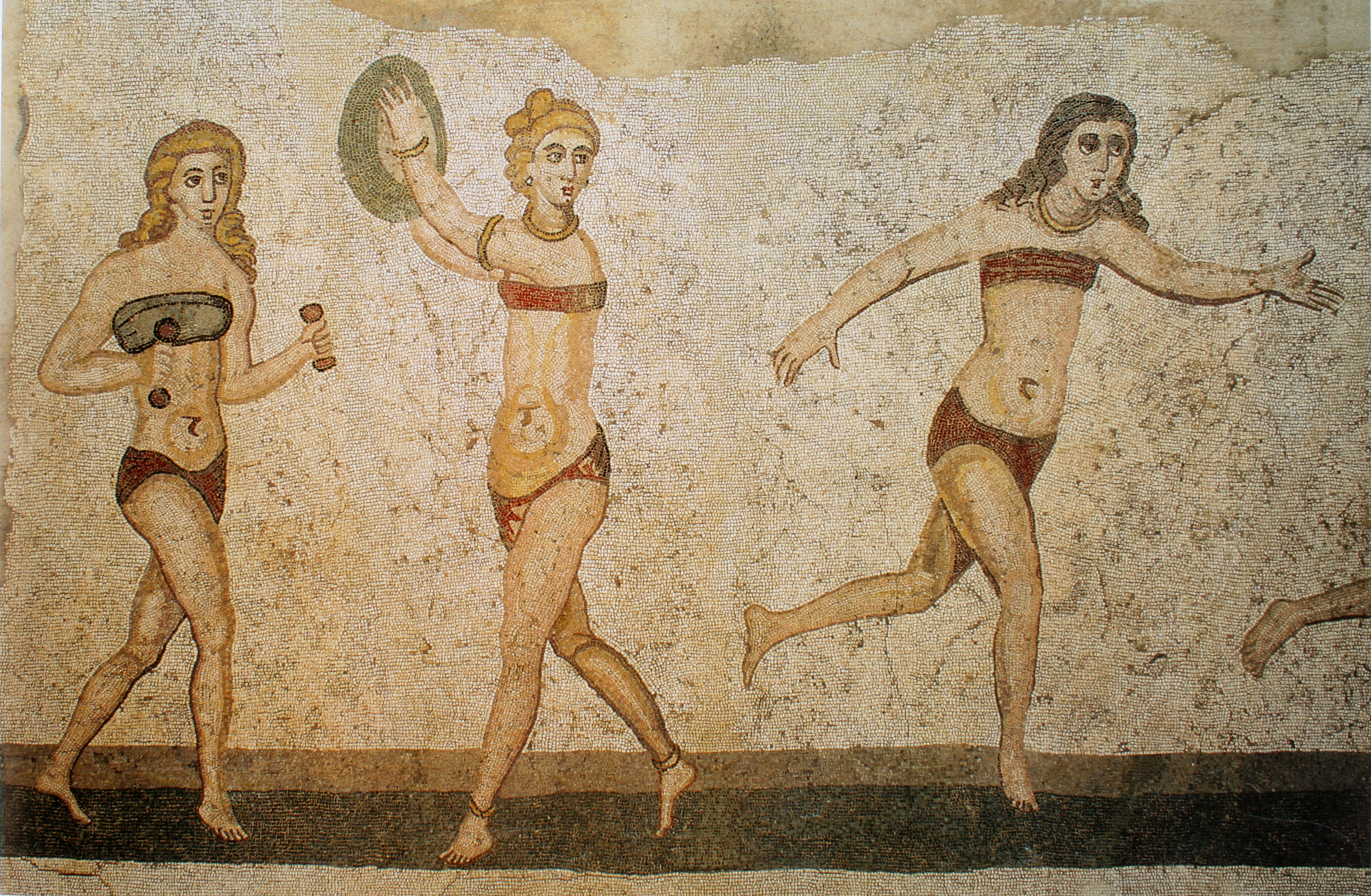
An ancient Roman Villa Romana del Casale (A.D. 286–305) mosaic mural in Sicily depicts some earlier bandeaux.

Wearing a bandeau to support a woman's breasts may date back to ancient Greece, where they were called apodesmos (Greek: ἀπόδεσμος), later stēthodesmē (Gr: στηθοδέσμη), mastodesmos (Gr: μαστόδεσμος) and mastodeton (Gr: μαστόδετον), all meaning "breast-band". It consisted of a band of wool or linen that was wrapped across the breasts and tied or pinned at the back.

As a silhouette the bandeau was also worn in Roman times. Archaeologist James Mellaart described the earliest bandeau-like costume in Çatalhöyük, Anatolia in the Chalcolithic era (around 5600 BC), where a mother goddess is depicted astride two leopards wearing a costume somewhat like a modern bandeau-style bikini. In the Greco-Roman world, women athletes wearing two-piece garments were depicted on urns and paintings dating back to 1400 BC.

In the floor of Coronation of the Winner hall of Villa Romana del Casale, a Roman villa in Sicily that dates from the Diocletian period (286–305 AD), mosaics depict young women wearing bandeau-like garments while exercising. The mosaic features ten maidens who have been anachronistically dubbed the "Bikini Girls". Other Roman archaeological finds depict the goddess Venus in a similar garment. In Pompeii, depictions of Venus wearing a bikini were discovered in the Casa della Venere, in the tablinum of the House of Julia Felix, and in an atrium garden of Via Dell'Abbondanza.

=== Brassiere ===
In the 1920s the term was applied to a simply shaped brassiere, usually of a soft fabric and delicate trimmings providing little support or shaping. The design was patented in 1916 in the United States by Edgar Guggenheim. It was sometimes made from an elastic material to flatten or suppress the breasts in the style of the period. When the "boyish" silhouette went out of fashion, the word "brassiere" or later "bra" became the term for more shapely support garments.

== Religious habits ==
The term bandeau also refers to the thin headband traditionally worn—until recently—underneath and supporting the veil by the nuns of many Catholic religious institutes. Together with the wimple (which covers the cheeks and neck) and the white coif to which it would be attached, it was the common headdress of a respectable woman in Medieval and Renaissance Europe.

== Variations and related clothing ==
- In pre-Islamic times, women on the Indonesian island of Bali, who in daily life would normally go topless, would wear a bandeau called a sabuk when visiting temples or attending important ceremonies. The rest of Indonesia refer to the garment as kemben.
- Sarashi are sometimes used by Japanese women to bind the breasts.

== See also ==
- List of bra designs
- Sarashi
