= Sarashi =

Japanese bleached cloth

A sarashi (晒し, "bleached cloth") is a kind of white cloth, usually cotton, or less commonly linen, used to make various garments in Japan, such as juban (a kind of under-kimono), fundoshi, or tenugui. A length of sarashi may be wrapped around the body under a kimono as a haramaki, or around the chest to bind the breasts.

== See also ==
- Bandeau
- Breast binding
- Girdle § Undergarment
- Haramaki
