= Tube top =

Shoulderless, sleeveless women's garment

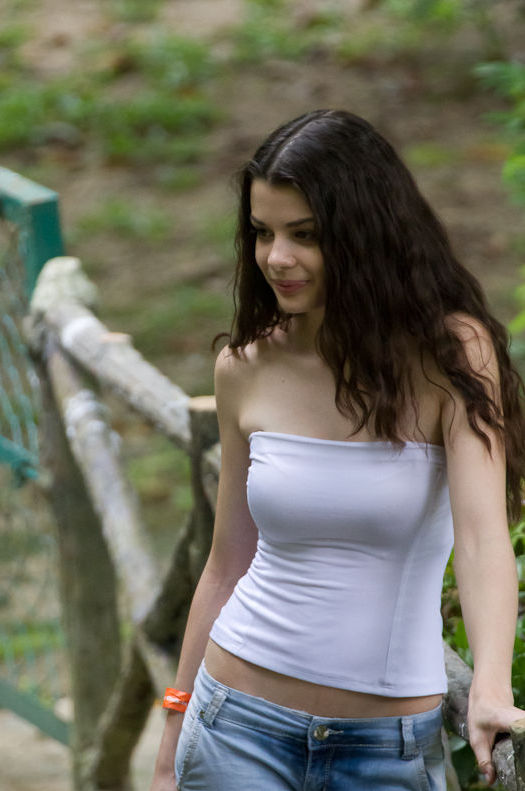
A woman wearing a white tube top

A tube top is a shoulderless, sleeveless garment primarily worn by women that wraps around the upper torso. It is generally tight over the breasts, and usually uses elastic bands at its top and bottom to prevent it from falling. The tube top's precursor was a beachwear or informal summer garment worn by young girls in the 1950s that became more widely popular in the 1970s and returned to popularity in the 1990s and 2000s.

In 2012, Iranian-Jewish fashion designer Elie Tahari claimed that he helped popularize the tube top after his arrival in New York in 1971. The original tube tops, as spotted by Tahari in a New York factory run by Murray Kleid, were elasticated gauze tubes reportedly produced through a factory manufacturing error. Murray ran with this product for years, and eventually Tahari bought tubes from Kleid, later setting up his own factory to mass produce tube tops to meet widespread demand.

== Dress code controversies ==
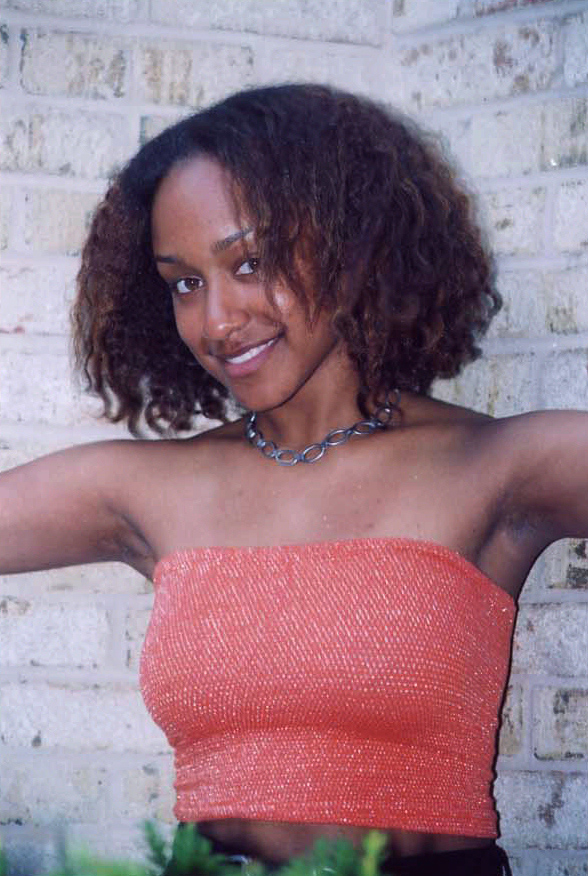
A woman wearing a tube top

In the 2010s, tube tops were banned by some schools (e.g., one New Jersey school's dress code banned tube tops as "too 'distracting' for the eighth grade boys"). In 2018, opponents of these types of clothing bans argued that they are a "form of body shaming" on women and should not be used; in one San Francisco Bay area school district, based on advice from the National Organization for Women, tube tops (along with miniskirts and other formerly disallowed items) are being permitted again.

== See also ==
- Bandeau
- Strapless dress
