= Strapless dress =

Type of dress

A strapless dress or top is a garment that stays put around the upper body without shoulder straps or other visible means of support. It is usually supported by an internal corset and/or brassiere, with the tightness of the bodice preventing the dress from slipping out of position.

== History ==
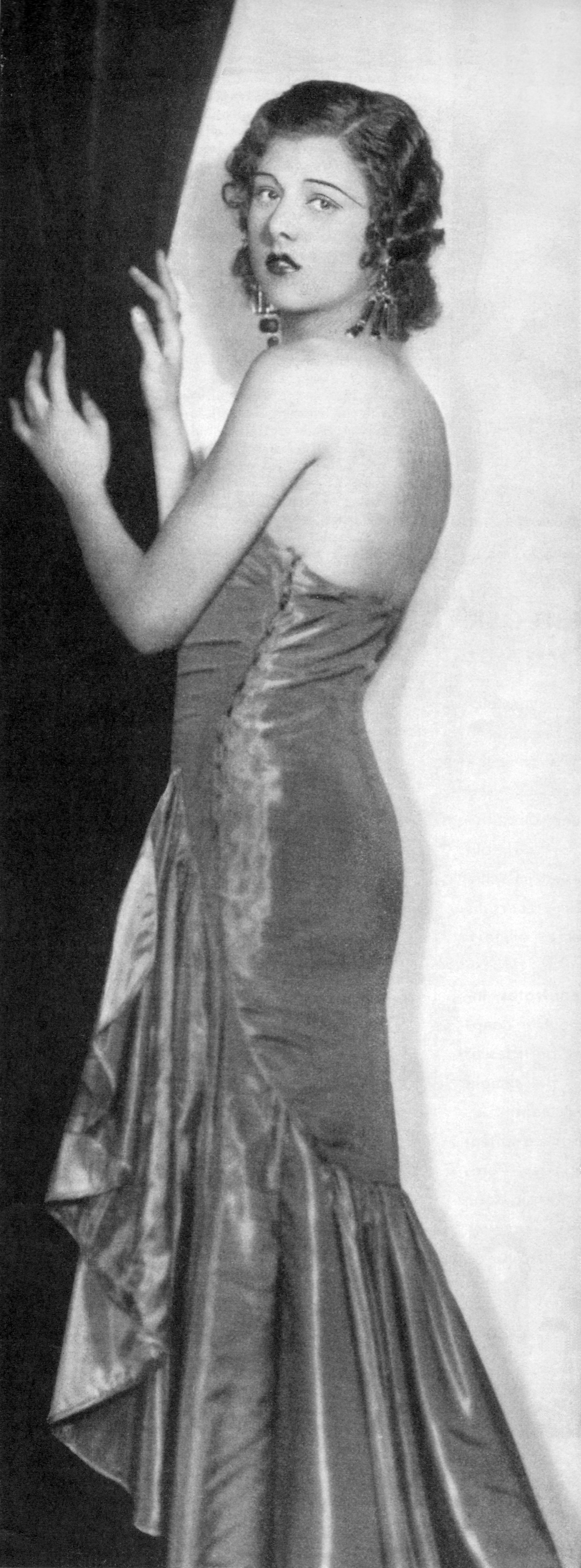
Actress Libby Holman in an early strapless dress (1930)

=== 1930s to 1980s ===
According to Richard Martin and Harold Koda, the modern strapless dress first appeared in the 1930s, when it was popularised by designers such as Mainbocher and from the late 1940s, Christian Dior. The July 18, 1938, issue of Life claimed that the "absolutely strapless, sleeveless evening dress" was a 1937–38 invention. However, that was predated in 1930 by the actress Libby Holman, who had been photographed in an apparently strapless dress that year. Holman became associated with the strapless dress and is regularly credited with inventing it, or at least being one of its first high-profile wearers.

In 1934, Mainbocher produced his first strapless gown, a black satin design which has been described as the first strapless evening dress. Along with Holman and Mainbocher, the heiress Brenda Frazier is also credited with popularising the style when she wore a strapless debutante dress for her debut and famously appeared in it on the November 14, 1938, cover of Life.

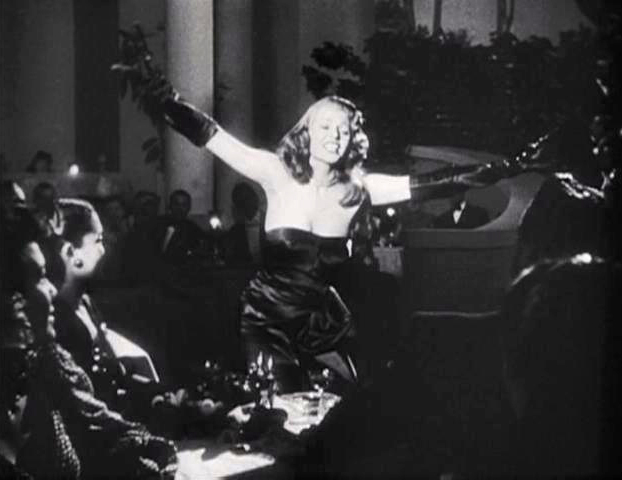
Rita Hayworth in Gilda (1946)

Strapless dresses remained popular after the Second World War, with the style sometimes being described as the "naked look". One of the most famous strapless dresses of this period was the black satin gown worn by Rita Hayworth for a song and dance routine in Gilda. Hayworth's performance demonstrated to viewers that strapless dresses could be secure enough to move around and dance in without risk of indecent exposure. Despite this, more conservative customers might add shoulder straps to their new strapless dresses. The style was also problematic for those who objected to its perceived immodesty. During the 1940s and 1950s, Catholic campaigners in the United States protested against "immodest" clothing, including two-piece and strapless swimsuits and dresses. In 1954, the United States Army tried to ban Army wives and daughters in Germany from wearing shorts, jeans, and strapless dresses, "except at appropriate social functions."

During the 1950s, notable strapless dress designers included Madame Grès, whose flowing Grecian dresses were mounted upon custom-designed interior corsets by Alice Cadolle.

In the 1970s, Halston designed an unstructured strapless dress. The knitted tube top was worn as a casual strapless option, and by the 1980s, strapless dresses were made in stretchy, elastic fabrics which did not require boning or interior structure.

=== 1990s onwards ===
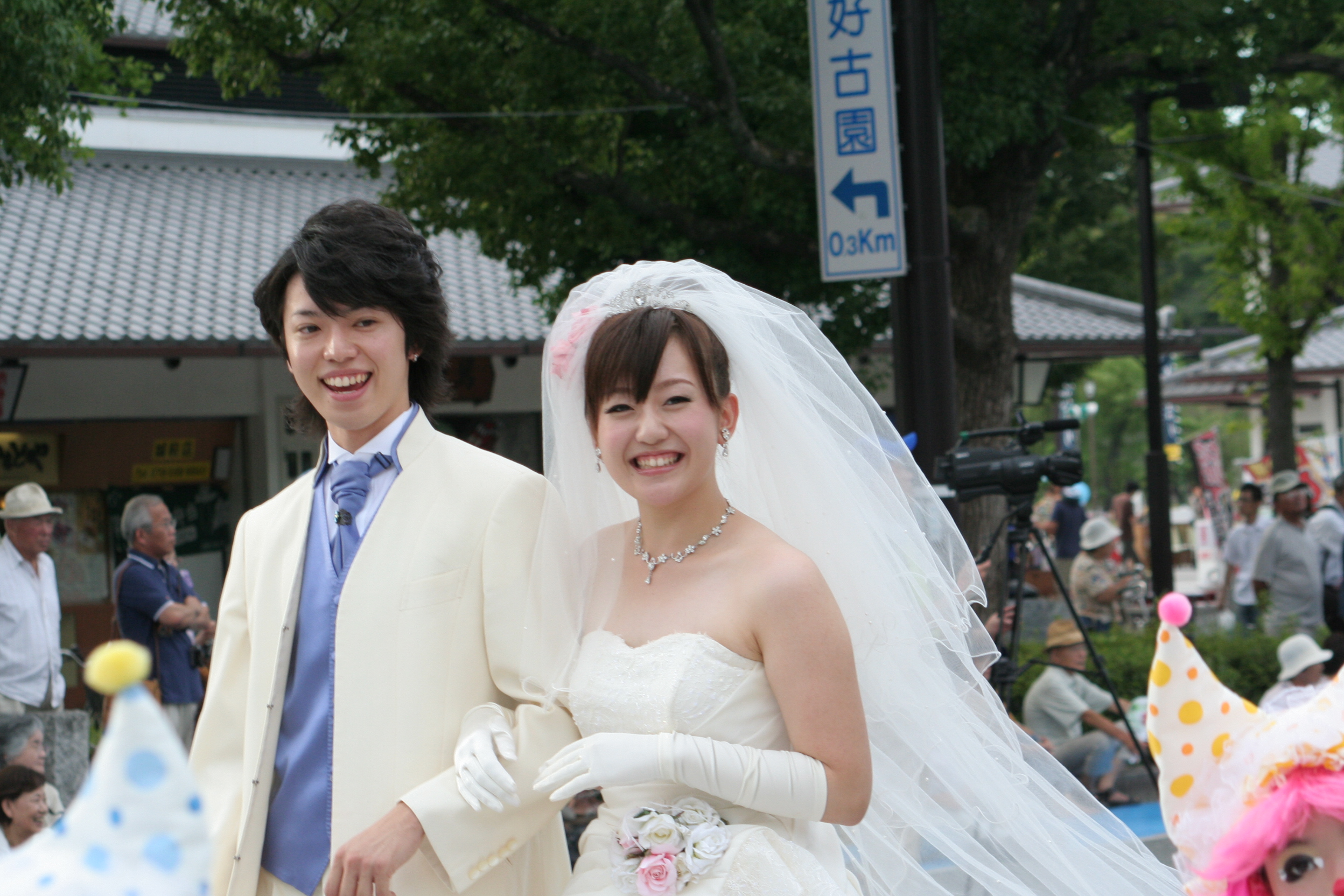
Japanese bride wearing a strapless dress, 2010

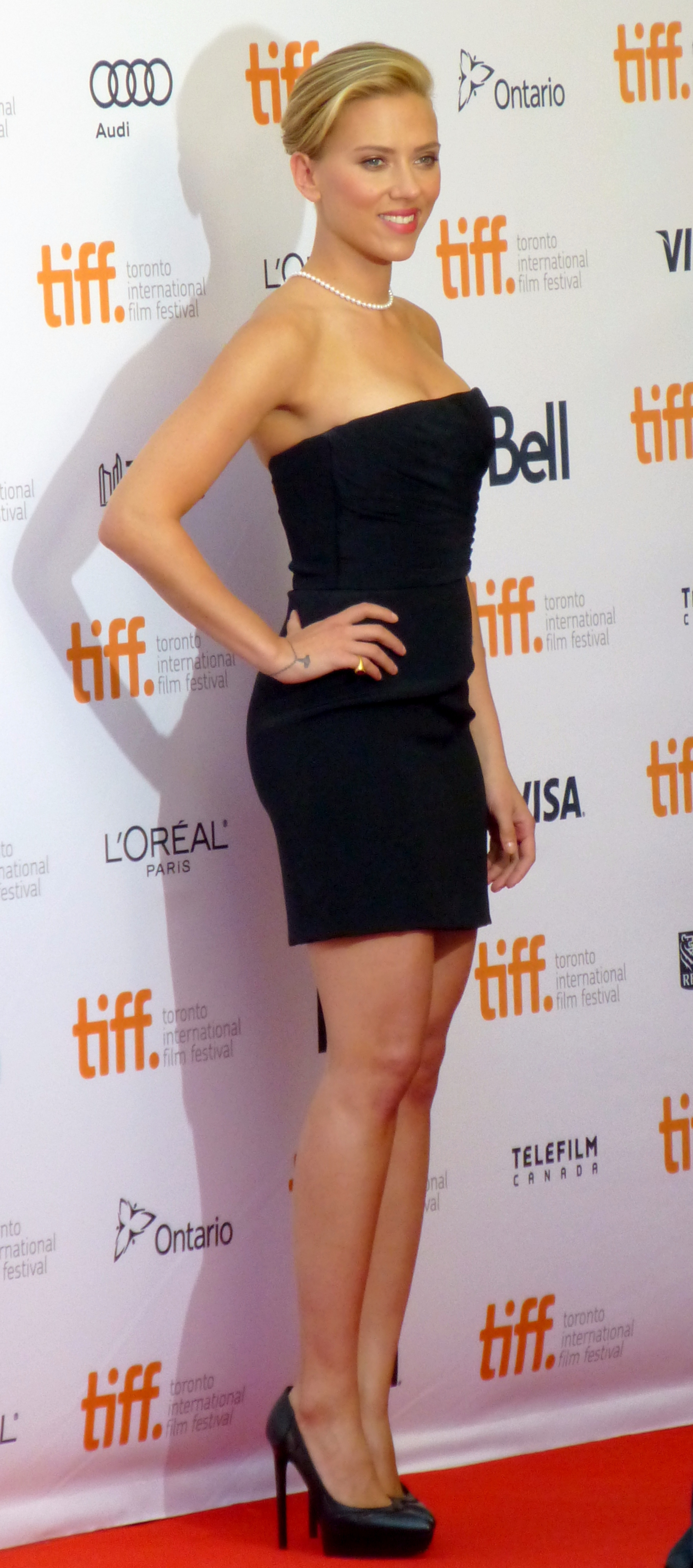
Actress Scarlett Johansson wearing a short strapless dress, 2013

In 2012, the strapless dress was described as the most widely requested style for Western wedding dresses. Vera Wang is sometimes credited with introducing this style of bridal dress in the first decade of the 21st century, although strapless dresses were an increasingly valid option from the 1990s onwards with the growing popularity of formal civil weddings from the 1990s. However, for religious weddings, strapless and shoulder-baring styles are potentially controversial, and despite the popularity of the strapless wedding dress it is considered by some to be a "rejection of the virginal ideal".

The strapless dress is also a very popular style for red carpet fashion.

== Social and cultural context ==
Since their introduction, strapless garments have proved problematic in many contexts. In the early 21st century, many schools and workplaces specifically forbid strapless garments as part of their dress code. An Adecco survey published in The Wall Street Journal in 2012 indicated that 72% of Americans thought strapless tops were inappropriate office wear.

=== Religious stances ===
Strapless garments may be singled out for particular censure by preachers and clerics. In 2005, a Muslim cleric declared strapless garments "satanic", along with other revealing garments such as miniskirts and see-through clothing. Spencer W. Kimball, the 12th President of the Church of Jesus Christ of Latter-day Saints (LDS church), declared that strapless gowns were neither righteous nor approved, and that no Latter-day Saint woman should wear one at any time, while other Latter-day Saints declared them an "abomination in the sight of the Lord". Such views may not necessarily reflect those of the majority of their associated religion, although a rule of thumb is that strapless garments are only acceptable in religious contexts, such as Catholic churches or Jewish bat mitzvahs, if the shoulders and arms are covered.
