= Haramaki =

Haramaki may refer to:

- Haramaki (armour), a type of Japanese chest armour
- Haramaki (clothing), items of Japanese clothing that cover the stomach
