= Iuka, Mississippi =

- City
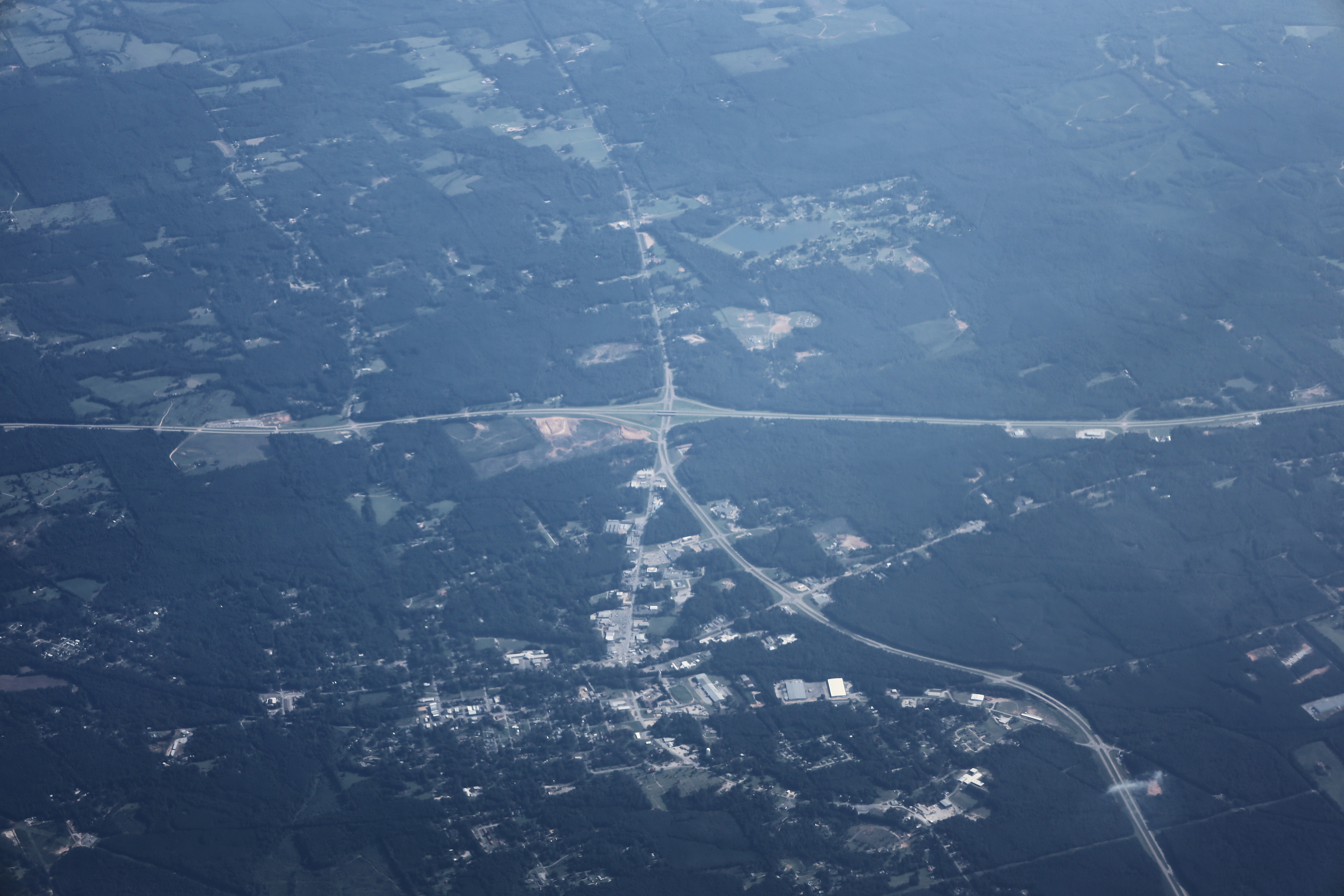
- Aerial image of Iuka

- Flag Seal

- Location of Iuka, Mississippi

- Location in the United States
- Coordinates: 34°48′28″N 88°11′52″W
- Country: United States
- State: Mississippi
- County: Tishomingo

Area
  - Total: 9.70 sq mi (25.12 km^{2})
  - Land: 9.70 sq mi (25.11 km^{2})
  - Water: 0.0039 sq mi (0.01 km^{2})
- Elevation: 548 ft (167 m)

Population (2020)
  - Total: 3,139
  - Density: 323.8/sq mi (125.03/km^{2})
- Time zone: UTC-6 (Central (CST))
  - Summer (DST): UTC-5 (CDT)
- ZIP code: 38852
- Area code: 662
- FIPS code: 28-35300
- GNIS feature ID: 2404773
- Website: iukams.com

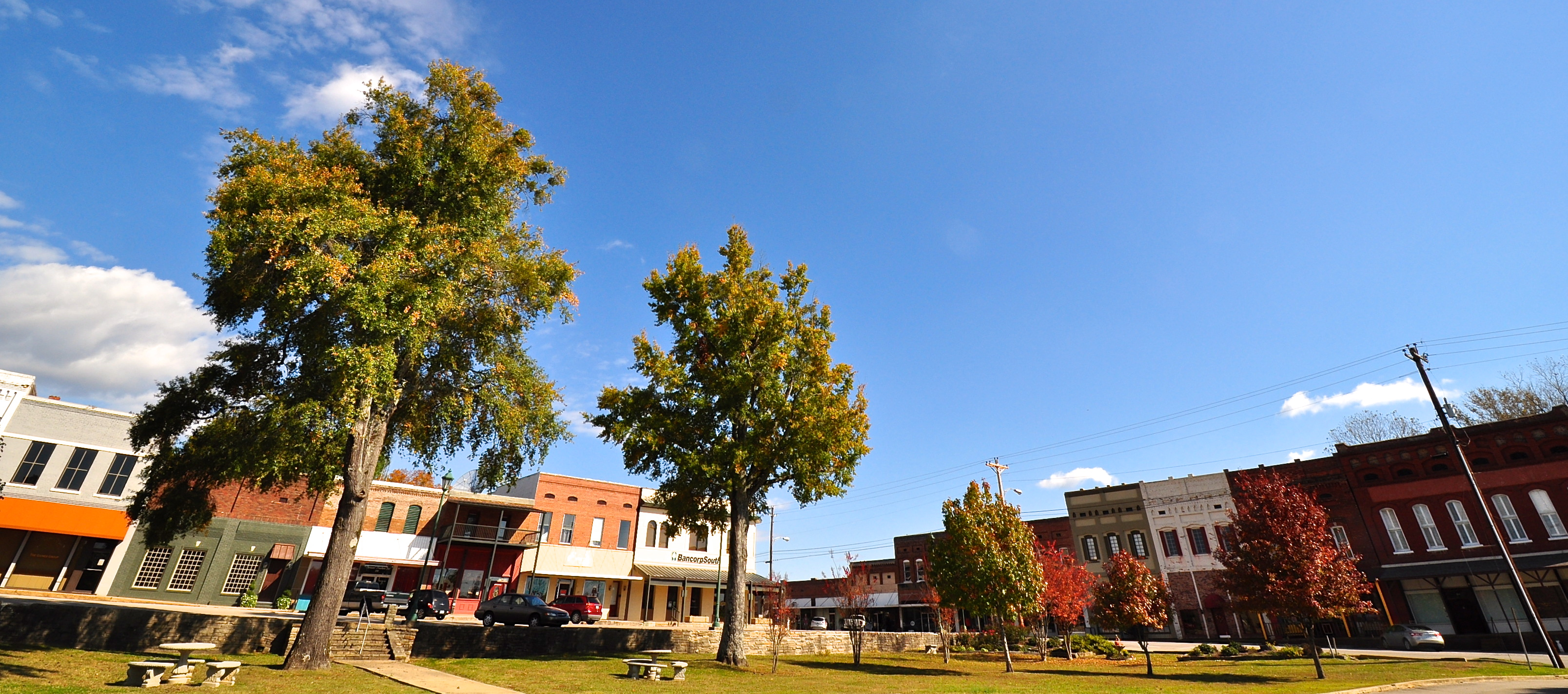
Downtown Iuka, 2013

Iuka (/aɪˈjuːkə/) is a city in and the county seat of Tishomingo County, Mississippi, United States. Its population was 3,139 at the 2020 census. Woodall Mountain, the highest point in Mississippi, is located just south of Iuka.

== History ==
Iuka is built on the site of a Chickasaw village that is thought to have been subordinate to the settlement at Underwood Village. The name "Iuka" comes from the name of one of the chiefs of the village. Iuka was founded by David Hubbard, a wagon train scout.

Euro-American settlers arrived with the Memphis and Charleston Railroad in 1857. Before the American Civil War, the town boasted an all-female college, a boys' military academy, and a fine hotel. The Civil War brought widespread devastation when a major engagement here occurred on September 19, 1862. The Battle of Iuka resulted in 1200 to 1500 killed or wounded. The dead Confederate soldiers were buried in a long trench that eventually became Shady Grove Cemetery.

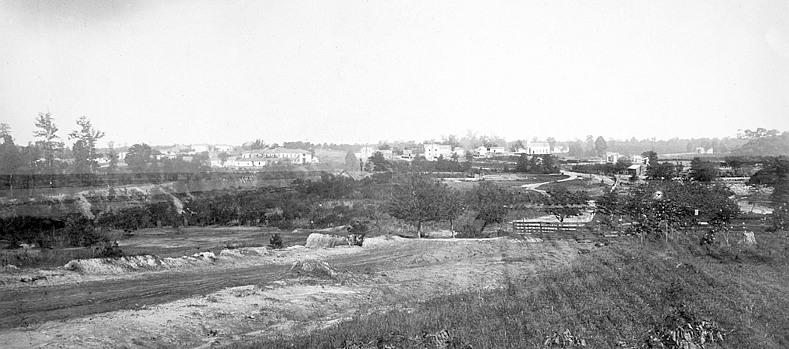
Iuka, circa 1865

The first normal school built in the former Confederacy after the Civil War, Iuka Normal Institute, was built here. However, the town did not return to prosperity for many years. The building of Pickwick Landing Dam and Pickwick Lake by the Tennessee Valley Authority brought activity back to the town.

In 1904, water from Iuka's mineral springs won first prize for the purest and best mineral water at the World's Fair in St. Louis.

== Geography ==
Iuka is located in northeast Mississippi. U.S. Route 72 runs through the southern part of the city from west to east, leading southeast 14 mi (23 km) to Cherokee, Alabama, and northwest 8 mi (13 km) to Burnsville. Mississippi Highway 25 runs to the west of downtown from south to north, leading north 16 mi (26 km) to Red Sulphur Springs, Tennessee, and south 13 mi (21 km) to Tishomingo.

According to the United States Census Bureau, the city has a total area of 9.7 square miles (25 km^{2}), all land.

=== Climate ===
Climate is characterized by relatively high temperatures and evenly distributed precipitation throughout the year. The Köppen Climate Classification subtype for this climate is "Cfa" (humid subtropical climate).

Climate data for Iuka, Mississippi
Month	Jan	Feb	Mar	Apr	May	Jun	Jul	Aug	Sep	Oct	Nov	Dec	Year
Mean daily maximum °F (°C)	49 (9)	54 (12)	62 (17)	72 (22)	79 (26)	86 (30)	89 (32)	90 (32)	84 (29)	73 (23)	63 (17)	52 (11)	71 (22)
Mean daily minimum °F (°C)	27 (−3)	29 (−2)	37 (3)	44 (7)	54 (12)	62 (17)	66 (19)	65 (18)	57 (14)	44 (7)	37 (3)	29 (−2)	46 (8)
Average precipitation inches (mm)	5.3 (130)	5.1 (130)	5.9 (150)	5 (130)	5.9 (150)	4.2 (110)	4.2 (110)	4 (100)	4.2 (110)	3.6 (91)	5.5 (140)	6.8 (170)	59.7 (1,520)
Source: Weatherbase

== Demographics ==
Historical population
Census	Pop.	Note	%±
1880	845		—
1890	1,019		20.6%
1900	882		−13.4%
1910	1,221		38.4%
1920	1,306		7.0%
1930	1,441		10.3%
1940	1,664		15.5%
1950	1,527		−8.2%
1960	2,010		31.6%
1970	2,389		18.9%
1980	2,846		19.1%
1990	3,122		9.7%
2000	3,059		−2.0%
2010	3,028		−1.0%
2020	3,139		3.7%
U.S. Decennial Census

=== 2020 census ===
As of the 2020 census, Iuka had a population of 3,139. The median age was 43.5 years. 21.9% of residents were under the age of 18 and 24.7% were 65 years of age or older. For every 100 females, there were 87.1 males, and for every 100 females age 18 and over, there were 79.9 males age 18 and over.

0.0% of residents lived in urban areas, while 100.0% lived in rural areas.

There were 1,305 households in Iuka, including 727 families. Of all households, 28.4% had children under the age of 18 living in them. Of all households, 36.7% were married-couple households, 18.8% were households with a male householder and no spouse or partner present, and 39.0% were households with a female householder and no spouse or partner present. About 39.0% of all households were made up of individuals, and 19.7% had someone living alone who was 65 years of age or older.

There were 1,517 housing units, of which 14.0% were vacant. The homeowner vacancy rate was 2.1% and the rental vacancy rate was 5.0%.

Iuka racial composition as of the 2020 census
Race	Num.	Perc.
White (non-Hispanic)	2,734	87.1%
Black or African American (non-Hispanic)	188	5.99%
Native American	13	0.41%
Asian	8	0.25%
Other/Mixed	130	4.14%
Hispanic or Latino	66	2.1%

=== 2000 census ===
As of the census of 2000, there were 3,059 people, 1,325 households, and 809 families residing in the city. The population density was 316.6 people per square mile (122.2 people/km^{2}). There were 1,550 housing units at an average density of 160.4 per square mile (61.9/km^{2}). The racial makeup of the city was 91.14% White, 7.09% African American, 0.23% Native American, 0.16% Asian, 0.59% from other races, and 0.78% from two or more races. Hispanic or Latino of any race were 1.21% of the population.

There were 1,325 households, out of which 25.0% had children under the age of 18 living with them, 44.8% were married couples living together, 13.4% had a female householder with no husband present, and 38.9% were non-families. 36.9% of all households were made up of individuals, and 17.4% had someone living alone who was 65 years of age or older. The average household size was 2.13 and the average family size was 2.77.

In the city, the population was spread out, with 19.5% under the age of 18, 7.4% from 18 to 24, 23.4% from 25 to 44, 23.7% from 45 to 64, and 26.1% who were 65 years of age or older. The median age was 45 years. For every 100 females, there were 76.9 males. For every 100 females age 18 and over, there were 72.1 males.

The median income for a household in the city was $24,082, and the median income for a family was $36,863. Males had a median income of $30,449 versus $20,658 for females. The per capita income for the city was $17,261. About 16.0% of families and 20.4% of the population were below the poverty line, including 26.6% of those under age 18 and 15.4% of those age 65 or over.

== Economy ==
A major employer in Iuka's industrial sector is Alliant Techsystems, a major U.S. aerospace and defense contractor.

Iuka is home to the Apron Museum, the only museum in the United States dedicated to aprons.

== Parks and recreation ==
- J. P. Coleman State Park
- Mineral Springs Park
- Jaybird Park
- Iuka Dixie Youth Baseball Fields
- Iuka Softball Complex
- Iuka Youth Soccer Fields

== Education ==
- Tishomingo County High School
- Iuka Middle School
- Iuka Elementary School

== Media ==
=== Radio Stations ===
- WKZU "Kudzu 104.9"
- W278CL 103.5
- W226AJ 93.1
- WOWL "FUN 91.9"
- WADI 95.3 "The Bee"

=== TV Stations ===
- WRMG "TV-12"

== Infrastructure ==
=== Transportation ===
==== Highways ====
- U.S. Route 72
- Mississippi Highway 25

==== Railroads ====
- Norfolk Southern Railway
- Kansas City Southern Railway

==== Airports ====
- Iuka Airport

=== Healthcare ===
- North Mississippi Medical Center - Iuka

=== Libraries ===
- Iuka Public Library

== See also ==
- North Mississippi
- Tennessee–Tombigbee Waterway
- Rheta Grimsley Johnson
- Woodall Mountain
- Yellow Creek Nuclear Power Plant
