= Dudou =

Traditional Chinese garment

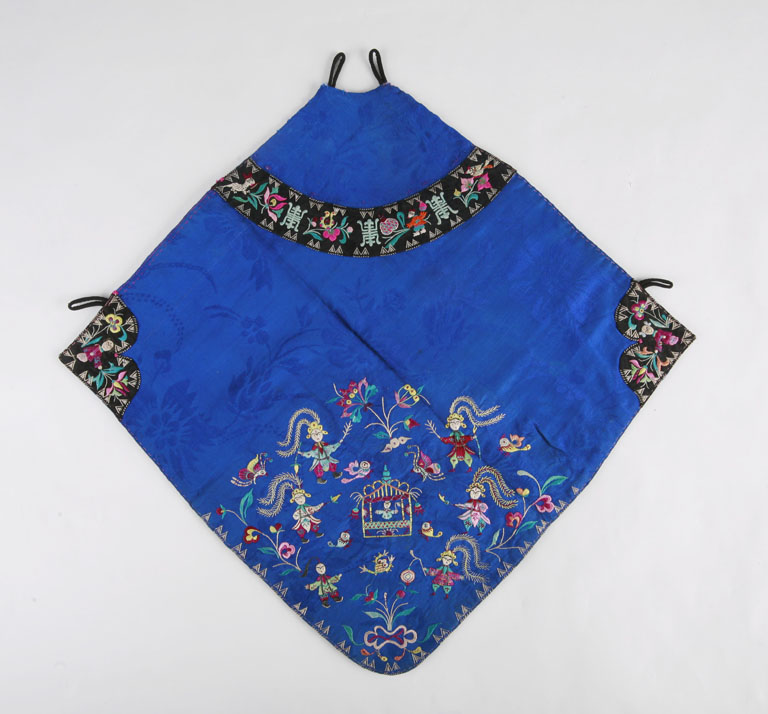
- A child's doudou from the early 20th century, missing its strings

Chinese name
- Chinese: 肚兜
- Literal meaning: belly wrap
Transcriptions
Standard Mandarin
- Hanyu Pinyin: dùdōu
- Wade–Giles: tu-tou

Doudu
- Chinese: 兜肚
- Literal meaning: [thing that] wraps the belly
Transcriptions
Standard Mandarin
- Hanyu Pinyin: dōudù
- Wade–Giles: tou-tu

Doudou
- Chinese: 兜兜
- Literal meaning: "wrappy" "little wrap"
Transcriptions
Standard Mandarin
- Hanyu Pinyin: dōudōu
- Wade–Giles: tou-tou

Mongolian name
- Mongolian Cyrillic: дүүдүү
- Mongolian script: ᠲᠦᠳᠥᠦ
Transcriptions
- SASM/GNC: duduu

Japanese name
- Kanji: 腹掛け
Transcriptions
- Romanization: haragake

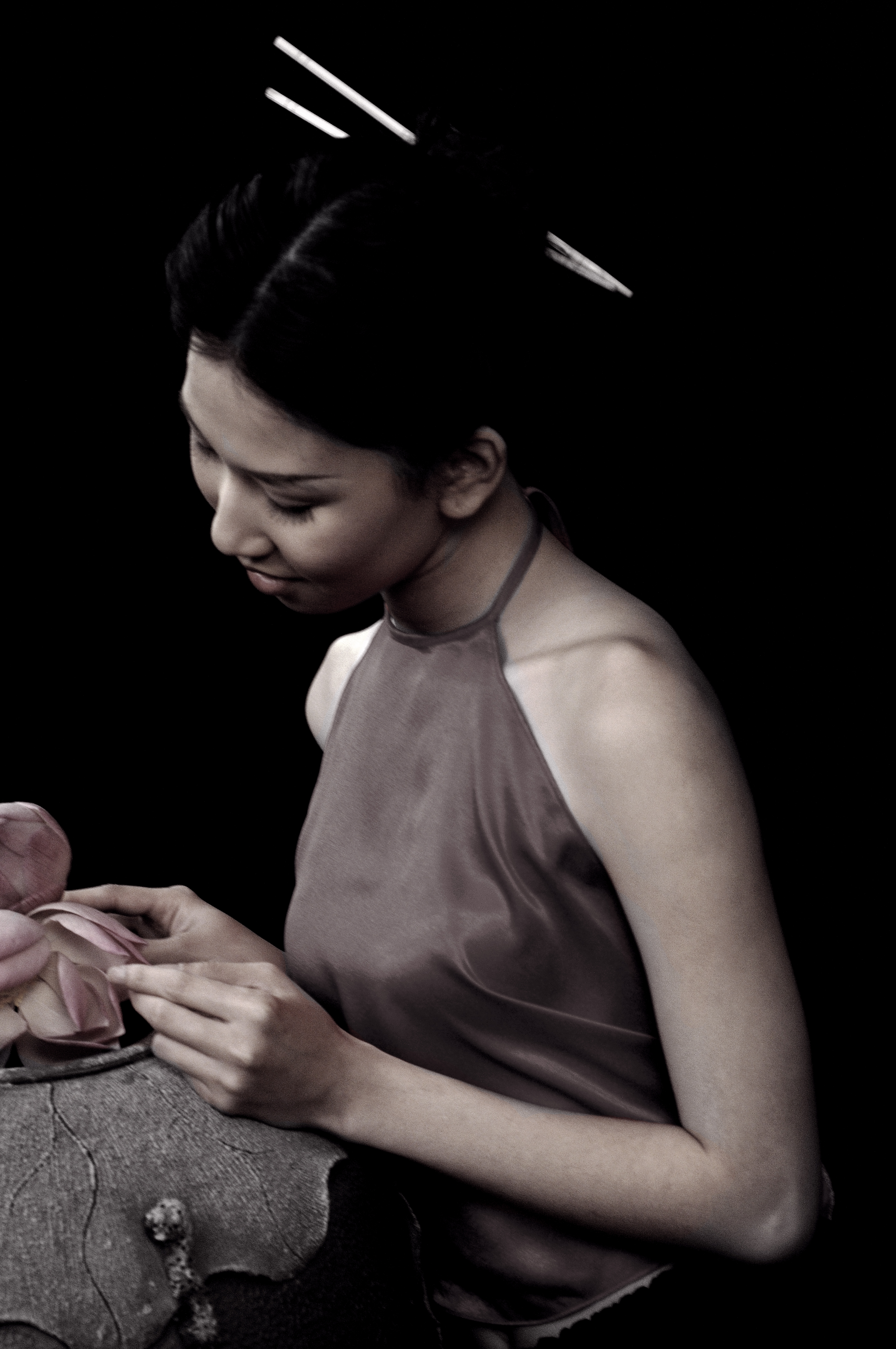
A Vietnamese woman wearing her yem as a blouse

A dudou (Chinese: 肚兜, 兜肚, or 兜兜; also known by other names) is a traditional Chinese article of clothing that covers the front of the torso, originally worn as an undershirt with medicinal properties. With the reform and opening up of China, it is sometimes encountered in Western and modern Chinese fashion as a sleeveless shirt and backless halter-top blouse.

== Name ==
In Ancient Chinese, 兜 referred to a kind of helmet or hood. By the time of the development of the dudou, it had taken on extended senses of encasing or enwrapping something as in a hood, scarf, or loose parcel. (Note: In modern Chinese, it is most often encountered as yīdōu (衣兜), a word for pockets in clothing.) Dùdōu may thus be understood as Chinese for "belly wrap" or "cover", referring to its early use to flatten the breasts and, within traditional Chinese medicine, to preserve stomach qi. Using the same characters, it is also known as a doudu or doudou. (Note: In the 19th century, dudou and doudu were also irregularly transliterated as tu-teu and teu-tu.) The latter form is diminutive and is particularly used for the dudous worn by Chinese children.

Its various Chinese names are typically left untranslated in English. In Chinese sources, the dudou is sometimes mistranslated as a "bellyband", which more commonly refers to a variety of other devices including a horse's harness and a compression garment used by expectant mothers. The oddity arises from the similarity of the dudou's purpose (though not construction or appearance) with the Japanese haramaki. In the 19th century, it was translated or glossed as a Chinese "stomacher" or "corset". The dudou is also sometimes translated or glossed as an "apron" or "bib" owing to its similar appearance.

== History ==
The dudou's original development is sometimes credited to Yang Yuhuan, the curvy consort of Emperor Xuanzong of the Tang still remembered as one of China's Four Beauties, at that time, dudou was called hezi (訶子), but the importance of the stomach as the origin of the body's blood and qi in traditional Chinese medicine has meant that variations of the undershirt are found as early as the Qin's tunic-like xièyī (t 褻衣, s 亵衣). The dudou proper was popularized under the Ming dynasty beginning in the mid-1300s around the time of the Black Death. (Note: The modern form of the dudou appears in Chinese movies anachronistically throughout all of Chinese history, as in Feng Xiaogang's 2006 Tang-era Banquet.) Versions of it were worn by female babies in medieval China until age three. Male babies also wore dudou. The medicinal aspect of the dudou was underscored by its common incorporation of small pockets to hold snatches of ginger, musk, or other herbs intended to boost the stomach's qi. Its red form is also held to ward off evil spirits in Chinese folk religions.

The dudou inspired similar fashions elsewhere, including the Vietnamese yem and the Japanese haragake. Within China, it has remained a traditional item of Chinese clothing, particularly in traditional wedding attire. Generally, however, the dudou fell out of favor towards the end of the Qing as part of the drive to modernize the country, displaced by European-style corsets and bras. After a decade of public debate, the use of dudous for flattening breasts was formally outlawed, beginning in Guangdong in 1927. This change in fashion has sometimes been linked to the rise in breast cancer occurring around the same time. Dudous first became an object of Western fashion in the year 2000, when variations of the Chinese design appeared in the spring collections of Versace, (Note: Vogue described the dudou-influenced pieces as "mischievous handkerchief blouses".) Versus, and Miu Miu. It has since become a mainstay of some Chinese-influenced fashion designers. This development inspired some Chinese women, including Zhang Ziyi, to begin wearing the dudou as an article of outerwear, although many older Chinese remain (sometimes sternly) disapproving of this development.

== Design ==
The typical design of a dudou consists of a single rectangular, rhomboidal, diamond-shaped piece of fabric which covers the breasts and belly, tied to the neck and waist with attached strings. It is thus a form of halter top. Richer women use silk, yarn or brocade while the poor make do with cotton.

Popular colors are red, pink, and green and they are often embroidered with flowers, butterflies, or Mandarin ducks. Formerly popular designs included bats (homophonous with "happiness" in Chinese), peaches ("longevity"), guavas (whose many seeds caused it to represent fertility), and virtuous expressions.

Under the Ming and Qing, dudous were solely items of underwear and were used to flatten women's breasts, similar to a gentle corset. Wealthier families used bronze, silver, or gold chains instead of silk thread. The first dudous were simple rectangles, but by the Qing they had been turned to form a diamond shape, exposing more of the shoulders.

Some variants have a collar which is lowered around the head. Western-influenced dudous may be made of other fabrics, including leather or transparent cloth.

== See also ==
- Apron
- Camisole and bodice, its Western undershirt equivalents
- Choli, an Indian bodice-like upper garment that evolved from the 6th century BC stanapatta or chest band.
- Halter top, its Western outerwear equivalent
- Haramaki, its Japanese medicinal equivalent
- History of bras
- Sleeveless shirt
- Yếm, its Vietnamese equivalent
