= Bib (garment) =

Garment worn hanging from the neck to protect clothing from spilled food

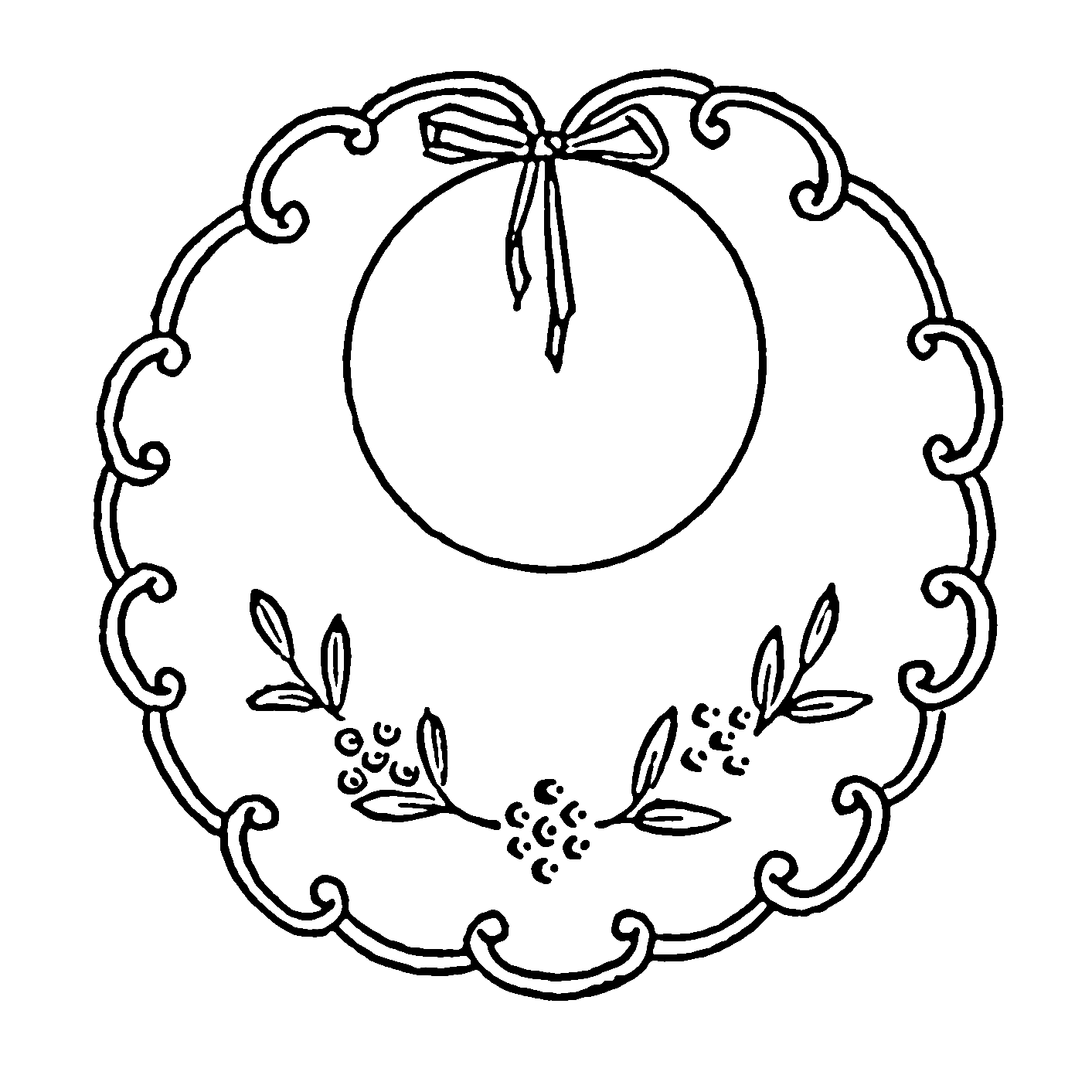
A baby bib

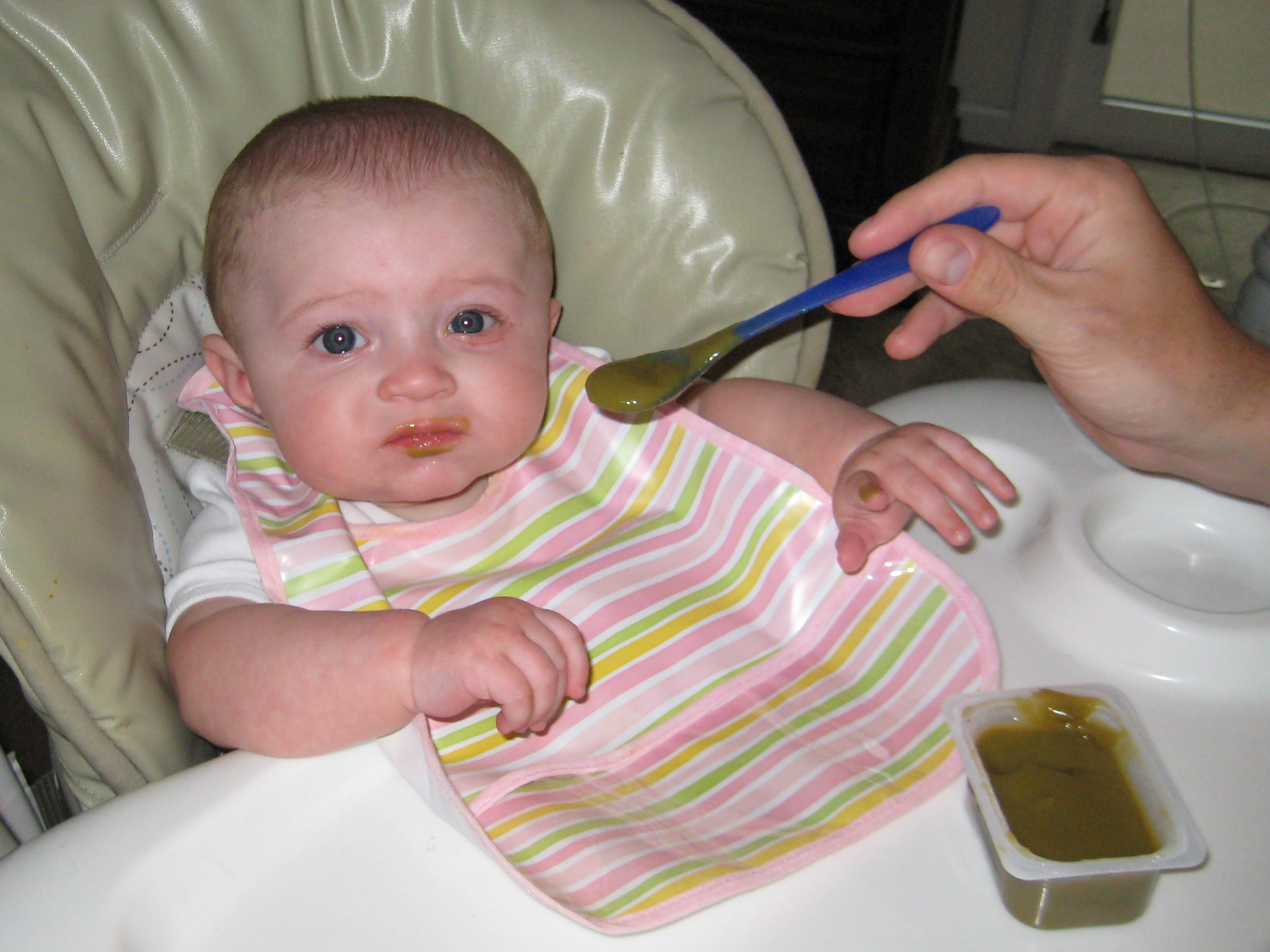
A baby wearing a bib while being fed

A bib is a garment worn hanging from the neck on the chest to protect clothing from accidentally spilled food. Bibs are frequently used by young children, especially infants, but also by some adults. Bibs are also worn when consuming certain "messy" foods. In addition, bibs are used for infants when they drool a lot, for example when they are teething.

A bib may also refer to the part of a garment that covers the chest, a garment that is used by a team to identify themselves on a field of play, or a lead covering used to prevent X-ray radiation from reaching parts of the body not being X-rayed.

== Etymology ==
The word, reported in English since 1580, probably stems from the verb bibben "to drink" (c.1380), from the Latin bibere, either because it was worn while drinking or because it "soaked up" spills.

== Other uses ==
=== Part of garment ===
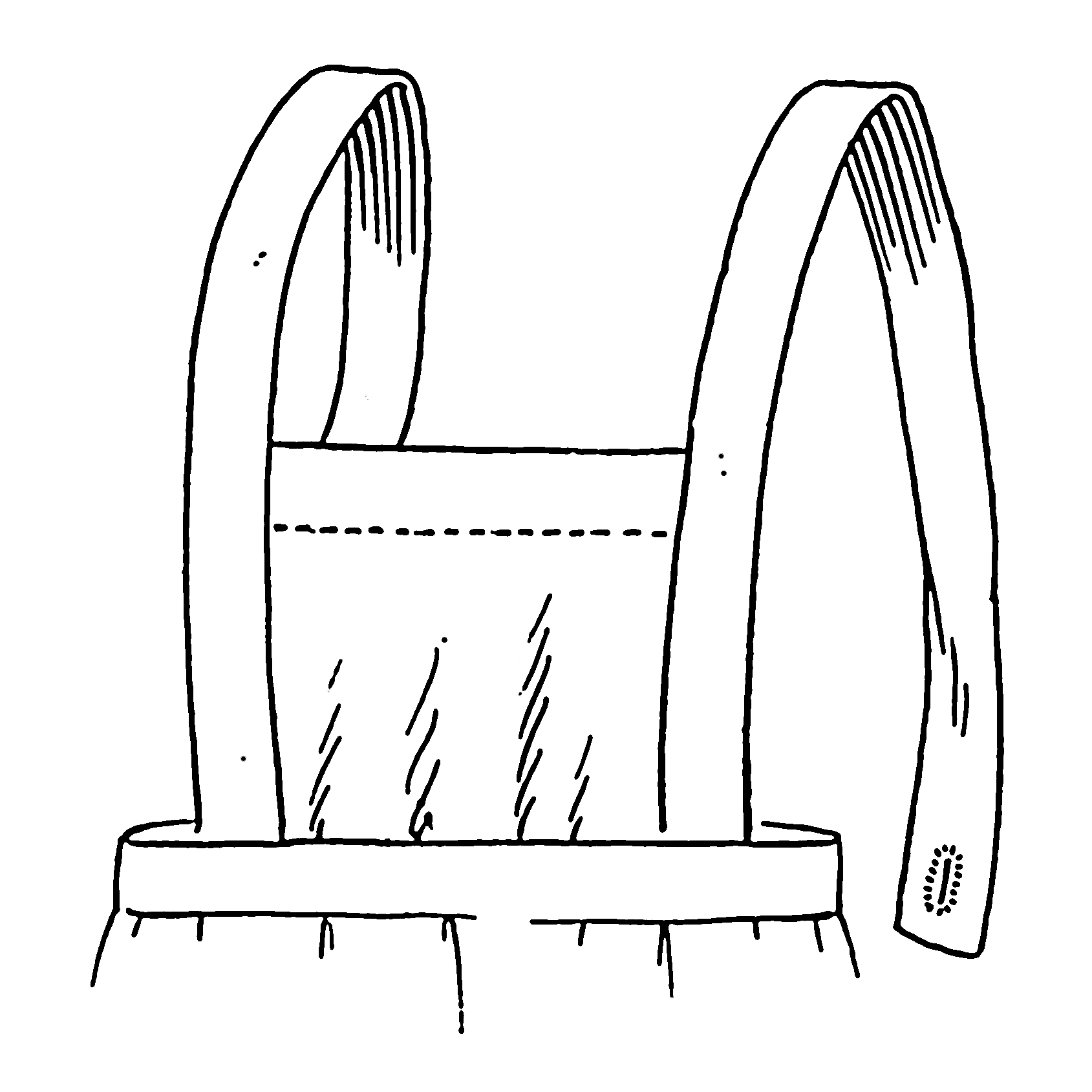
The bib of an apron

The term bib may also refer to the part of a garment that covers the chest. For instance, an apron that covers the chest may be referred to as a bib apron. The part of a jumper dress or of a pair of overalls that covers the chest may also be referred to as a bib.

=== Sports ===
In sport, it may refer to a garment that used by a team to identify themselves on the field of play (a jersey), or to identify a participant in a competition with a start number ("bib number"). In netball, bibs are used by the umpire to identify players' positions so it can be determined who is within their allowed area.

=== Medical ===
Paper or plastic bibs are used by dentists to protect the patient's clothing during treatment. In radiography, lead bibs protect patients from radiation in body parts other than those being scanned.

== See also ==
- Apron
- Dudou and Yếm, East Asian clothing sometimes translated as bibs
