= WKZU =

Classic country radio station in Iuka, Mississippi, United States

Coordinates: 34.776°N 88.394°W

- Iuka, Mississippi; United States
- Broadcast area: Northeast Mississippi, Northwest Alabama, and Southern Middle Tennessee
- Frequency: 104.9 MHz
- Branding: "Kudzu Classic Country 104.9"

Programming
- Format: Classic Country

Ownership
- Owner: John and Melinda Marsalis; (JC Media LLC)
- Sister stations: WSKK The Shark 102.3 Classic Rock

History
- Former call signs: WTIB, WFXO, WCSA

Technical information
- Licensing authority: FCC
- Class: C2
- ERP: 50,000 watts
- HAAT: 135 meters

Links
- Public license information: Public file; LMS
- Website: https://kudzu1049.com/

WKZU Kudzu 104.9 FM, formally WKZU Kudzu 102.3 FM, is a 50,000 watt FM radio station licensed to Iuka, Mississippi operating as Kudzu 104.9 Classic Country. The station has a Classic Country music format, with music from the 1960s, 1970s, 1980s, and 1990s. The station's target audience is 32- to 54-year-old adults who started listening to country music in the 1970s and 1980s.
