= Gymslip =

Part of a school uniform for girls

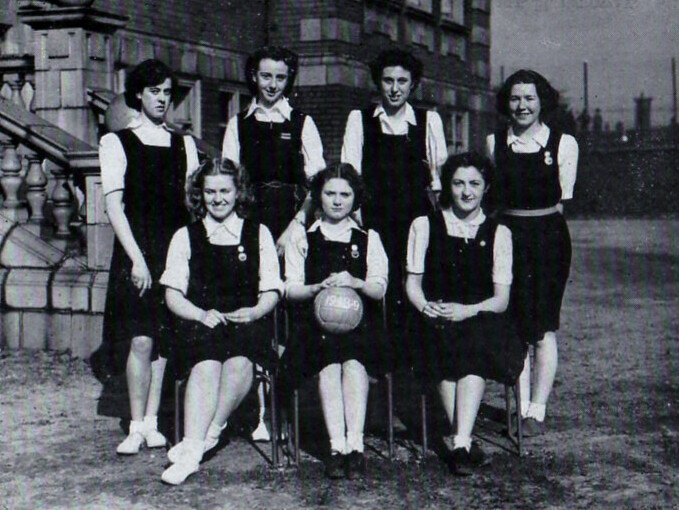
The Hyde Grammar School netball team, 1949, wearing gymslips (Manchester, England).

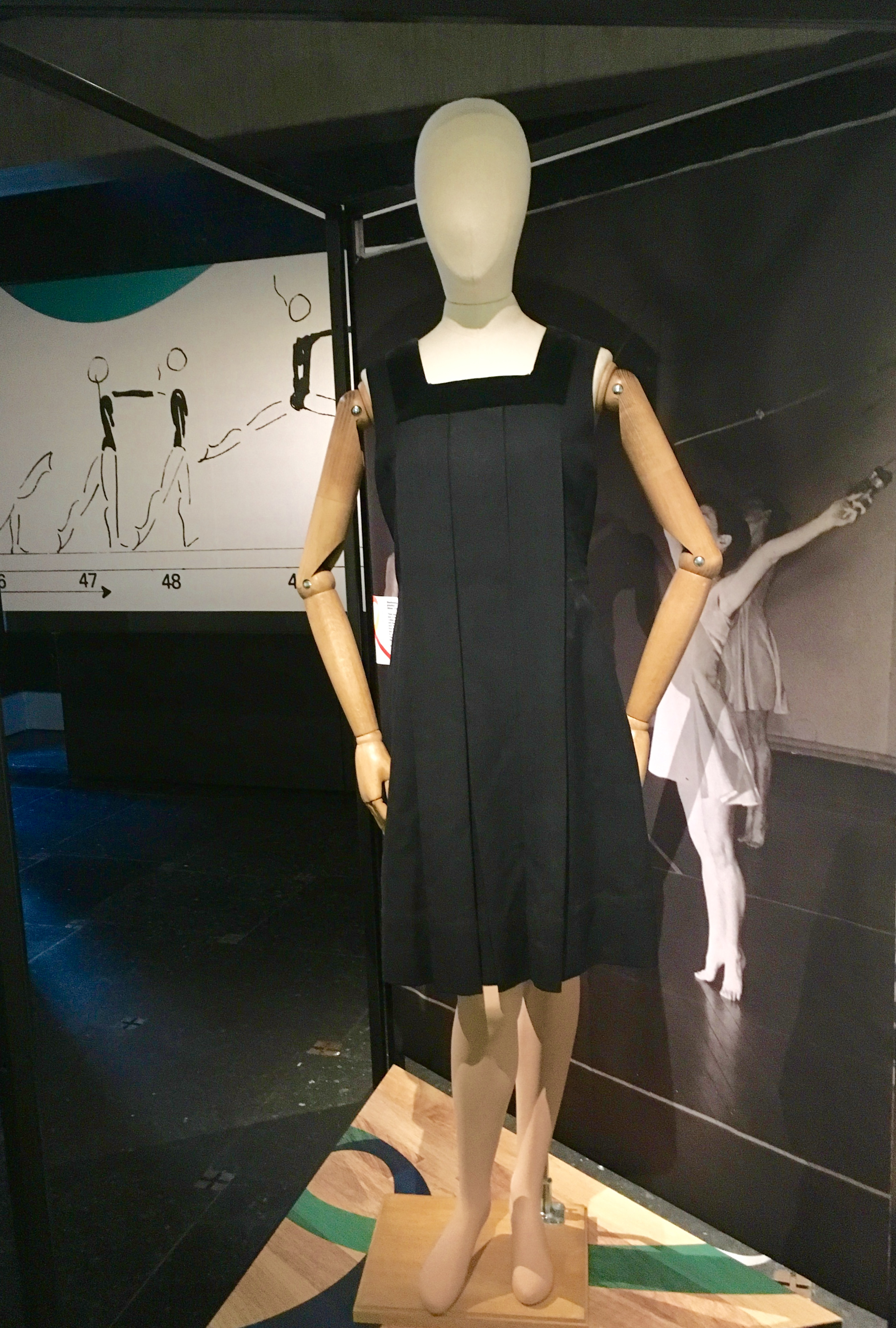
Navy woolen pinafore dress with velvet yoke, worn by students of Dunfermline College of Physical Education c. 1910–1920.

A gymslip is a sleeveless tunic with a pleated skirt most commonly seen as part of a school uniform for girls. The term "gymslip" primarily refers to the school uniform; otherwise the term pinafore dress (British English) or jumper dress (American English) is usually preferred.

The introduction of the gymslip as female athletic wear is credited to Mary Tait, a student of Martina Bergman-Österberg, a pioneer of women's physical education in Britain. Gymslips were worn by gymnasts and track and field athletes from the 1880s to the 1920s, as they were more mobile than traditional female attire, but still modest enough to keep the underwear hidden during sporting activity. Even in this modest attire, gymslips as athletic wear were still worn strictly out of public view.

When not worn as athletic wear, gymslips or pinafore dresses are generally worn over a blouse and replace a skirt. A blazer may be worn over the top, or gym knickers underneath. First emerging in the 1900s, by the 1920s it had become compulsory in many private, convent and high schools, and thus became commonly worn by girls as part of their school uniform, together with a blouse.

Although now largely replaced by modern-style uniforms, gymslips are still synonymous in Britain with schoolgirls, leading to the slang term "gymslip mum" to describe a teenage pregnancy. Well-known modern depictions of gymslips include the St Trinian's films, and less traditionally, schoolgirl uniform pornography, a use given more public recognition when in 1991 politician Clare Short condemned the fetish, saying that "the Page 3 girl in a gymslip may be over 16, but the imagery is clearly intended to present schoolgirls as sexual objects".

== See also ==
- Apron
- Rational dress
