= Apron Museum =

The Apron Museum
- Established: 2006
- Location: Iuka, Mississippi, United States of America
- Coordinates: 34°48′44″N 88°11′27″W
- Type: Fashion museum
- Directors: Carolyn and Henry Terry
- Website: https://www.TheApronMuseum.com

The Apron Museum in Iuka, Mississippi, is the only museum in the United States dedicated to aprons and the stories they tell.

== Founding ==
Iuka native Carolyn Terry founded the museum after attending estate sales and auctions in order to buy books. Terry was instead tempted by the fabric of the aprons, and would purchase bundles of aprons, which spurred her scholarly interest in the subject.

Terry opened The Apron Museum in 2006.

== Collections ==
The museum showcases thousands of aprons dating as far back as to the American Civil War, as well as more modern pop-culture tribute aprons with Star Wars and Family Guy themes. The aprons are organized by U.S. state, with aprons from Canada and Australia also on display.

Similarly to the Museum of Bags and Purses in Amsterdam, the Apron Museum treats its subject as an art form, demonstrating how artists drew their apron patterns out, the period needlework, the stitching and sewing techniques, and how they were worn. Aprons have been important garments or accoutrements for ladies, blacksmiths, butchers, carpenters, printers, shopkeepers and especially homemakers, but wealthy people could afford more expensive fabric, more elaborate embroidery, and other more intricate features, so the aprons also offer insight into the social class of the person who owned them, functioning as status symbols, similarly to designer purses and shoes today.

The bulk of the collection is from the 1950s, when women donned stylish elaborate hostess aprons for bridge and garden parties, and men wore chef-style aprons for backyard barbecuing. Construction materials include checkered cotton gingham, handkerchiefs, and recycled feed and flour sacks adorned with appliquéd bows, rickrack, ruffles and oversized pockets.

Many donations to the museum include a handwritten letter with the history of the apron and apron-related stories from visitors to the museum are preserved as part of the curated exhibit.

== In popular culture ==
The museum has been featured in Ripley's Believe It or Not!.
