= Belly band =

Belly band, belly-band, or bellyband may refer to:

- Bellyband, a fairly loose strap passing outside the girth in a horse harness
- Bellyband, a compression garment used as maternity clothing
- Bellyband, a form of holster
- Bellyband, another name for an obi, a type of dust jacket that covers only a portion of a book
- Corset, in early modern slang
- Haramaki, a Japanese wrap used to preserve stomach qi
- Dudou, an unrelated Chinese garment used for a similar purpose

== See also ==
- Belly, an American rock band
