= Cummerbund =

Broad waist sash

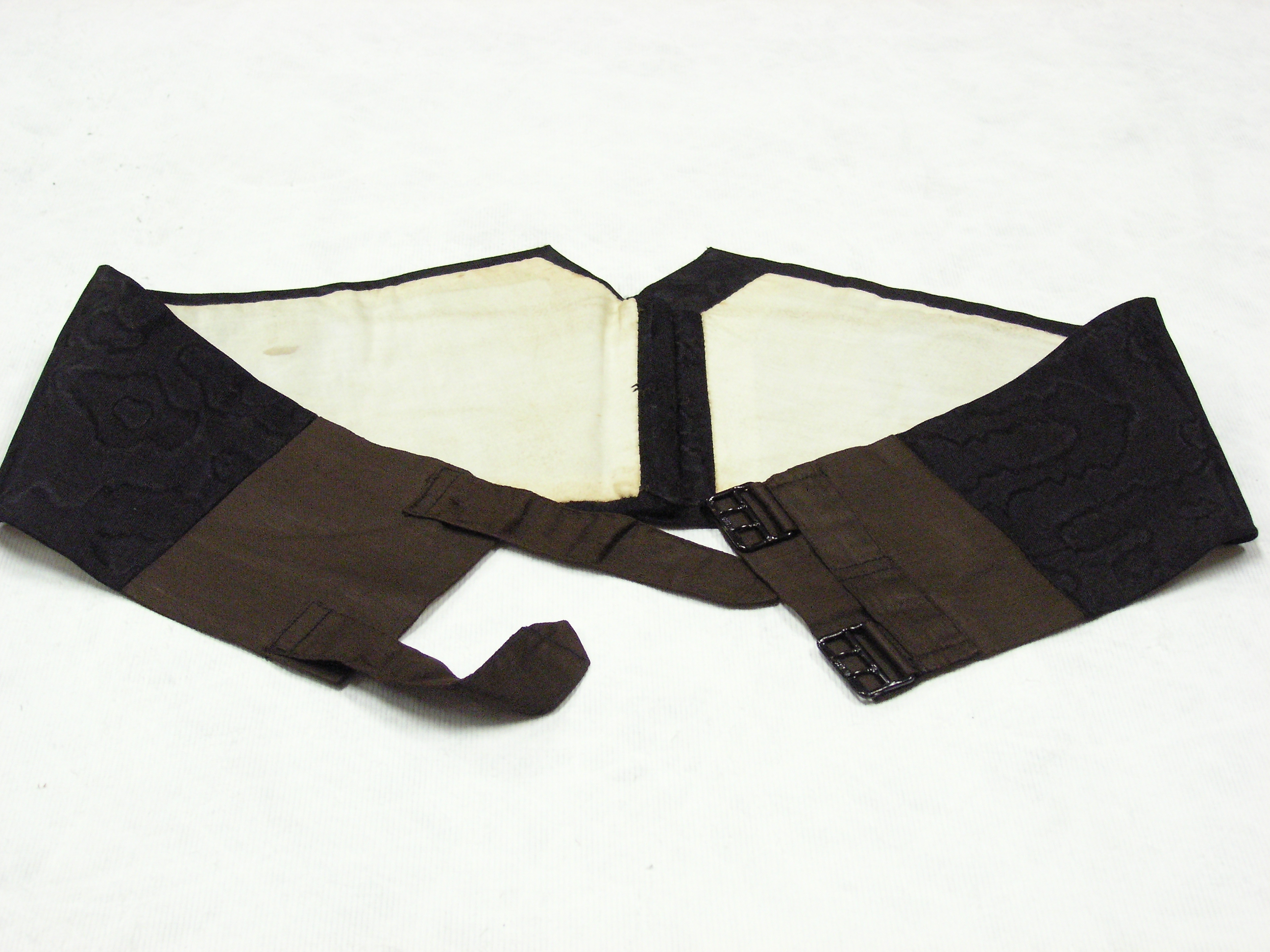
Black tie cummerbund

A cummerbund is a broad waist sash, usually pleated, which is often worn with single-breasted dinner jackets (or tuxedos). The cummerbund was adopted by British military officers in colonial India, where they saw it worn by sepoys (Indian soldiers) of the British Indian Army. It was adopted as an alternative to the waistcoat, and later spread to civilian use. The modern use of the cummerbund for Europeans and North Americans is as a component of the traditional black tie Western dress code.

== Etymology ==
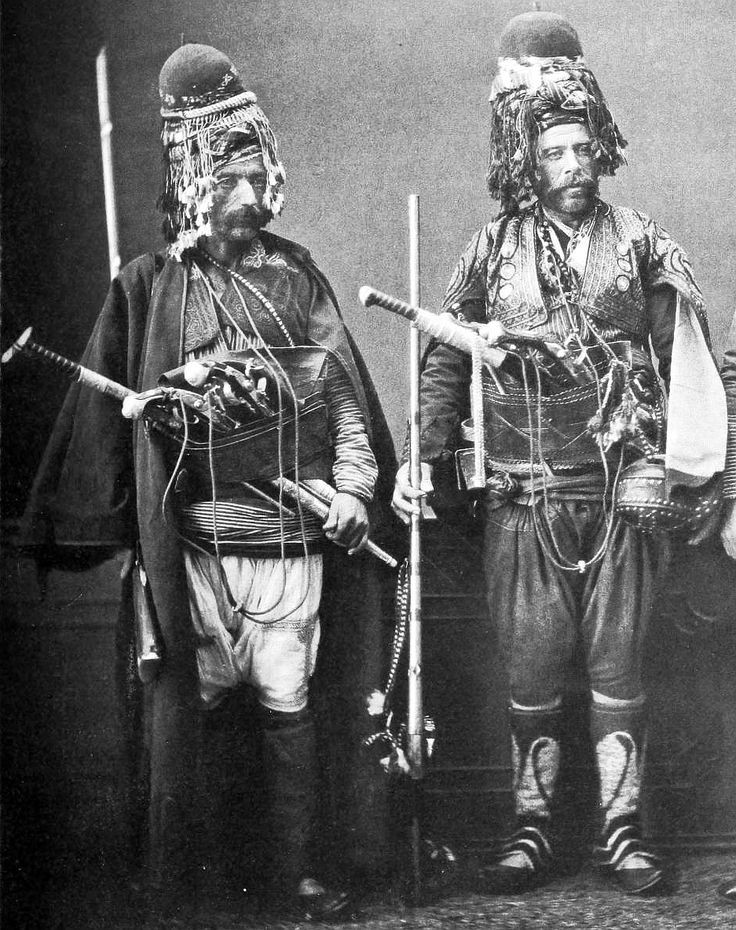
Turkish Zeybek Kushak

The word cummerbund is the Anglicized form of Hindustani kamarband (Hindustani: कमरबंद; کمربند), which originated from the Persian (Persian: کمربند, romanized: kamarband). It entered English vocabulary in 1616 from India. It is a combination of the Persian words kamar meaning 'waist' and band meaning 'to close' or 'fasten' (not to be confused with ‘band’ from Old Norse, reinforced in late Middle English by Old French bande, of Germanic origin; related to bind, though both ultimately descend from Proto-Indo-European *bʰendʰ "to bind", "bond"). The 'waist-band' was a sash accessory worn by Indian men for many occasions.

The word cummerband (see below), and less commonly the German spelling Kummerbund (a Germanized spelling variation of the English word), are often used synonymously with cummerbund in English.

== Description ==
=== Form and occasion ===
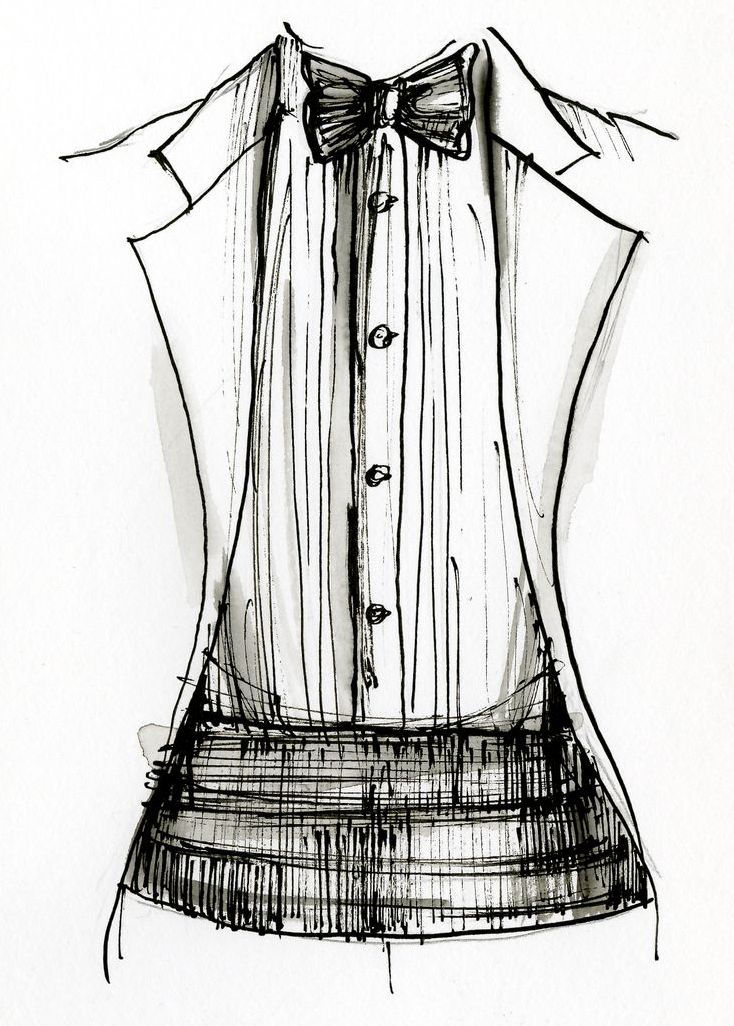
Cummerbund with dress shirt

The form of the cummerbund is a wide band around the waist. The fastening is a ribbon around the back, tied or held shut by a buckle or velcro. The contemporary use of the cummerbund is purely aesthetic, providing a transition between the shirt and the waistband. They have also expanded in less formal situations into use with components of white tie, particularly by musicians, who sometimes wear a white cummerbund instead of the traditional piqué waistcoat.

=== Pleats ===
The pleats face up because they were originally used to hold ticket stubs and similar items, explaining the slang name 'crumb-catcher'. However, the cummerbunds worn as part of the US Army Blue Mess and Blue Evening Mess uniforms are worn with the pleats down, as prescribed by Army Regulation 670–1 Chapter 24 Section 10(b). The US Navy Uniform Regulations NAVPERS 15665 stipulate the cummerbund be worn with the pleats up for the Navy Dinner Dress Jacket.

=== Colours ===
Its origin as part of black tie determined the acceptable colours. It was adopted as civilian dress, beginning as a largely summer option with informal dinner jackets, such as Burmese fawn and white, later, it was restricted to the narrow range of colours which accompany black tie. These were predominantly black, sometimes midnight blue to match the trousers, and occasionally maroon (the normal hue for coloured accessories). In contemporary use, it is now common to see coloured bow ties and cummerbunds, often matching, but this is considered non-traditional.

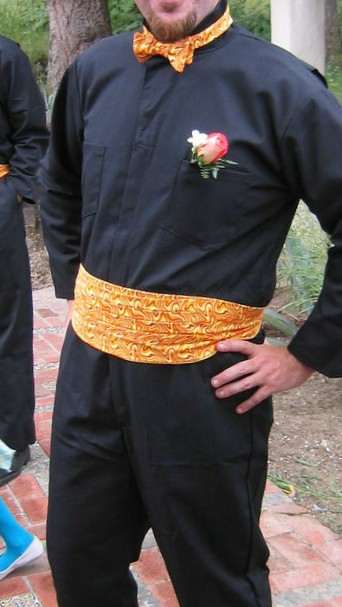
Brightly coloured cummerbund

== Military cummerbunds ==
Most units of the French Army of Africa wore cummerbunds of two different colours: blue for the European soldiers of the Zouaves and Chasseurs d'Afrique; and red for the native Spahis and Tirailleurs. Some modern French regiments with a colonial history origin, still retain cummerbunds as part of their full dress uniform (notably the French Foreign Legion and the Spahis).

Cummerbunds (kamarbands) were an accessory to the dress uniform used in several modern South Asian armies, including the Indian Army, the Pakistan Army and the Bangladesh Army. It is generally worn during ceremonial parades and dinners. The colour or combination of colours varies widely according to regiment or corps.

Unlike the civilian cummerbund, a leather belt is worn above this cloth piece and one end hangs free displaying an ornamental fringe.

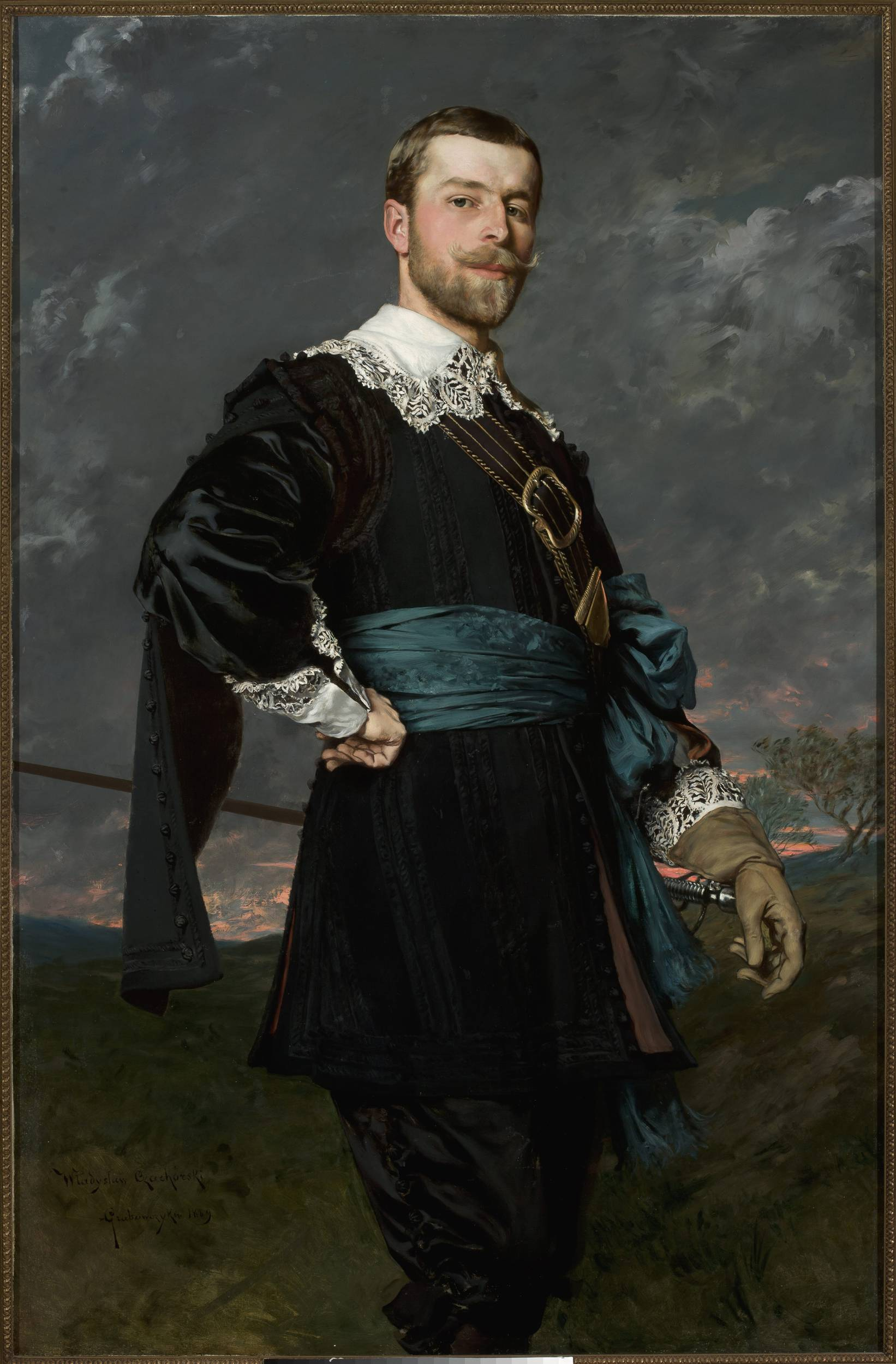
Portrait of Stanisław Czachórski (1853–1904), depicted with a blue cummerbund in a masquerade outfit. Painting by the subject's brother, Władysław Czachórski, 1886

== Athletic cummerbunds ==
During the 19th and early 20th centuries, cotton cummerbunds were commonly worn by athletes participating in gymnastic and/or combat sport training and competition.

== Cummerbunds in scuba diving ==
A cummerbund is also an informal word used in scuba diving to mean a wide waistband either on a buoyancy control device designed to provide more comfort to the user than a standard waistband and usually made of a stout fabric backed with velcro fastenings, or on a two-piece dry suit where a flexible rubber waistband helps to maintain a watertight seal between the jacket and the pants of the suit.

== In women's fashion ==
In some cases a cummerbund can be worn as an element of women's evening dress.

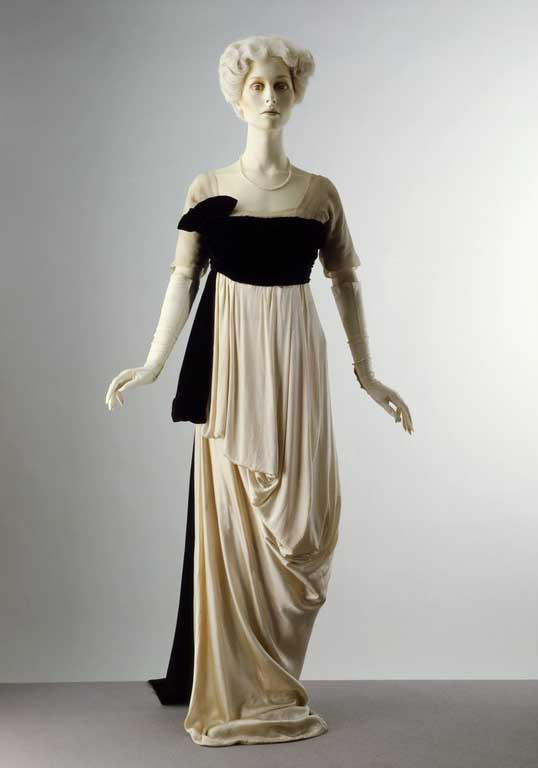
Evening dress, Spring 1913 by Lucy, Lady Duff-Gordon

== See also ==
- Haramaki (clothing)
- Obi (sash)#Men's obi
- Obi (martial arts)
