= Jumper (dress) =

Sleeveless, collarless dress worn over a blouse, shirt or sweater

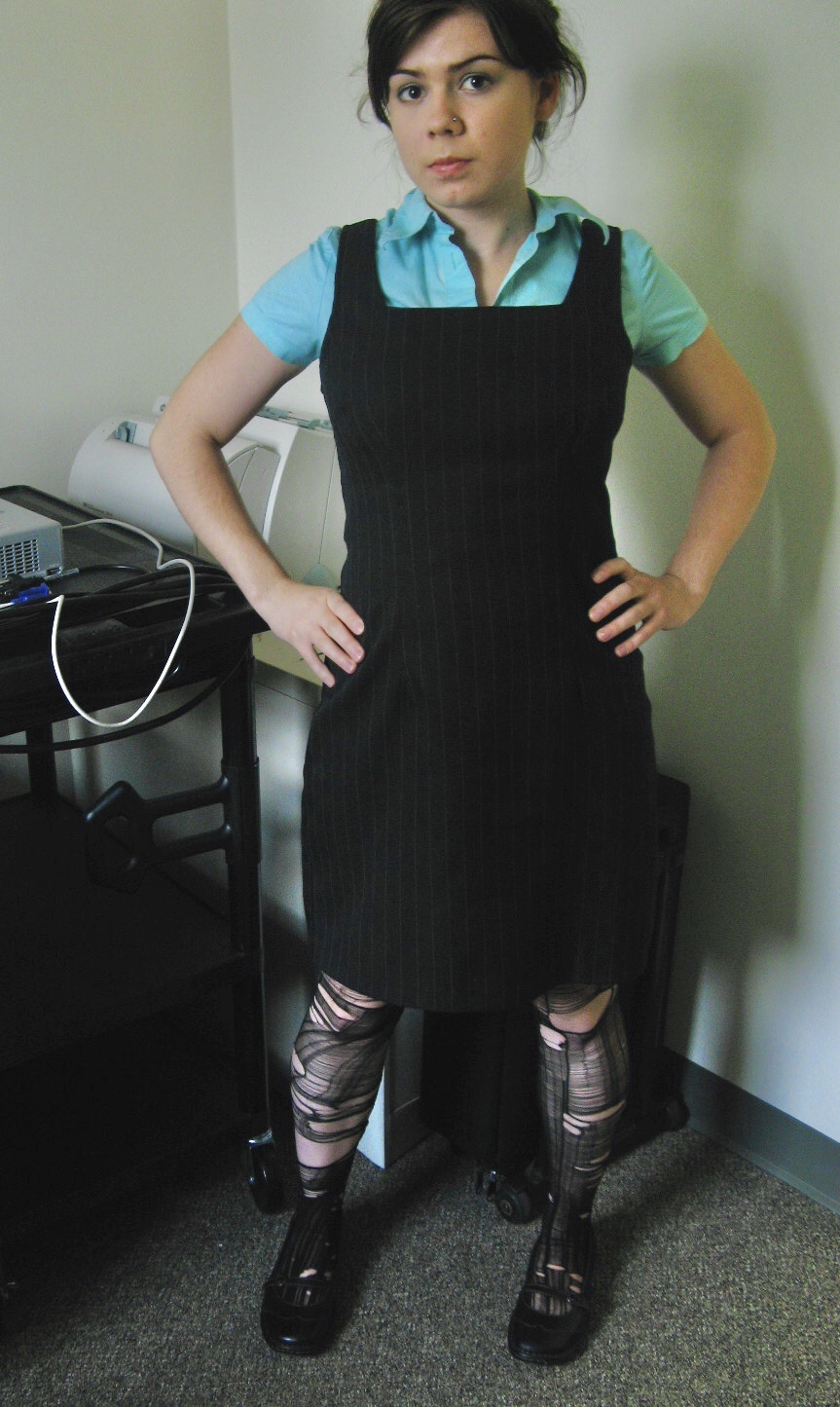
Contemporary outfit including a black jumper or pinafore dress

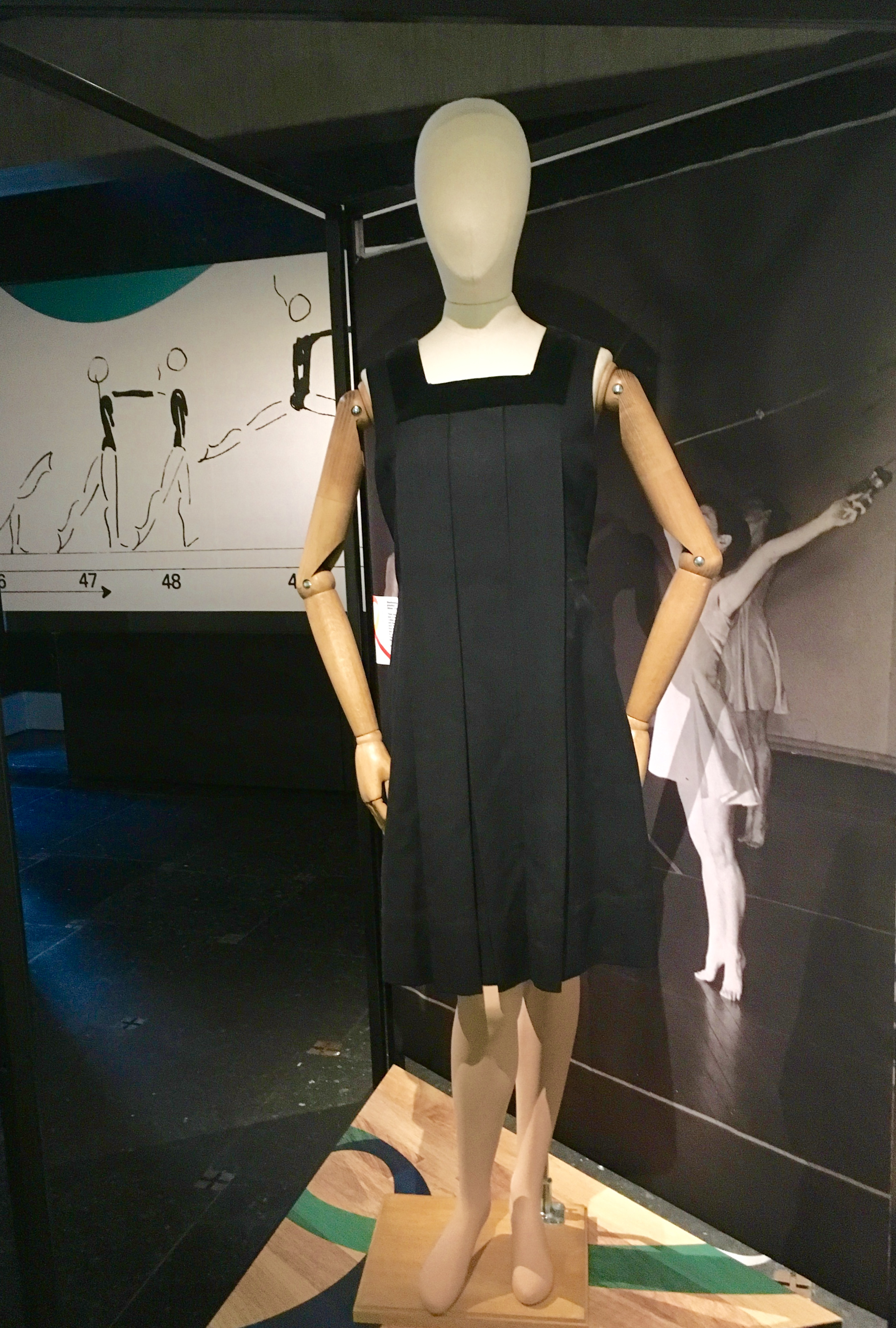
Navy woolen pinafore with velvet yoke (gymslip), worn by students of Dunfermline College of Physical Education c. 1910–1920

A jumper (in American English), jumper dress, or pinafore dress is a sleeveless, collarless dress intended to be worn over a blouse, shirt, T-shirt or sweater. Hemlines can be of different lengths and the type of collar and whether there is pleating are also variables in the design.

In British English, the term jumper describes what is called a sweater in American English. Also, in more formal British usage, a distinction is made between a pinafore dress and a pinafore. The latter, though a related garment, has an open back and is worn as an apron. In American English, pinafore always refers to an apron.

A jumper is distinct from a sundress, which is typically sleeveless and collarless likewise, but generally of a different cut and fashion and designed to be worn on its own.

The apron dress may be viewed as a special case of the jumper. If the design of the dress is directly inspired by an apron (having a bib in front and ties in the back, for example), the garment is typically described as an apron dress.

== History ==
Jumpers for fall were described in The Fort Wayne Sentinel in 1906. The dresses were "imported from Paris" and featured "original lines".

Jumpers in the United States were part of the sportswear collections of Jean Patou, Coco Chanel and Paul Poiret. Suzanne Lenglen wore Patou's jumper design in the 1920s. The dresses, worn over blouses, became popular during the decade of the 1920s. Jumpers were often worn in the summer and made out of various types of fabrics.

Jumpers were touted as an "American" and a "sports fashion" in 1930 by the Pittsburgh Press. The dresses were also praised for allowing women to create color combinations through the choice of blouse worn underneath.

Jumpers were again popularized in 1953, when Hubert de Givenchy promoted his own jumper. Jumpers, now considered a "classic" look, were considered "suitable to all ages."

== See also ==
- Gymslip – a British pinafore dress worn as athletic wear or school uniform
- Kirtle – a medieval garment of similar function
- Romper suit – combination of shorts and shirt
- Sarafan – a similar Russian traditional dress
