= Haramaki (armour) =

Type of Japanese chest armour

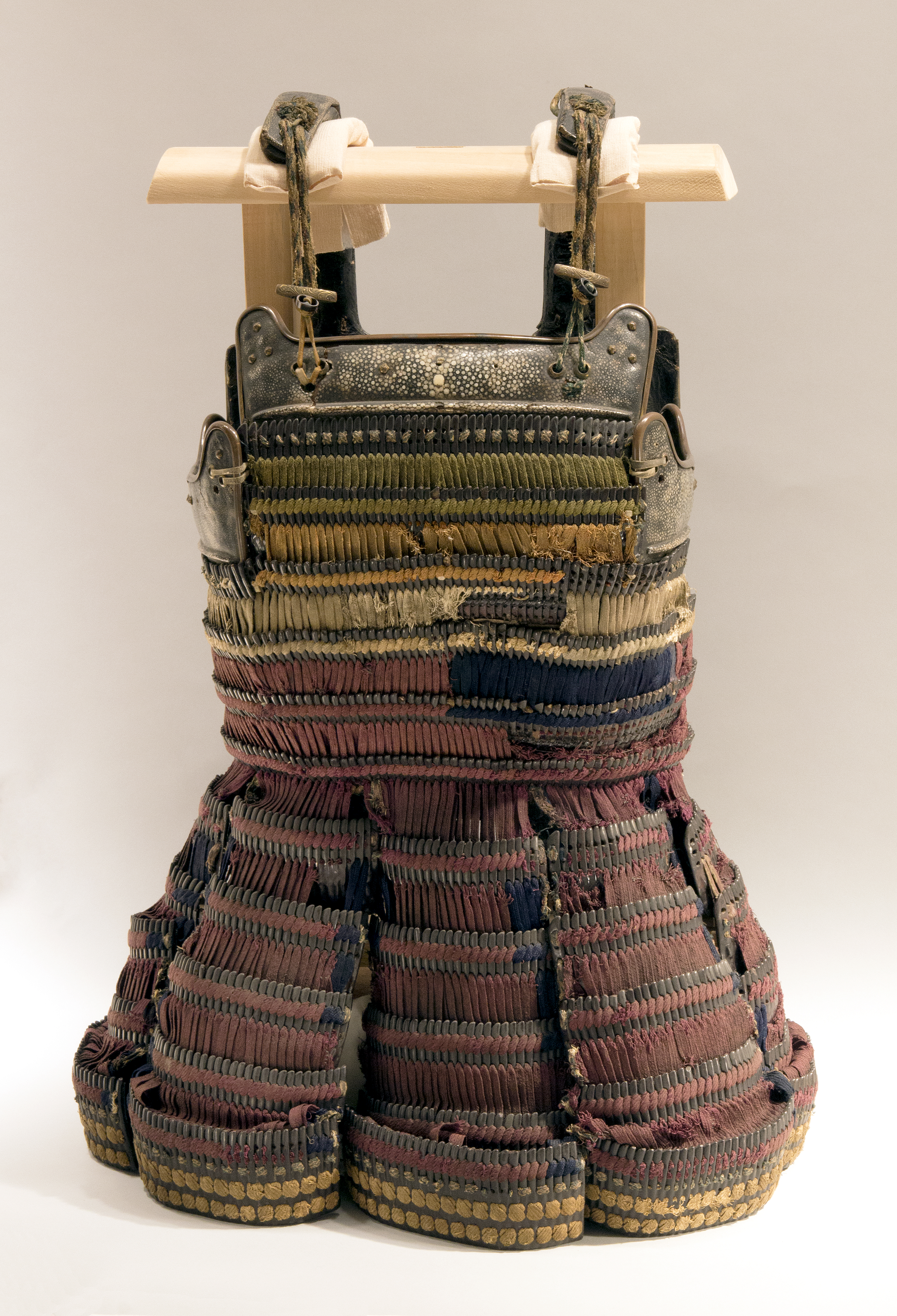
A haramaki cuirass, made of iron lamellar with leather lacing, 15th–16th century

Haramaki (腹巻, belly wrap) is a type of chest armour (dō) worn by the samurai class of feudal Japan and their retainers.

== Description ==
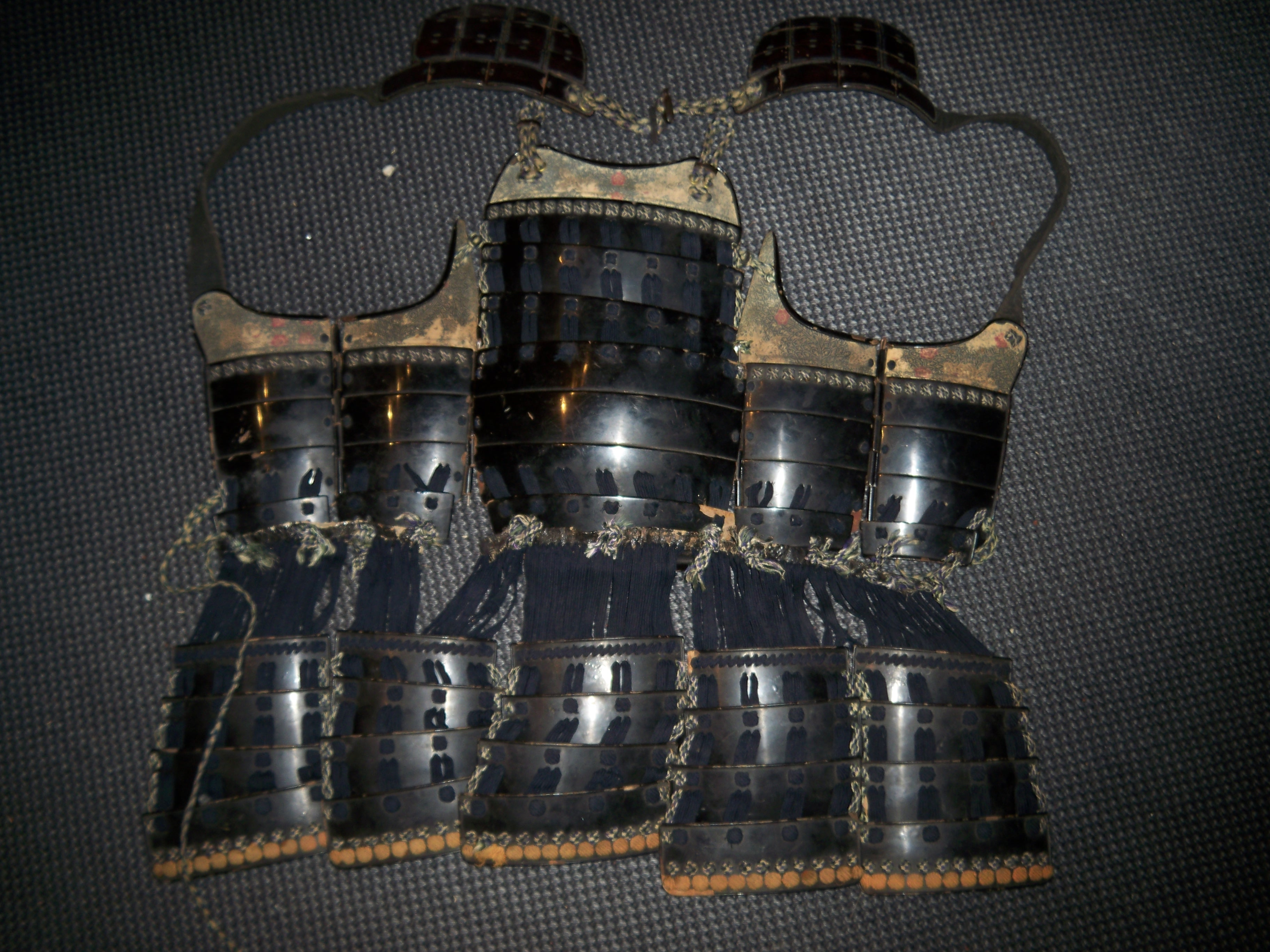
Antique Edo period Japanese (samurai) 4 hinge 5 plate (go-mai) dou or dō that is opens in the back (haramaki)

Haramaki were originally constructed with the same materials as the ō-yoroi but designed for foot soldiers to use as opposed to the ō-yoroi which was for mounted warfare. Haramaki refers to any Japanese armour which is put on from the front and then fastened in the back with cords. Other types of dō open from the side (ni-mai dō, dō-maru, maru-dō) instead of opening from the back as the haramaki does.

Modern haramaki are thick cloth undergarments worn around the belly to increase body heat retention during the winter.

== See also ==
- Japanese armour
