= WRMG =

- Red Bay, Alabama; United States
- Frequency: 1430 kHz

Programming
- Format: Classic country

Ownership
- Owner: Ivy Broadcasting; (Jack W. Ivy, Sr.)

Technical information
- Licensing authority: FCC
- Facility ID: 55419
- Class: D
- Power: 1000 watts (day); 71 watts (night)
- Transmitter coordinates: 34°24′51″N 88°08′11″W

Links
- Public license information: Public file; LMS
- Webcast: Listen live
- Website: http://www.wrmgradio.com/

WRMG (1430 AM) is a radio station licensed to serve Red Bay, Alabama. The station is owned by Ivy Broadcasting and licensed to Jack W. Ivy, Sr. It airs a Classic Country format.

== History ==
In December 2001, Jack W. Ivy reached an agreement to purchase WRMG from Jimmy Pyle for a reported sale price of. At the time of the sale, the station broadcast a country music format.

In April 2016 the station acquired a nearby translator from the Iuka (MS) area and has applied to move it to 97.9 MHz to rebroadcast this station. (Taken From Alabama Broadcast Media Page) As of September 30, 2016, the license for this station was granted. (W250CD 97.9 FM) (Info extracted from Radio-Locator)
