= Haramaki (clothing) =

Japanese clothing to cover the stomach

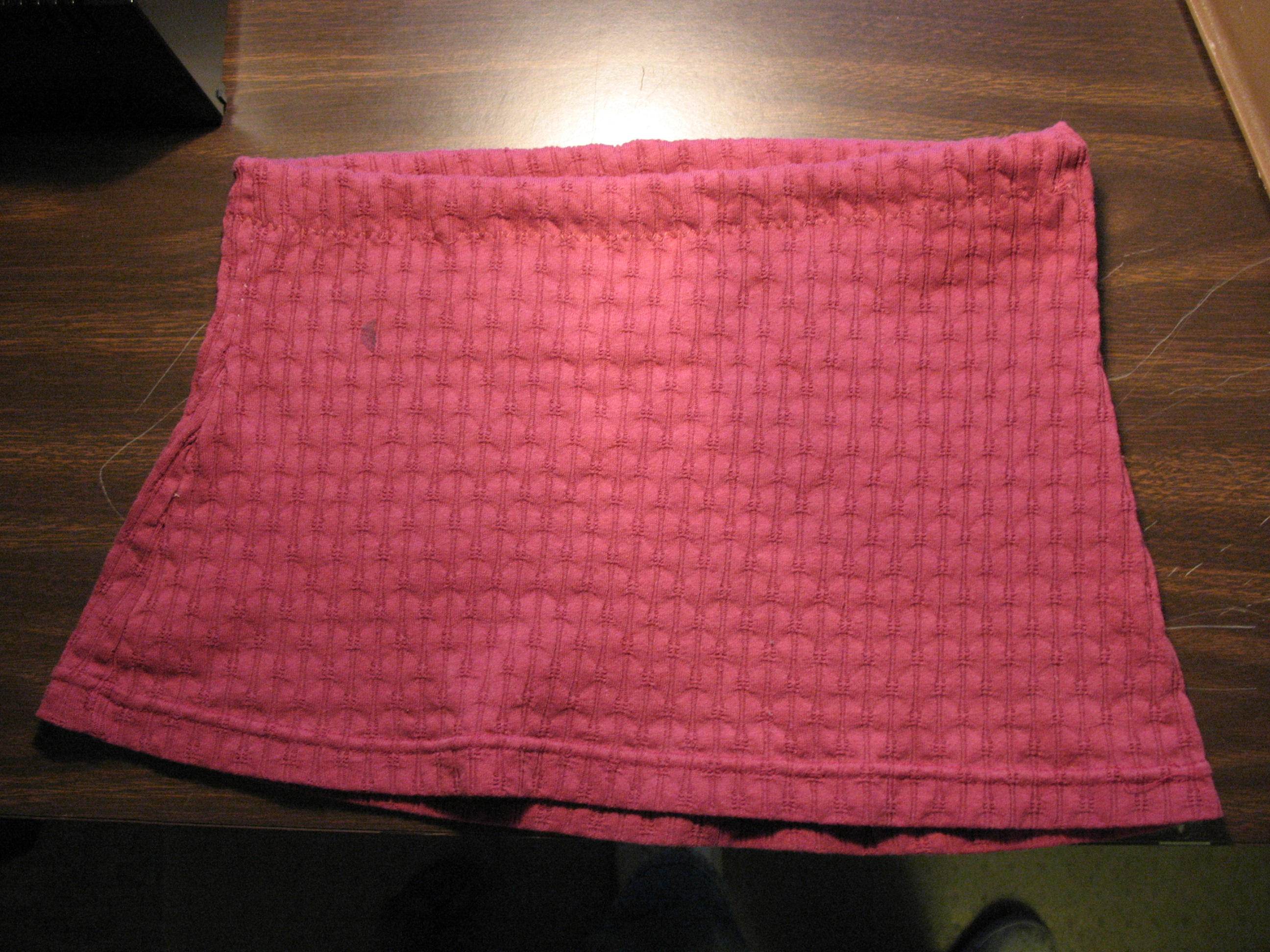
A modern haramaki

Haramaki (腹巻, lit. 'bellyband') are items of Japanese clothing that cover the stomach. They are worn for health and fashion reasons.

== Wartime use ==
During the First Sino-Japanese War and World War II, a soldier going off to fight was often given a senninbari haramaki ("1,000 stitch belt") by his family. A mother, sister, or wife would stand on the street and ask passing women to contribute a stitch until 1,000 had been collected. The garment was meant to both provide warmth and serve as a talisman to ward away harm.

== Popular fashion ==
Modern haramaki do not have much in common with their historical predecessors that were made for armour. They are a simple circular tube of fabric, much like a tube top, worn around the midriff as opposed to the chest.

The new haramaki have gained popularity in Japanese fashion as an accessory and are made from many fabrics and patterns for practical and aesthetic purposes. Shigesato Itoi and his company Hobonichi are commonly credited for the current resurgence. Itoi had been wearing haramaki for years despite their old-fashioned reputation and perception as an unfashionable undergarment, eventually re-introducing them as an accessory for sale in Japan.

== See also ==
- Sarashi
- Belly band
- Cummerbund
