= Vietnamese clothing =

Vietnamese name
- Vietnamese alphabet: Trang phục Việt Nam; Việt phục

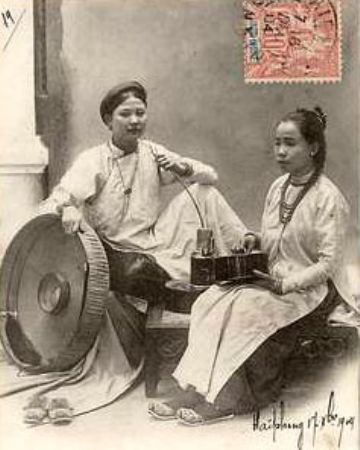
Early 20th century postcard depicting Vietnamese women in áo ngũ thân. The woman on the left is wearing khăn vấn while holding a nón ba tầm.

Vietnamese clothing (Vietnamese: Trang phục Việt Nam) also known as Việt phục, are various styles of clothing traditionally and historically worn in Vietnam, narrowly referring to the clothing tradition of the Viet people. The most popular style of traditional Vietnamese clothing is áo dài, a 20th century modernization of áo ngũ thân designed primarily for women.

== History ==
The clothing and textile history of Vietnam reflects the culture and tradition that has been developed since the ancient Bronze Age wherein people of diverse cultures were living in Vietnam, the long influence of the Chinese and their associated cultural influence, as well as the short-lived French colonial rule. The dynamic cultural exchanges which took place with those foreign cultural influences had a significant impact on the history of clothing in Vietnam; this has eventually lead to the birth to a distinctive Vietnamese clothing style, áo dài is only one of such clothing for example. Moreover, as Vietnam has multiple ethnicities, there are many distinctive styles of clothing which reflect their wearer's ethnicity.

Since the ancient times, textiles used and produced in Vietnam have been silk in Northern Vietnam, barkcloth, and banana fiber cloth; kapok and hemp were also generally used prior to the introduction of cotton.

For at least a thousand years, Vietnam was ruled by the Chinese in the north while the south of Vietnam was ruled by the Indian-culture influenced, independent kingdom of Champa. During this period, the clothing styles which were developed in Vietnam contained both indigenous and imported foreign elements; the upper classes tended to be more easily influenced by those foreign influences than the common people. The upper classes of Vietnam in Northern Vietnam tended to wear clothing which mirrored and was influenced by the fashions of the Chinese, and this style of clothing persisted even after the end of the Chinese rule in the independent kingdom of Đại Việt and in Champa.

For centuries, peasant women typically wore a halter top (yếm) underneath a blouse or overcoat, alongside a skirt (váy or quần không đáy). It was until the 1920s in Vietnam's north area in isolated hamlets where skirts were worn. Before the Nguyễn dynasty, the cross-collared robe (áo tràng vạt) was worn popularly.

=== Bách Việt period (1000 BC - 1 BC) ===
Most of ancient northern Vietnam was referred as the Lạc Việt which was considered to be part of the Baiyue region in ancient Chinese texts. Prior to the Chinese conquest, the Tai nobles first came in Northern Vietnam during the Đông Sơn era, and they started to assimilate the local Mon-Khmer and Kra-dai people in a processed referred as Tai-ization or Tai-ification as the Tai people were politically and culturally dominant in Baiyue; this led to the adoption of the Tai people's clothing and the formation of dress style influenced by the Tai people.

The Han Chinese referred to the various non-Han "barbarian" peoples of North Vietnam and Southern China as "Yue" (Việt) or Baiyue, saying they possessed common habits like adapting to water, having their hair cropped short and having tattoos.

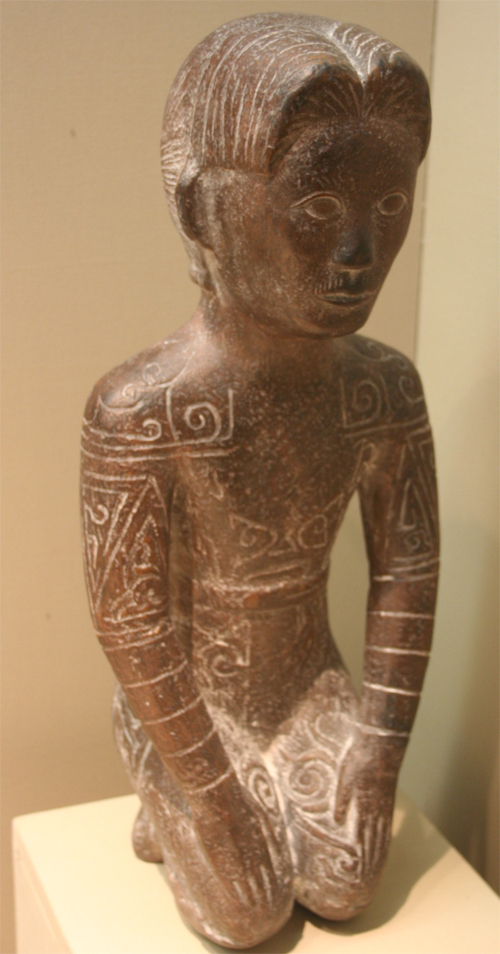
Statue of a man with Yue-style short hair and tribal body tattoos, from the state of Yue among the non-Chinese Baiyue peoples of southern China and north Vietnam.

=== Nanyue ===
Nanyue (204 BC–111 BC) was an independent state which was founded by a Chinese general. However, in the Kingdom of Nanyue, it was the elite who were primarily influenced by Chinese clothing as the presence of the Chinese was limited. The clothing of the elites of Nanyue was mixed of Tai and Chinese clothing styles. The clothing of the Elites include Chinese fashion from the Warring States period and the Qin dynasty; the style of clothing was mainly a V-shaped collar gown which was tight fitting that was folded to the right. The clothing was multi-layered; it was common to wear three layers of clothing and tended to have narrow and straight sleeves. The elites women on the other-hand tended to wear a blouse and a skirt.

=== Chinese Conquest Period of Vietnam ===
The Kingdom of Nanyue (204 BC–111 BC) was conquered and ruled by the Han Chinese under the Han dynasty in 111 BC. The Chinese ruled over Northern Vietnam for 1000 years until c. 900 AD. This time, it was the Chinese which lead to acculturation process referred as Sinicization. The clothing of officials in Northern Vietnam followed the regulations of the Chinese dress. However, even during the Han dynasty (202 BC – 220 AD), there was still very little Chinese migration into Northern Vietnam. It was in the subsequent centuries after the fall of the Han dynasty that there was a large influx of Chinese in the region of Annan.

From 43 AD to 939 AD, the direct rule of the Chinese in Northern Vietnam led to the Chinese clothing influence on the local clothing styles, especially the local elites; this also included the leaders who rebelled against the rule of the Chinese who typically wore Chinese-style clothing. The Elites wore clothing made of silk which were colourful and decorated while commoners wore plain hemp-based clothing. According to the Book of the Later Han by Fan Ye, the civilization of Lingnan started with Ren Yan and Xi Guang (both Han Officials in Jiaozhi and Jiuzhen respectively) who were credited for introducing hats and sandals to the people of Lingnan along with many other aspects, such as agriculture.

Non-Chinese immigrants were attracted to the Tang dynasty-ruled Annan, and non-Chinese migrants started settling in the neighbouring areas; the blending of Chinese culture, Mon-Khmer, and Tai-Kradai in northern Vietnam led to the development of the national majority, the Vietnamese people. The elites followed the Chinese clothing system more closely once the regions had been incorporated into the Chinese imperial system. During the thousand years of imperial domination, the Vietnamese adopted Chinese clothing, but local customs and styles were never lost and became incorporated with Vietnamese society.

=== Lý dynasty to Trần dynasty (1009–1400) ===
After Northern Vietnam became independent from China, the Vietnamese elites both followed the Chinese fashions and created distinctive, but still heavily Chinese-influenced local Vietnamese styles. The Chinese style dress gradually spread to Vietnamese commoners and among the people who were living in the surrounding regions which was being formally ruled by the Vietnamese; however, the form of the commoner clothing were distinct from those worn by the elite class. Almost all male commoners of the Việt ethnic and ethnic minorities started to wear Chinese style trousers and shirts.

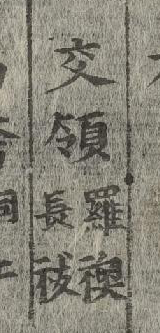
Nôm translation of giao lĩnh (交領), it reads "The jiaoling [garment] is the áo tràng vạt." (Giao lĩnh là áo tràng vạt; 交領羅襖長祓)

Vietnamese wore a round neck costume, which was made from 4 parts of cloth called áo tứ điên. Both men and women wore it. There are also other types such as: áo tràng vạt (long-flap robe). The garments "áo" (áo is for the upper part of body) are below knee length, and round neck garments have buttons when the long-flap robe is tied to the right.

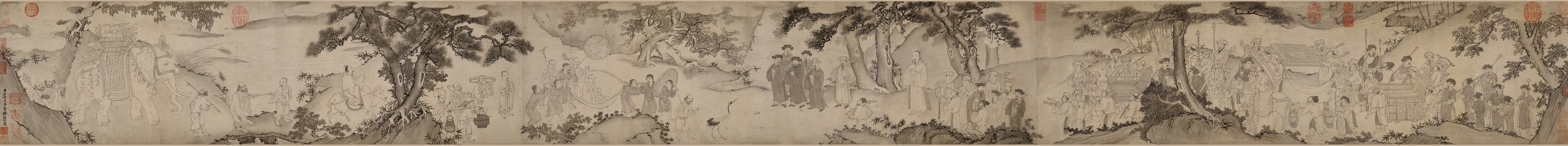
The Mahasattva Trúc Lâm Coming Out of the Mountains – Trần dynasty

Short hair or a shaven head was popular in Vietnam since the ancient period. Vietnamese men had shaven head or short hair during Trần dynasty. This can be seen in the painting "The Mahasattva Trúc Lâm Coming Out of the Mountains" which portrayed Emperor Trần Nhân Tông and his men during the Trần dynasty as well as the Chinese encyclopedia "Sancai Tuhui" from the 17th century. The convention was popular until the Fourth Chinese domination of Vietnam.

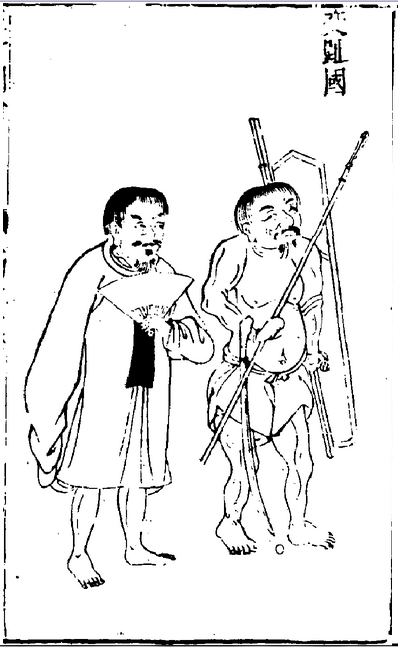
Vietnamese in Sancai Tuhui: short hair, wearing áo tứ điên (left) and loincloth (right)

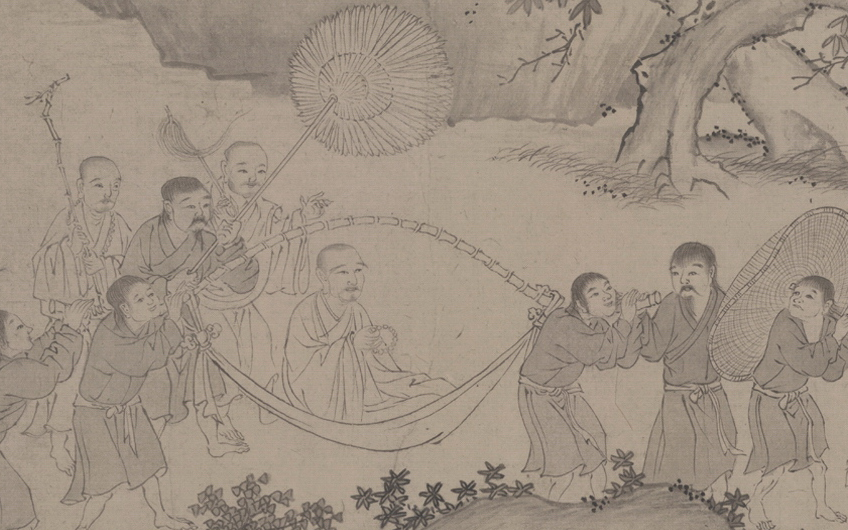
Trần dynasty clothing as depicted in "The Mahasattva Trúc Lâm Coming Out of the Mountains".

=== Hồ dynasty (1400–1407) ===
In the 1400s, Emperor Lê Quý Ly wrote a poem to describe his country and his government to the Ming dynasty envoys, explaining shared cultural status between Đại Ngu and Ming by referring to the Han and Tang dynasties during a time when Đại Việt was a part of China, "You inquire about the state of affairs in Annan. Annan’s customs are simple and pure. Moreover, official clothing is according to the Tang system. The rites and music that control intercourse between the ruler and the officials are those of the Han [...]".

=== Fourth Chinese domination of Vietnam (1407–1427) ===
When the Han Chinese ruled the Vietnamese in the Fourth Chinese domination of Vietnam, due to the Ming dynasty's conquest during the Ming–Hồ War they imposed the Han Chinese style of men wearing long hair on short-haired Vietnamese men. The Vietnamese were ordered to stop cutting their hair and instead to grow their hair long and switch to Han Chinese clothing within a month by a Ming official. Ming administrators said their mission was to civilize the unorthodox Vietnamese barbarians. Women had to wear Chinese style clothing. The Ming dynasty only wanted the Vietnamese to wear long hair and to stop teeth blackening so they could have white teeth and long hair like Chinese.

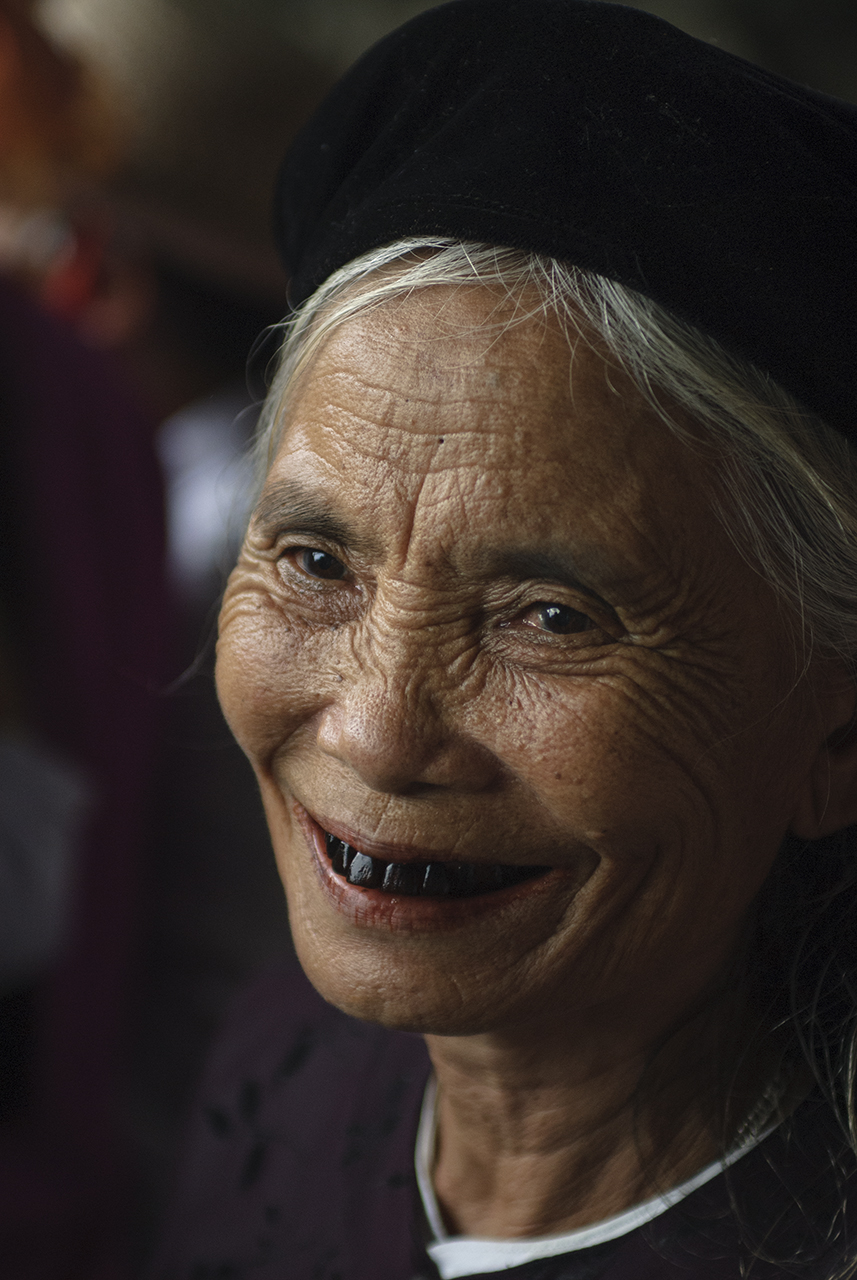
An old Kinh lady with blackened teeth (nhuộm răng đen).

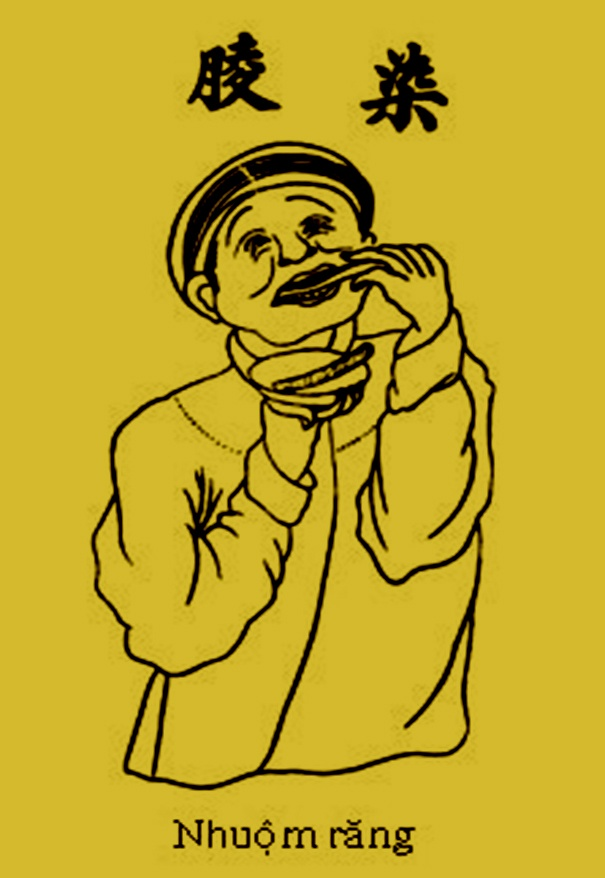
A picture from the book, Technique du peuple Annamite (Vietnamese: Kỹ thuật của người An Nam), depicting the Vietnamese custom of teeth blackening. It has chữ Nôm, 染𦝄 and Vietnamese alphabet, Nhuộm răng.

=== Later Lê dynasty (1428–1789) ===
In 1435, Nguyễn Trãi, a scholar official, and his colleagues compiled the Geography (Dư địa chí) based on the lessons he had taught to the prince, who then became Emperor Lê Thái Tông; his teachings also included how Vietnamese were different from their neighbours in terms of language and clothing customs: "The people of our land should not adopt the languages or the clothing of the lands of the Wu [Ming], Champa, the Lao, Siam, or Zhenla [Cambodia], since doing so will bring chaos to the customs of our land". They viewed the Ming as having been affected by Mongolian customs in terms of clothing customs (e.g. with their hair hanging down the back, white teeth, short clothing, long sleeves, and bright and lustrous robes and caps) despite returning to the ways of Han and Tang and the people of Lao as wearing Indian-style clothing like the robes of Buddhist monks "like the irrigated fields of dysfunctional families". Therefore, they considered that all those styles, including those of Champa and Khmer, should not be worn as they disregarded the customs of the Vietnamese, who continued to follow the rites of Zhou and Song dynasties: in the Dư địa chí, it is written that according to the scholar Lý Tử Tấn, during the reign of Trần Dụ Tông, Emperor Taizu of Ming bestowed a poem saying, "An Nan [Đại Việt] has the Trần clan, and its customs are not those of the Yuan [Mongols]. Its clothing and caps are in the classic pattern of the Zhou dynasty. Its rites and music follow the relationship between ruler and minister, as in the Song dynasty” and therefore Emperor Taizu promoted the ambassador of Đại Việt (Đoàn Thuận Thân) by 3 ranks to be equal that of Joseon.

The Lê dynasty encouraged the civilians to return to traditional customs: teeth blackening as well as short hair or shaved heads. A royal edict was issued by Vietnam in 1474 forbidding Vietnamese from adopting foreign languages, hairstyles and clothes like that of the Lao, Champa or the "Northerners" which referred to the Ming. The edict was recorded in the 1479 Complete Chronicle of Đại Việt of Ngô Sĩ Liên.

Two women and a child in Tonkin around the 1700s.

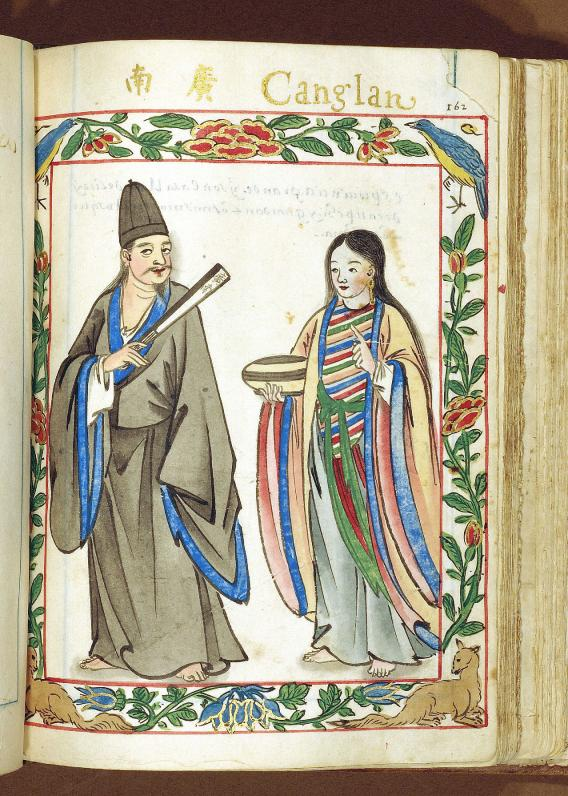
Vietnamese nobleman and wife from Quảng Nam (Đàng Trong) in 1595, Boxer Codex.

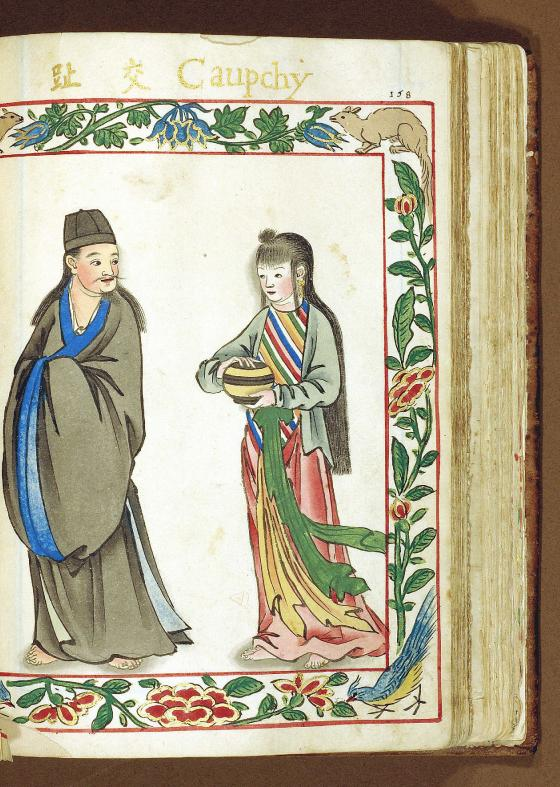
Vietnamese nobleman and wife from Hải Môn harbor (Đàng Ngoài) in 1595, Boxer Codex.

A section in the book, Lịch triều hiến chương loại chí (歷朝憲章類誌), states the clothing of the emperor during the Initial Lê dynasty:

黎太宗紹平四年。從梁登奏議。郊天吿廟。聖節正旦。御服衮冕。升寶廟。朔望常朝。御黄袍。衝天冠。升金座。

衝天卽幞頭也。惟两翅向上。謂之衝天。

Lê Thái Tông Thiệu Bình tứ niên. Tùng Lương Đăng tấu nghị, giao thiên cáo miếu, thánh tiết chính đán, ngự phục cổn miện, thăng bảo miếu. Sóc vọng thường phục, ngự hoàng bào, xung thiên quan, thăng kim tọa.

Xung thiên tức phốc đầu dã. Duy lưỡng sí hướng thượng. Vị chi Xung thiên.

In the fourth year of the Thiệu Bình era of Lê Thái Tông [1437], following the proposals presented by Lương Đăng: For the suburban sacrifice to Heaven and the announcement at the Imperial Ancestral Temple, the emperor's birthday, and New Year's Day, the emperor wore the gunmian (衮冕) and ascended the ceremonial throne. For the regular court audience on the first and fifteenth days of the month, the emperor wore the yellow robe (黄袍) and the xung thiên crown (衝天冠), and ascended the golden throne.

The xung thiên was the futou hat (幞頭), whose two wings pointed upward toward Heaven; hence it was called xung thiên.

— Phan Huy Chú (潘輝注), Lịch triều hiến chương loại chí (歷朝憲章類誌), Volume 20

=== Revival Lê dynasty ===
The dragon robe (áo Long Bào) was worn in Vietnam since the Restored Late-Lê period, Phan Huy Chú wrote in the Categorized Records of the Institutions of Successive Dynasties (Lịch triều hiến chương loại chí):

"Since the Restored Later-Lê era, for grand and formal occasions, (the emperors) always wore Xung Thiên hat and Long Bào robe...."

Through many portraits and images of rulers during the Ming, Joseon, and more recently, during the Nguyễn dynasty, one could see that this standard (the wearing of Long Bào) existed for a long period of time within a very large region.

==== Đàng Trong and Đàng Ngoài ====
Before 1744, people of both Đàng Ngoài (Tonkin) and Đàng Trong (Cochinchina) wore áo tràng vạt with a thường (a kind of long skirt; 裳). The tràng vạt dress appeared very early on in Vietnamese history, possibly during the first Chinese domination by Eastern Han, after Ma Yuan was able to finally defeat the Trưng Sisters’ rebellion. Those of the lower classes would prefer sleeves with reasonable widths or tight sleeves, and of simple colors. This stemmed from its flexibility in work, allowing people to move around with ease. Both male and female had loose long hair.

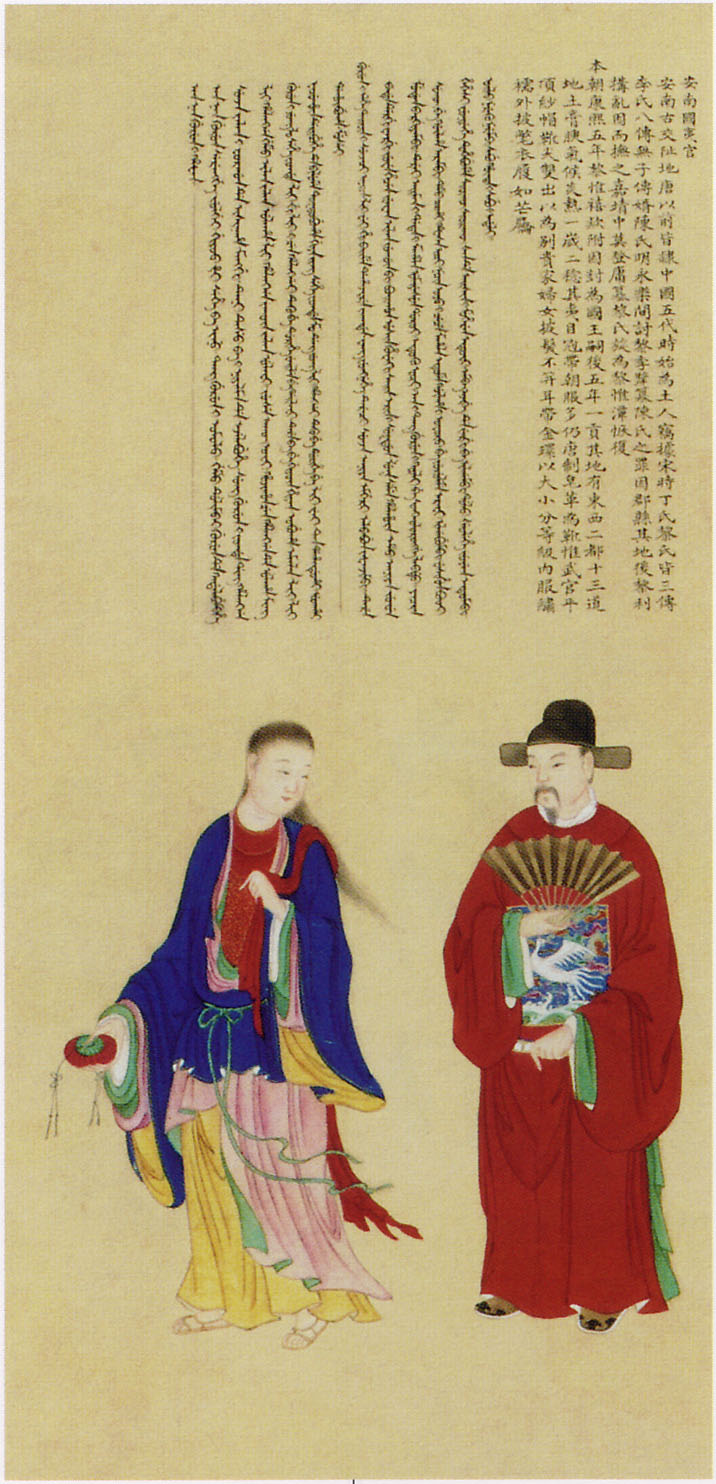
A servant woman and a mandarin of the Lê dynasty.

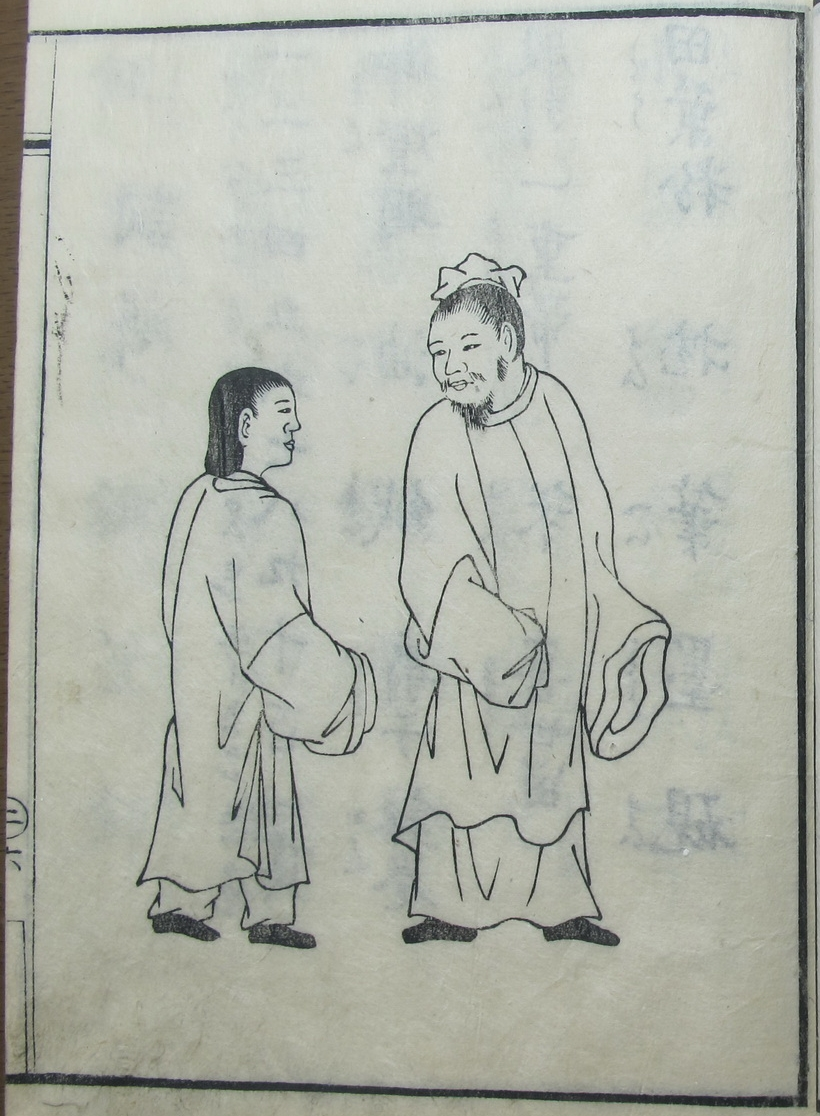
Clothing of people of Đàng Trong, 1675.

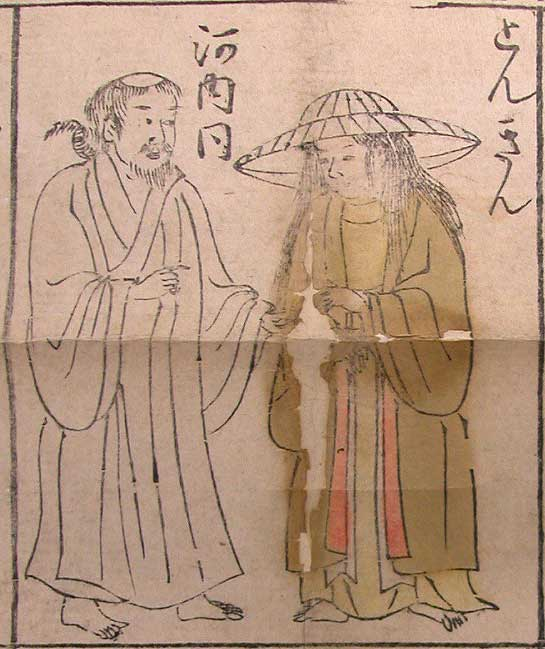
Clothing of people of Đàng Ngoài, 1645.

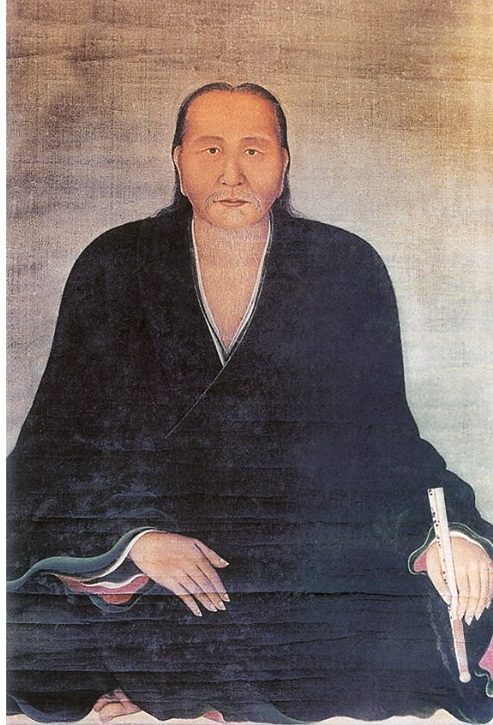
Portrait of Nguyễn Quý Đức in Đàng Ngoài. He was wearing a cross-collared robe (áo tràng vạt) and had loose long hair.

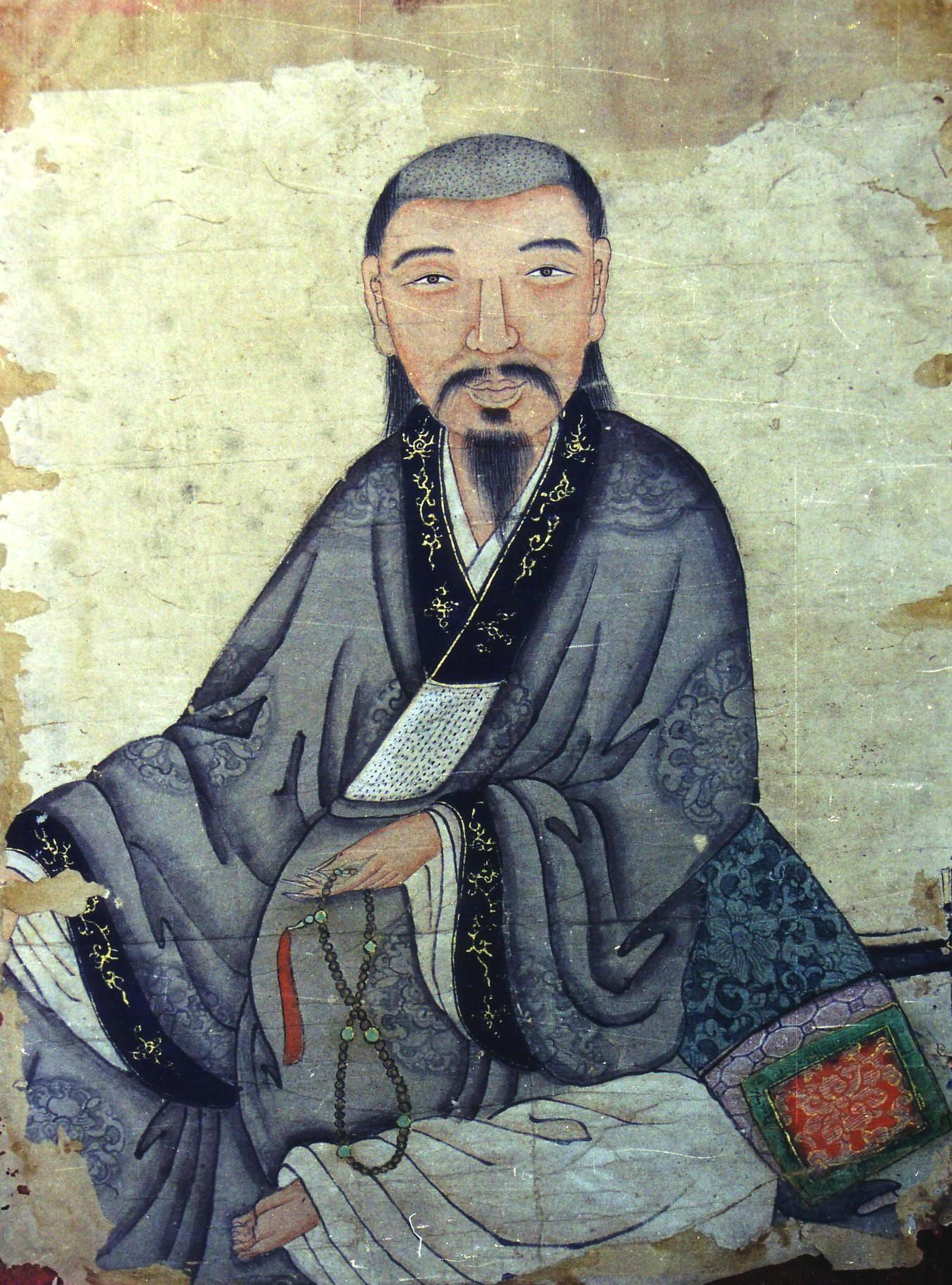
Portrait of Prince Tôn Thất Hiệp (Nguyễn Phúc Thuần) of Đàng Trong from the 17th century. He wears a cross-collared robe (áo tràng vạt).

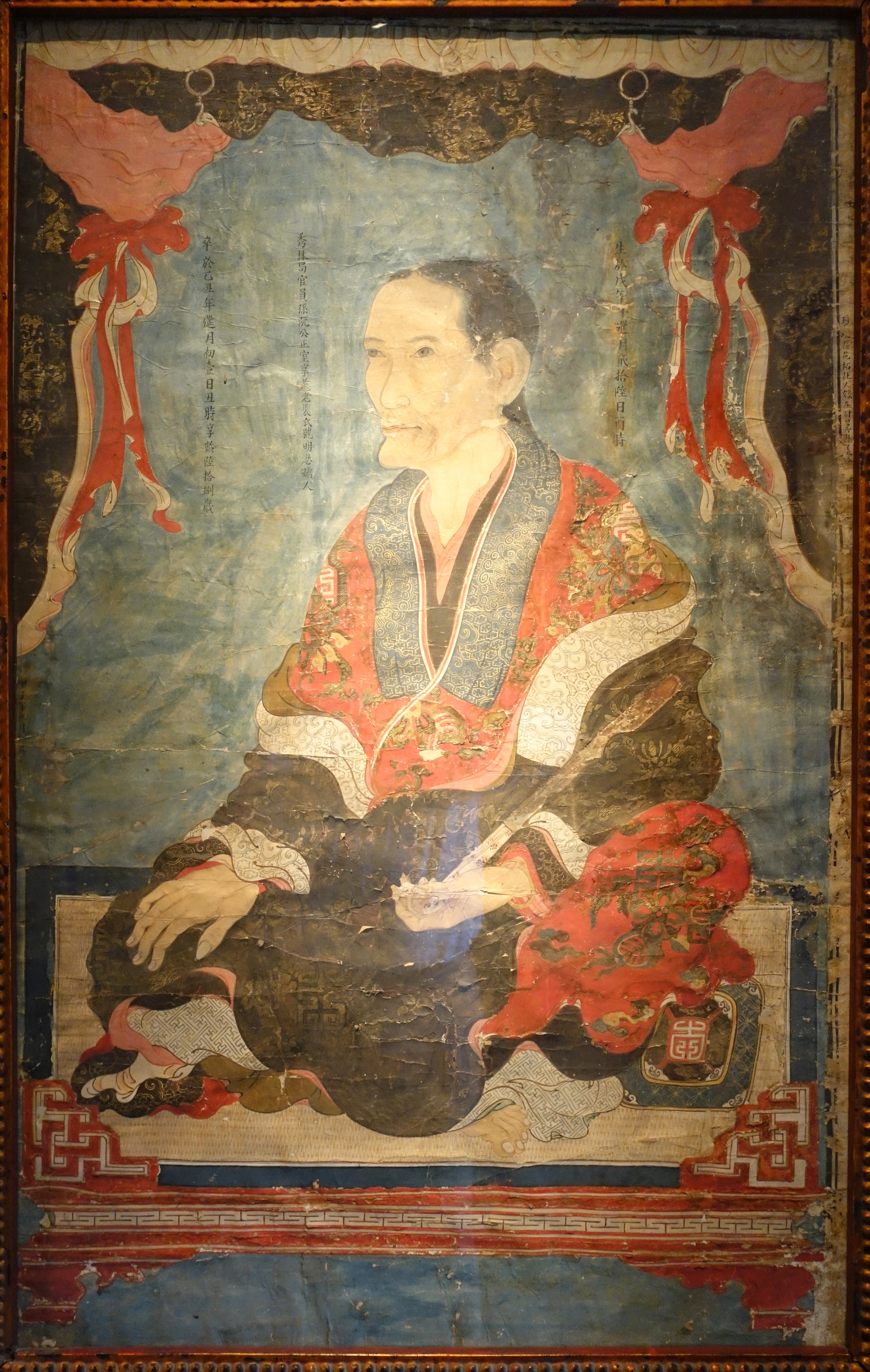
Portrait of Lady Minh Nhẫn Mrs. Bùi Thị Giác (1738-1805), Thai Binh province of Đàng Ngoài in Revival Lê dynasty.

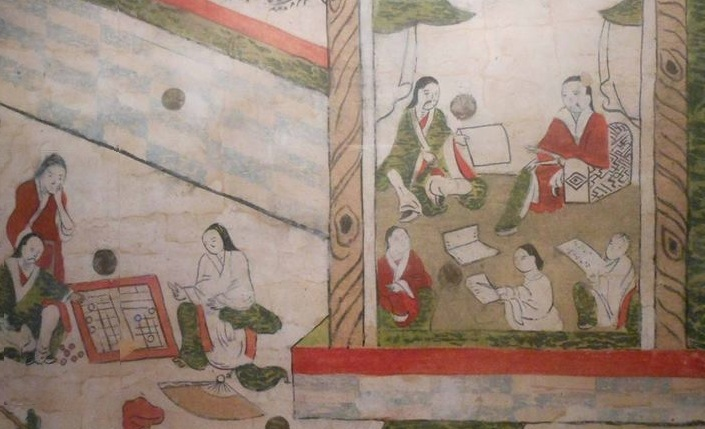
"Giảng học đồ" (講學圖 - Teaching): Scholars and students wear cross-collared robe (áo tràng vạt). Adults have loose and long hair.

The Nguyễn lords were key players in promoting Chinese-influenced clothing in Central and Southern Vietnam where they expanded their territories and extended control over all the territories which used to be ruled by Champa and the Khmer Empire. While expanding their territories, Vietnamese people immigrated to the south and the Nguyễn lords allowed Ming dynasty Chinese refugees to settle in those areas, thus creating a mixed society which was composed of Vietnamese, Chinese, and Cham peoples.

Clothing regulations of the Lê dynasty and Nguyễn dynasty. Lê dynasty regulations conformed to Ming dynasty regulations while Nguyễn dynasty preferred wearing mãng bào with designs based on Qing dynasty patterns.

===== Eighteenth-century clothing reform =====
Both Vietnamese and the Chinese brought their own clothing style in Đàng Trong (Huế) and continued to wear their clothing until a proclamation by Lord Nguyễn Phúc Khoát who decreed that all the people under his rule had to change their clothing into Ming/Qing-influenced Chinese clothing in order to make his people dressed differently from those under the rule of the Trịnh lords who wore áo tràng vạt, áo bù long, etc. As a result, the gown and skirt which was worn by the Vietnamese and which was common in the north was replaced by trousers and gown with Qing-influenced fasteners; this new form of clothing was described by Lê Quý Đôn as the predecessor to áo dài, áo ngũ thân which was composed of a 5-piece gown. In 1744, Lord Nguyễn Phúc Khoát of Đàng Trong (Huế) ordered both men and women at his court to wear trousers and a gown with buttons down the front. The members of the Đàng Trong court (southern court) were thus distinguished from the courtiers of the Trịnh Lords in Đàng Ngoài (Hanoi), who wore áo tràng vạt with long skirts.

景興五年，甲子，曉國公因乂安人傳言讖云：「八世還中都」，以自端國公至已適當八代，乃稱王號，取《三才圖繪》中冠服体製爲体式。
令武自掌營至該隊，文自管部至占候，訓導各依彩樣，衣皆用綵緞。貴者用蟒袍水波，其帽飭以金銀。
又，令二處男女攺用北國衣裳帶裙，以示変易，至使婦女皆窄袖短衣如男裝，則北國所無也。
三十餘年，人皆慣習，忘其本俗。

Cảnh Hưng ngũ niên, Giáp Tý, Hiểu Quốc công nhân Nghệ An nhân truyền ngôn sấm vân: “Bát thế hoàn Trung đô”, dĩ tự Đoan Quốc công chí dĩ thích đương bát đại, nãi xưng Vương hiệu, thủ Tam tài đồ hội trung quán phục thể chế vi thể thức

Lệnh võ tự Chưởng doanh chí Cai đội, văn tự Quản bộ chí Chiêm hậu, Huấn đạo các y thái dạng, y giai dụng thải đoạn. Quý giả dụng mãng bào thủy ba, kỳ mạo sức dĩ kim ngân.

Hựu, lệnh nhị xứ nam nữ cải dụng Bắc quốc y thường đái quần, dĩ thị biến dịch. Chí sứ phụ nữ giai trách tụ đoản y như nam trang, tắc Bắc quốc sở vô dã.

Tam thập dư niên, nhân giai quán tập, vong kỳ bản tục.

In the fifth year of the Cảnh Hưng era, the year Giáp Tý (1744), Hiểu Quốc Công, taking as his pretext the fact that someone from Nghệ An had transmitted a prophetic saying: “After eight generations, we shall return to the capital.” Counting from the generation of Đoan Quốc Công (Nguyễn Hoàng) down to the present Nguyễn Phúc Khoát, eight generations had indeed elapsed. He thereupon adopted the title of Vương (王; King) and took the forms and regulations for making robes and headgear illustrated in the Sancai Tuhui (三才圖繪) as the standard.

He ordered all the military officials, from encampment commandant down to the captain, and the civil officials, from heads of departments down to astrologers and instructors, to follow the colors and forms [of the clothing] according to the illustrations, with all garments made of silk and satin in five colors. Persons of rank wore mangpao with water-wave designs, while their caps were ornamented with gold and silver.

He further ordered the men and women of the two regions [Thuận Hóa and Quảng Nam] to change to clothing in the style of the Northern Kingdom [China], in order to signify the transformation [of their dress].

In particular, he caused the women to wear short garments with narrow sleeves (窄袖短衣), like men's clothing; a style which was entirely absent in the Northern Kingdom [China].

After more than thirty years, everyone had become accustomed to this manner of dress and had forgotten their original customs.

— Lê Quý Đôn (黎貴惇), Phủ biên tạp lục (撫邊雜錄), Volume 6

=== Nguyễn dynasty (1802–1945) ===
Regulations for regular court attire. Phạm Phú Thứ (Paris delegation; 1863) can be seen wearing a văn công hát (文公) with a võng cân, áo tràng vạt with a white collar, and a crane mandarin square (仙鶴). He is holding a hốt.

During unified period of Vietnam, the people in the northern and southern regions of Vietnam (i.e. previously Champa) continued to wear their local ethnic clothing. In the Southern regions, the people continued to wear their local clothing and became increasingly similar whereas in the northern regions, the clothing worn was very varied. When the Vietnamese started to assimilate the majority of the Cham and the Khmer Krom living in their new conquered southern territories; and the Vietnamese-ification of the Cham and the Khmer Krom lead to them adopting Vietnamese style clothing while at the same time retaining several distinctive ethnic elements.

Áo ngũ thân (predecessor of the current áo dài, which made of 5 parts) with standing collar and trousers was forced on Vietnamese people by the Nguyễn dynasty. Skirts (váy) were banned due to Emperor Minh Mệnh's extreme Neo-Confucianism. However, it was up to the 1920s in Vietnam's north area in isolated hamlets where skirts were worn.

The Vietnamese had adopted the Chinese political system and culture during the 1,000 years of Chinese rule, but after the Qing conquest of China, Han Chinese were forced to adapt to Manchurian customs like wearing a queue. So the Vietnamese viewed their surrounding neighbors like Khmer and the Han Chinese under the Qing dynasty as barbarians and themselves as a small version of China (the Middle Kingdom) who still maintained Han culture (civilised culture). By the Nguyễn dynasty, the Vietnamese themselves were ordering the Khmer to adopt Han Chinese culture by ceasing "barbarous" habits like cropping hair and ordering them to grow it long besides making them replace skirts with trousers.

Áo tràng vạt was still worn during Nguyễn dynasty. Other styles of clothing were also created during this time such as áo nhật bình and the áo tấc (formal wear for rituals and formal occasions).

Áo dài was created when tucks which were close-fitting and compact were added in the 1920s to áo ngũ thân. The Chinese-influenced clothing in the form of trousers and tunic were mandated by the Nguyễn dynasty. The Chinese Ming dynasty, Tang dynasty, and Han dynasty clothing was referenced in order to be adopted by the Vietnamese military and bureaucrats by the Nguyễn Lord, Nguyễn Phúc Khoát (Nguyễn Thế Tông) from 1744.

Imperial and noble clothing

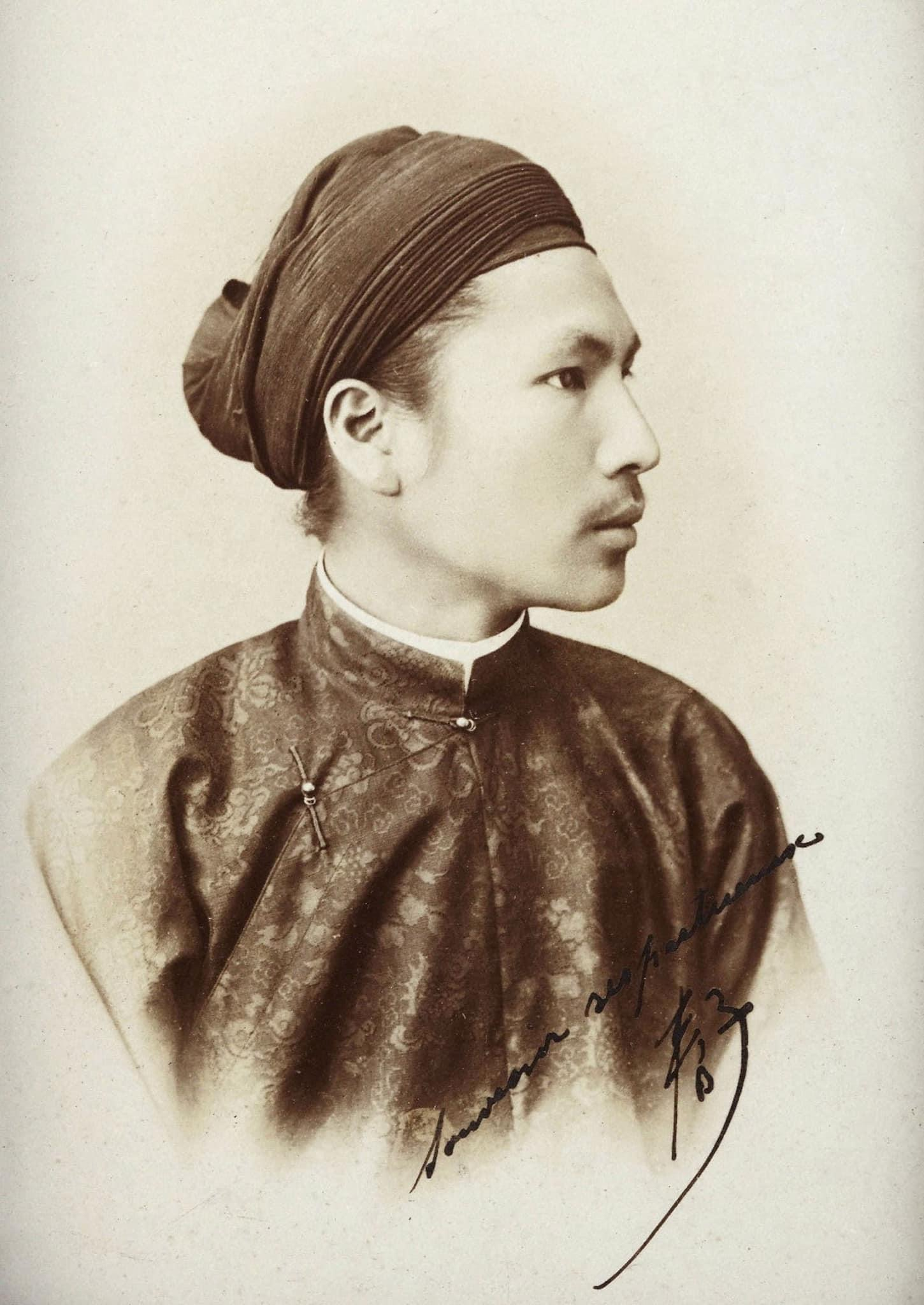
Emperor Hàm Nghi.

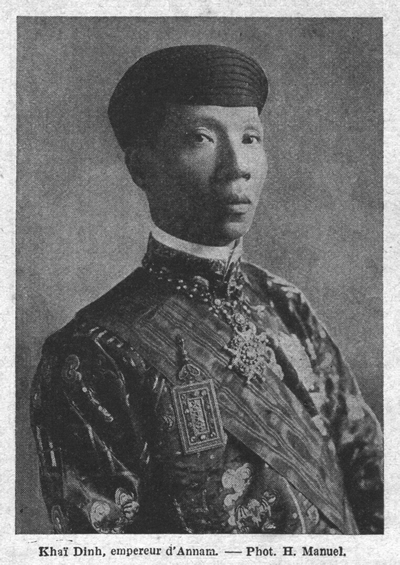
Emperor Khải Định.

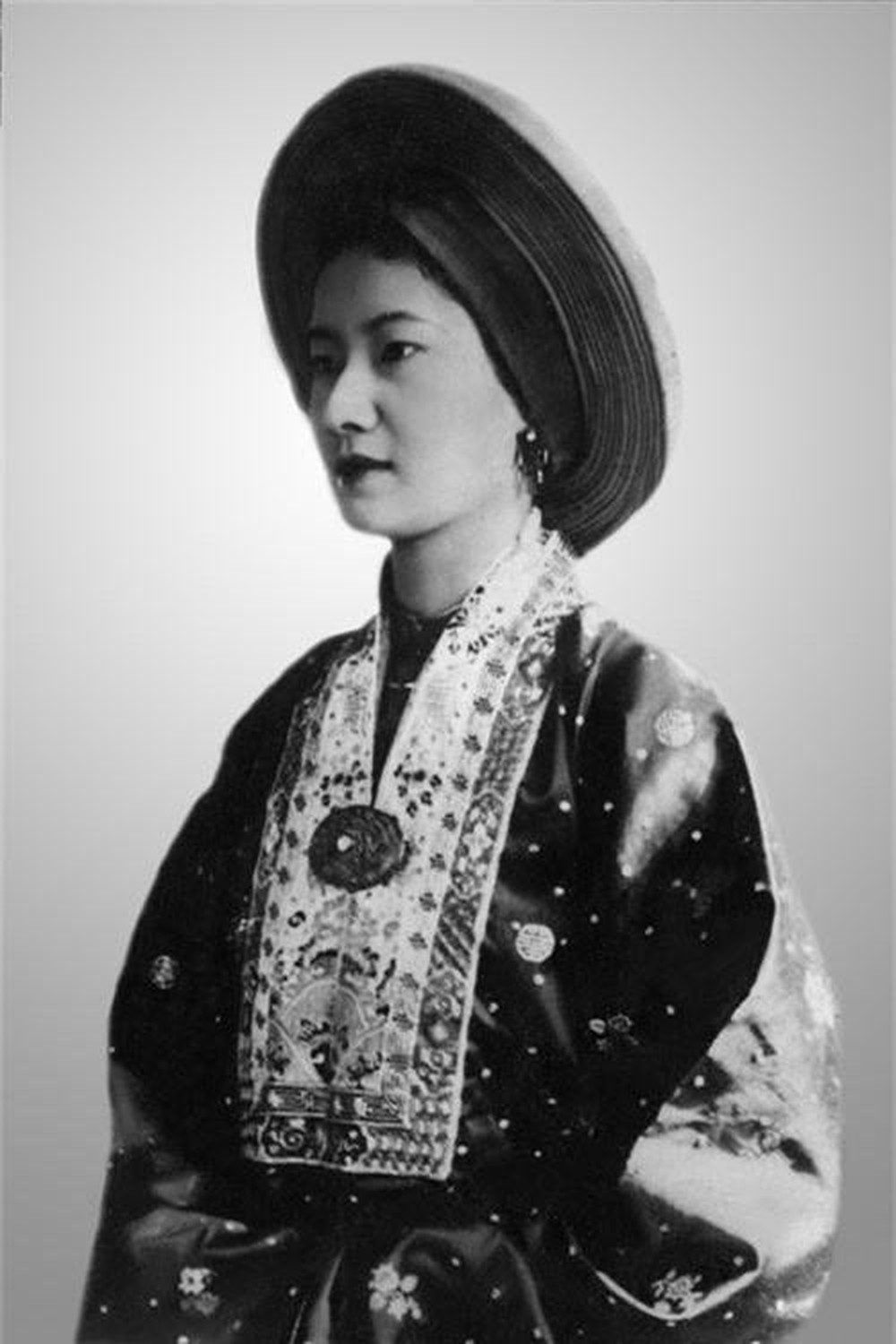
Empress Nam Phương in áo nhật bình and khăn vành dây.

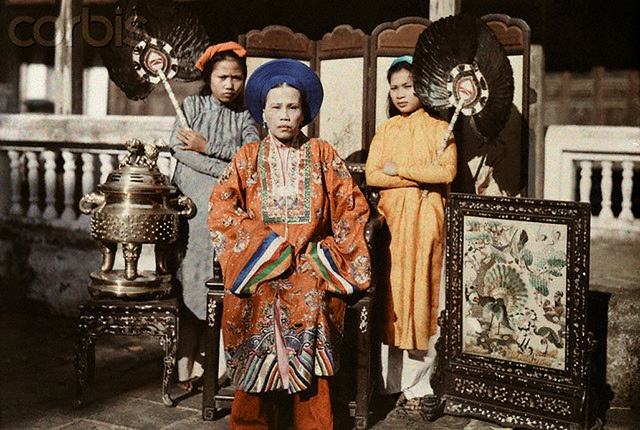
Princess Mỹ Lương.

Vietnamese ambassadors in Paris.

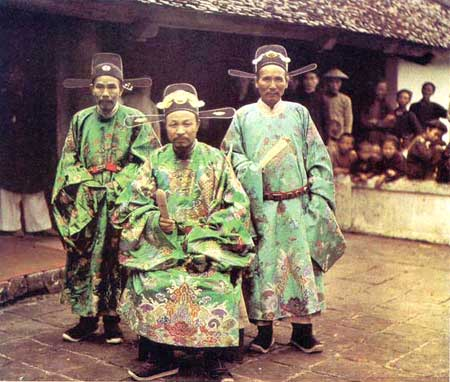
Nguyễn dynasty mandarins.

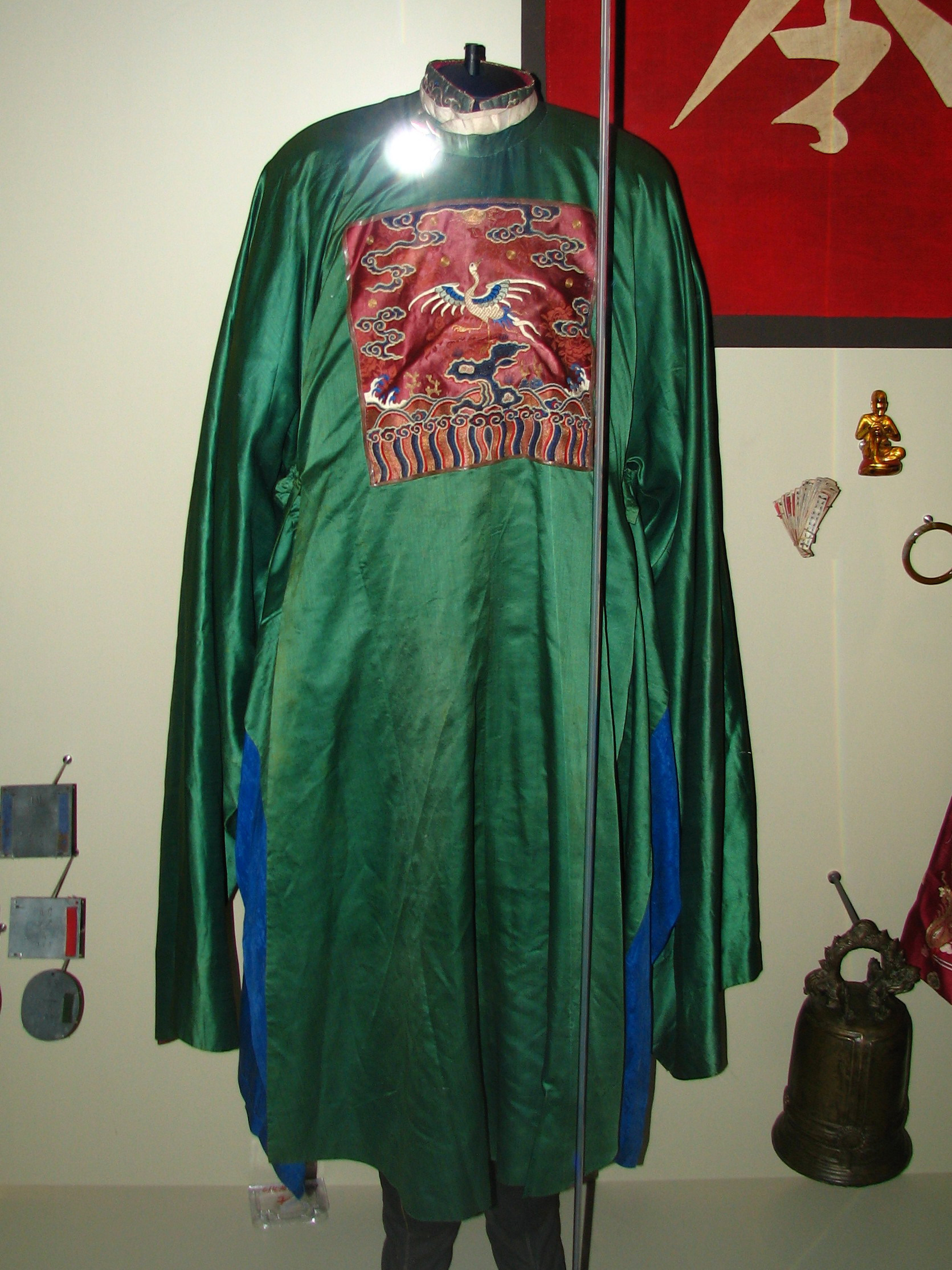
The mandarin uniform of Nguyễn Tri Phương.
Artifacts of Nguyễn dynasty

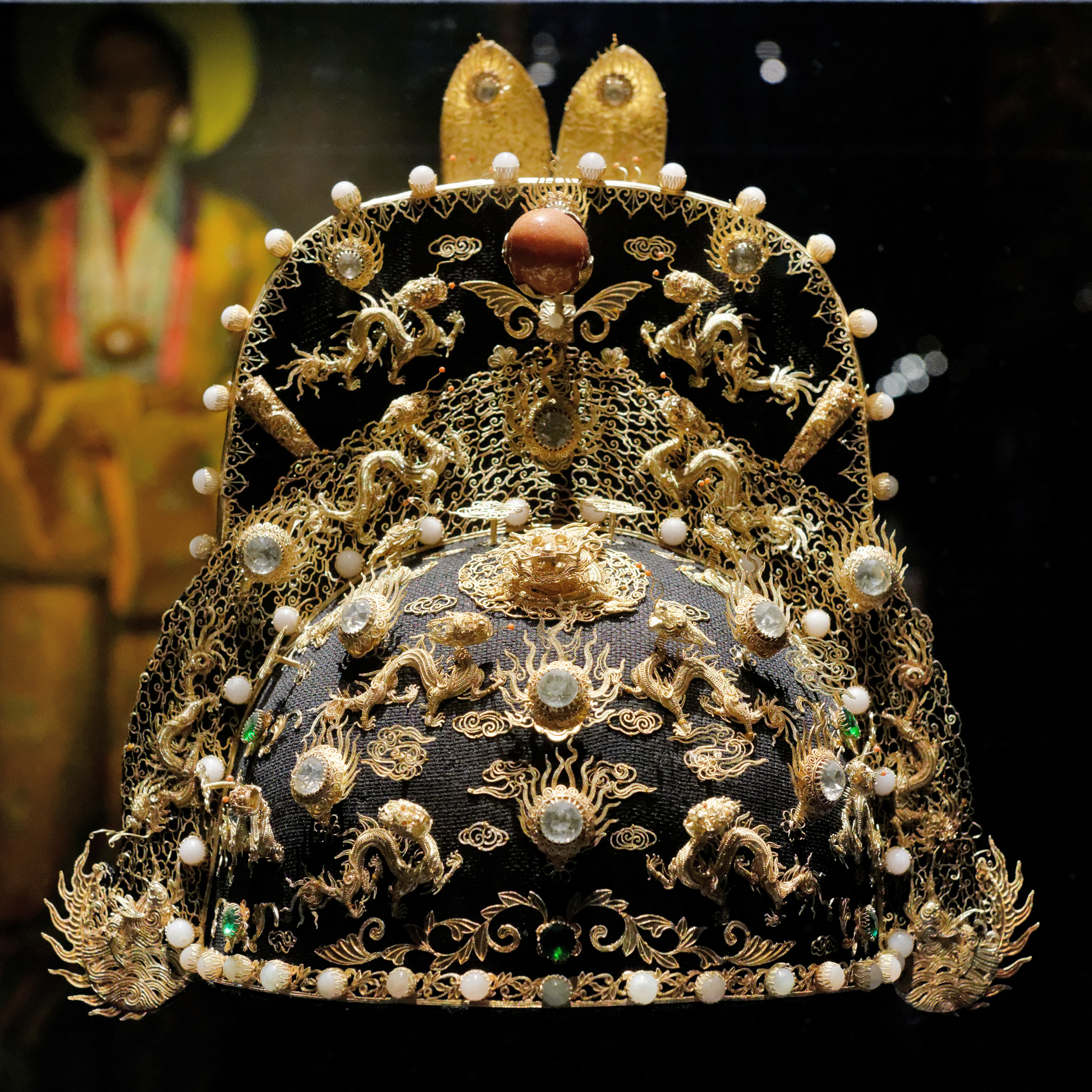
Imperial headgear "Mũ Xung Thiên"

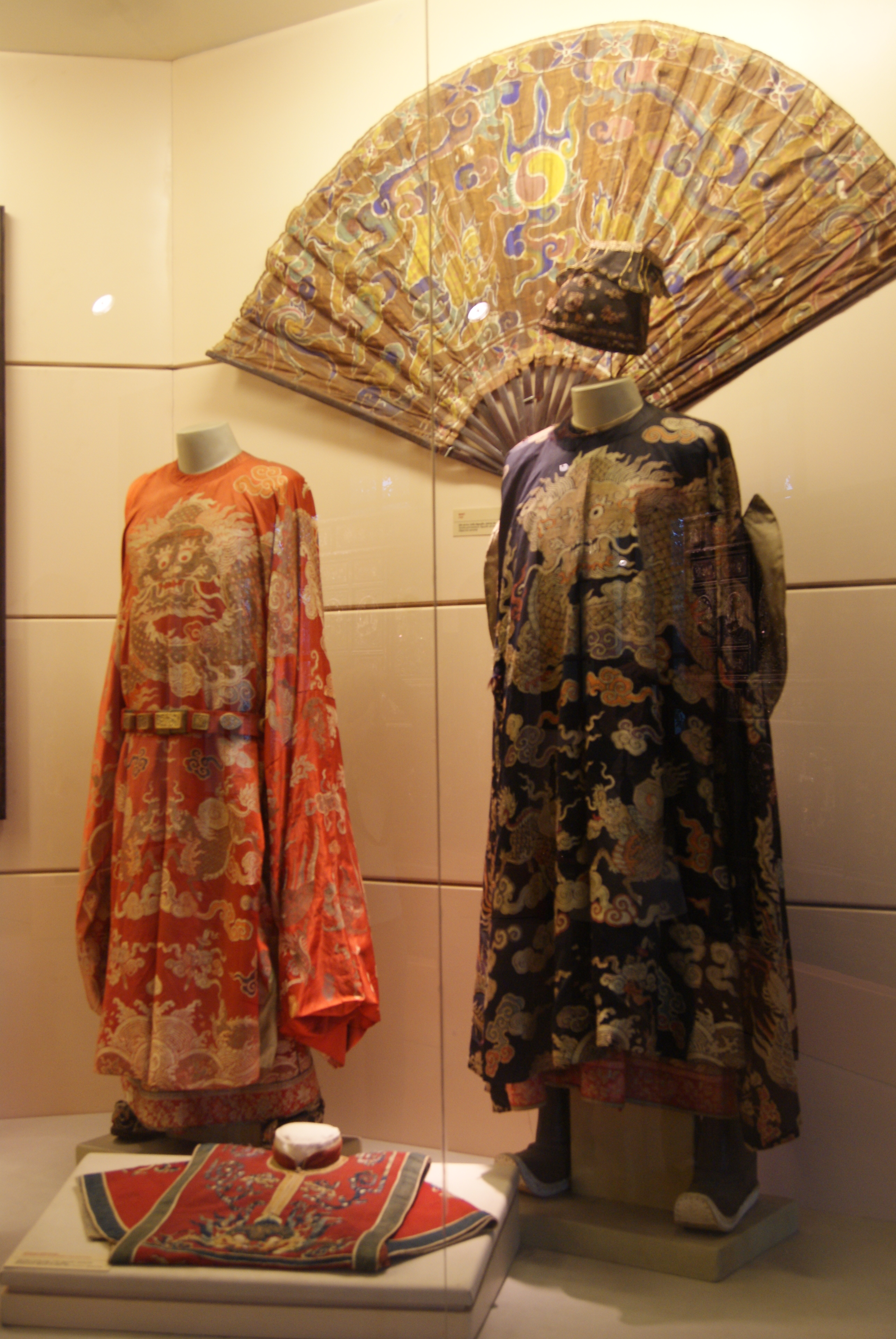
Court attires of the Nguyễn dynasty

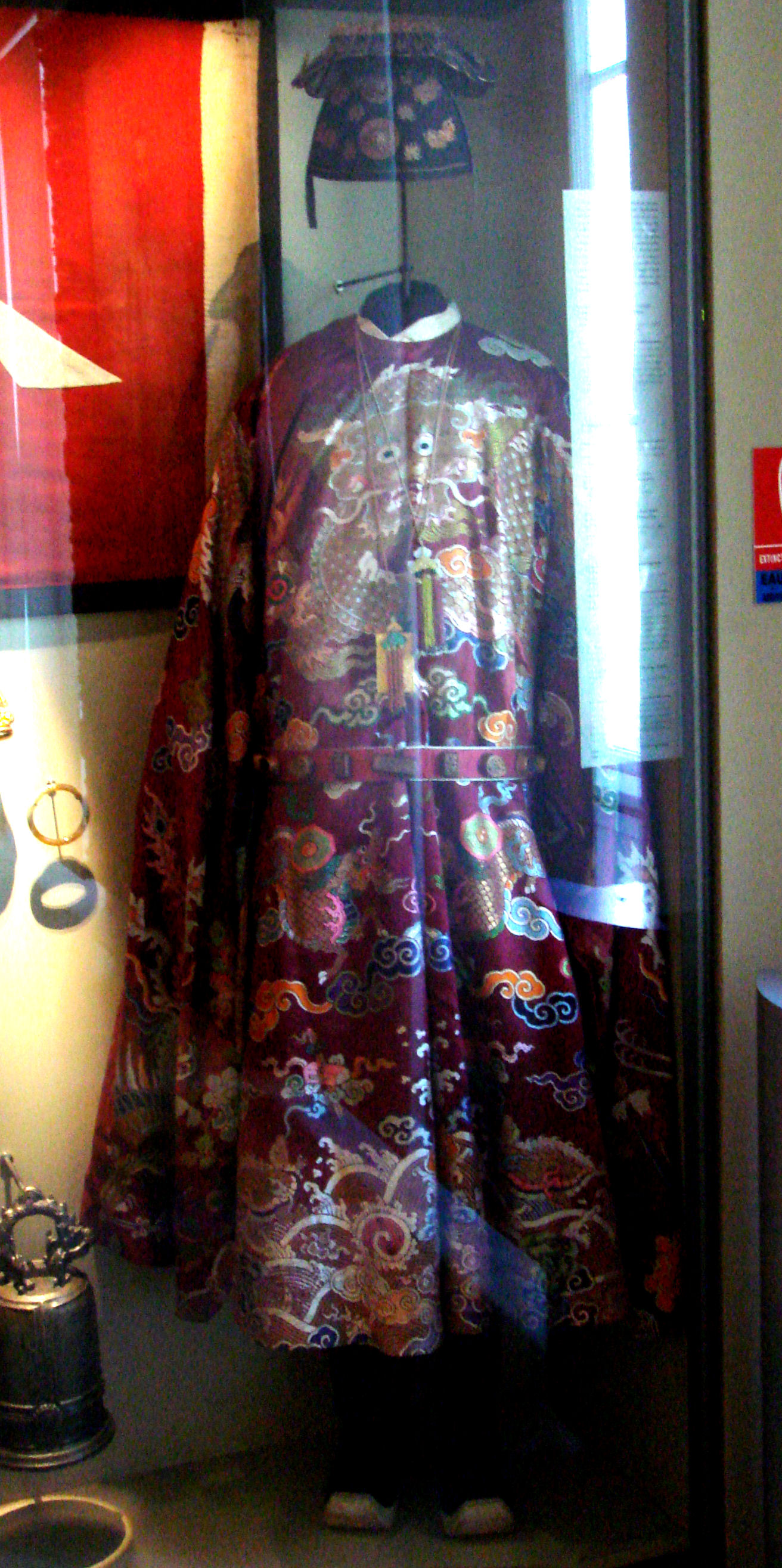
Ceremonial dress of Marshall Nguyễn Tri Phương (Note: The dress was taken as a trophy by Garnier in the capture of Hanoi in 1873)

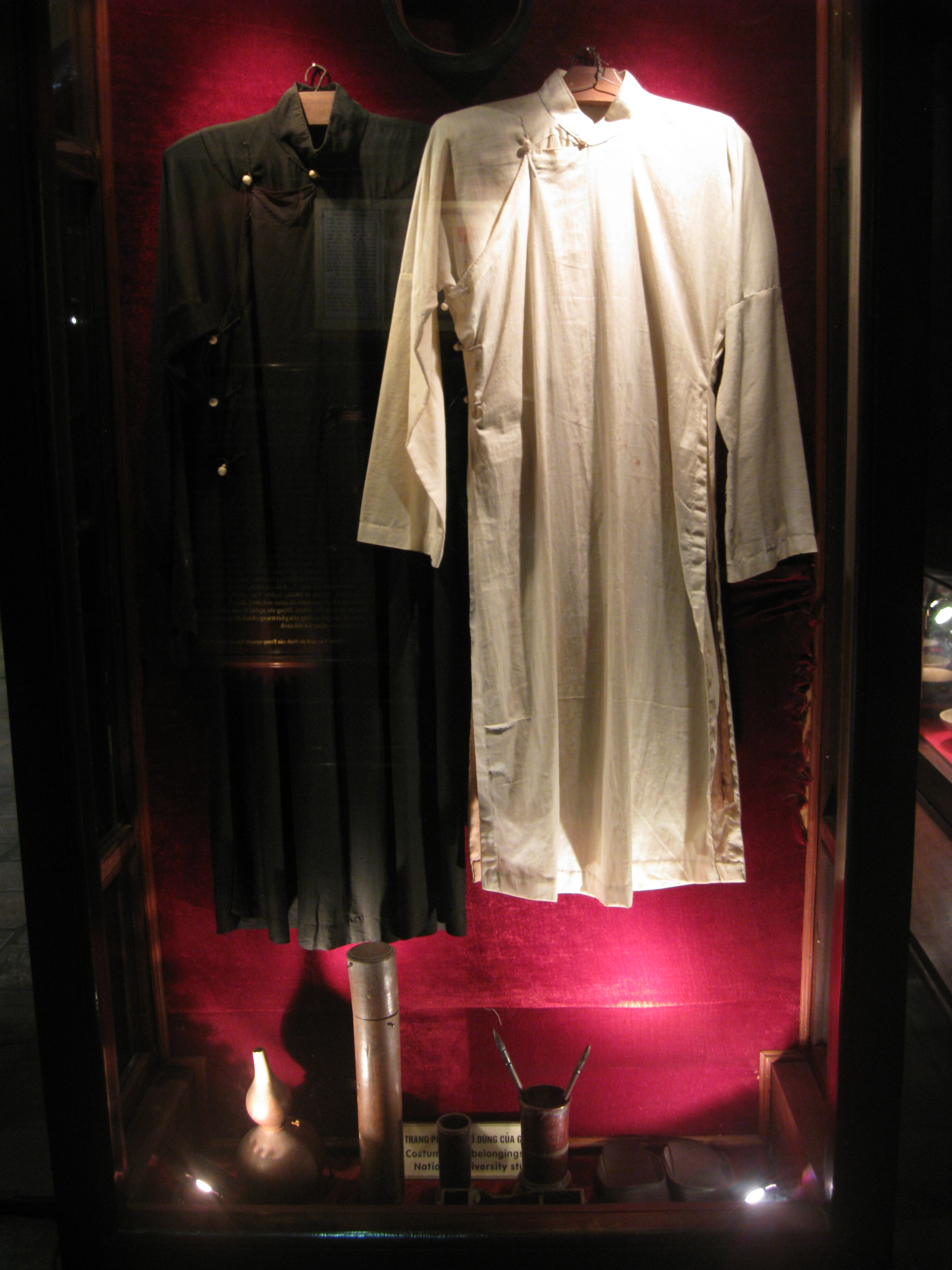
Student uniforms of the imperial academy

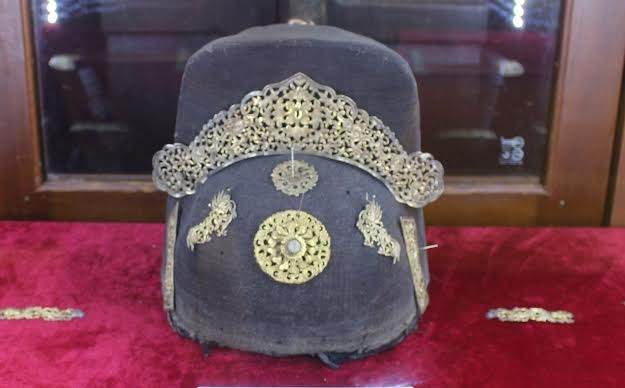
19th century Phốc Đầu cap, with ornamented gold Kim Bác Sơn

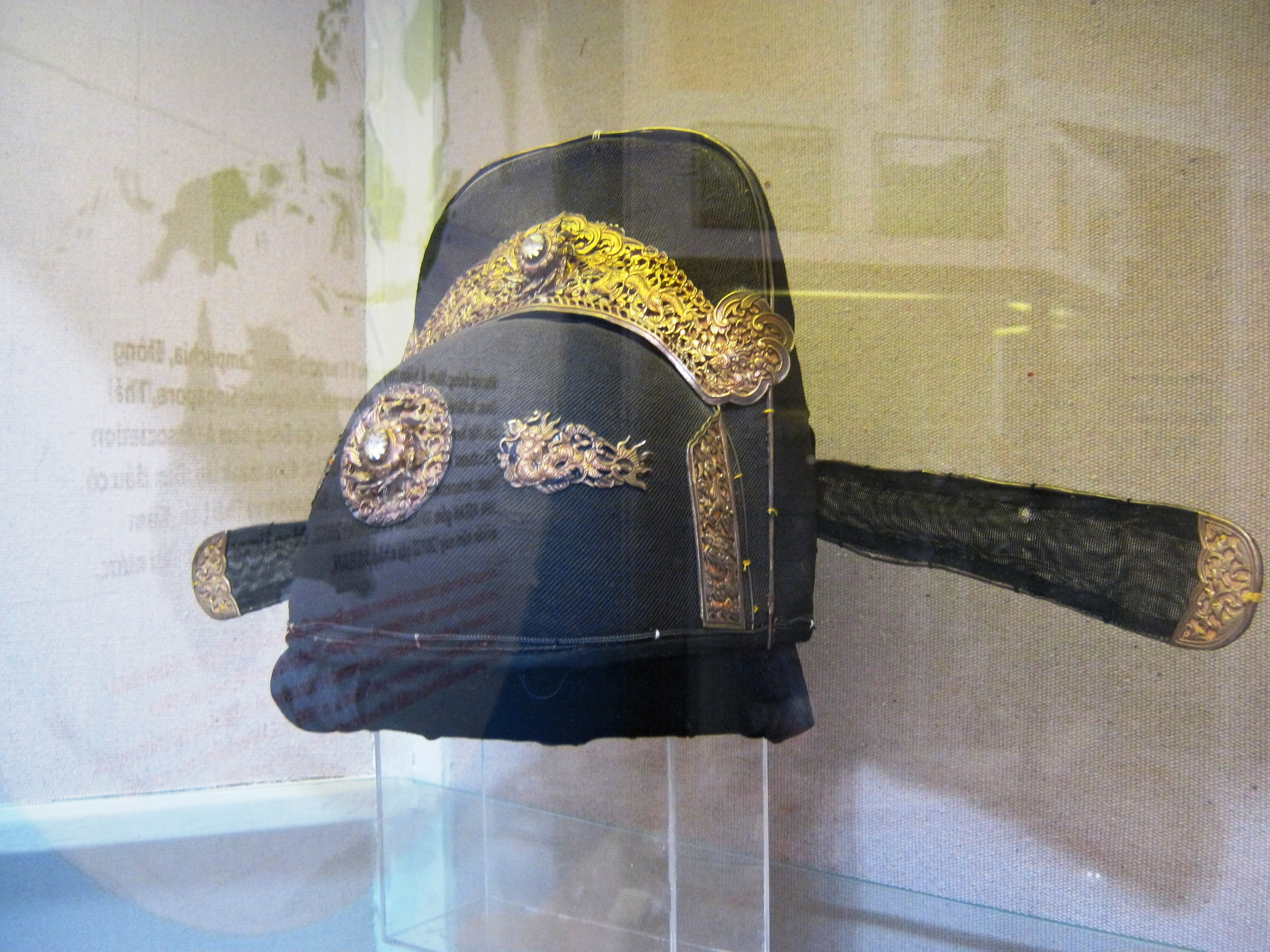
A mũ cánh chuồn made out of metal and horse hair during the 19th century, Nguyễn dynasty.
Common outfits of the Nguyễn dynasty

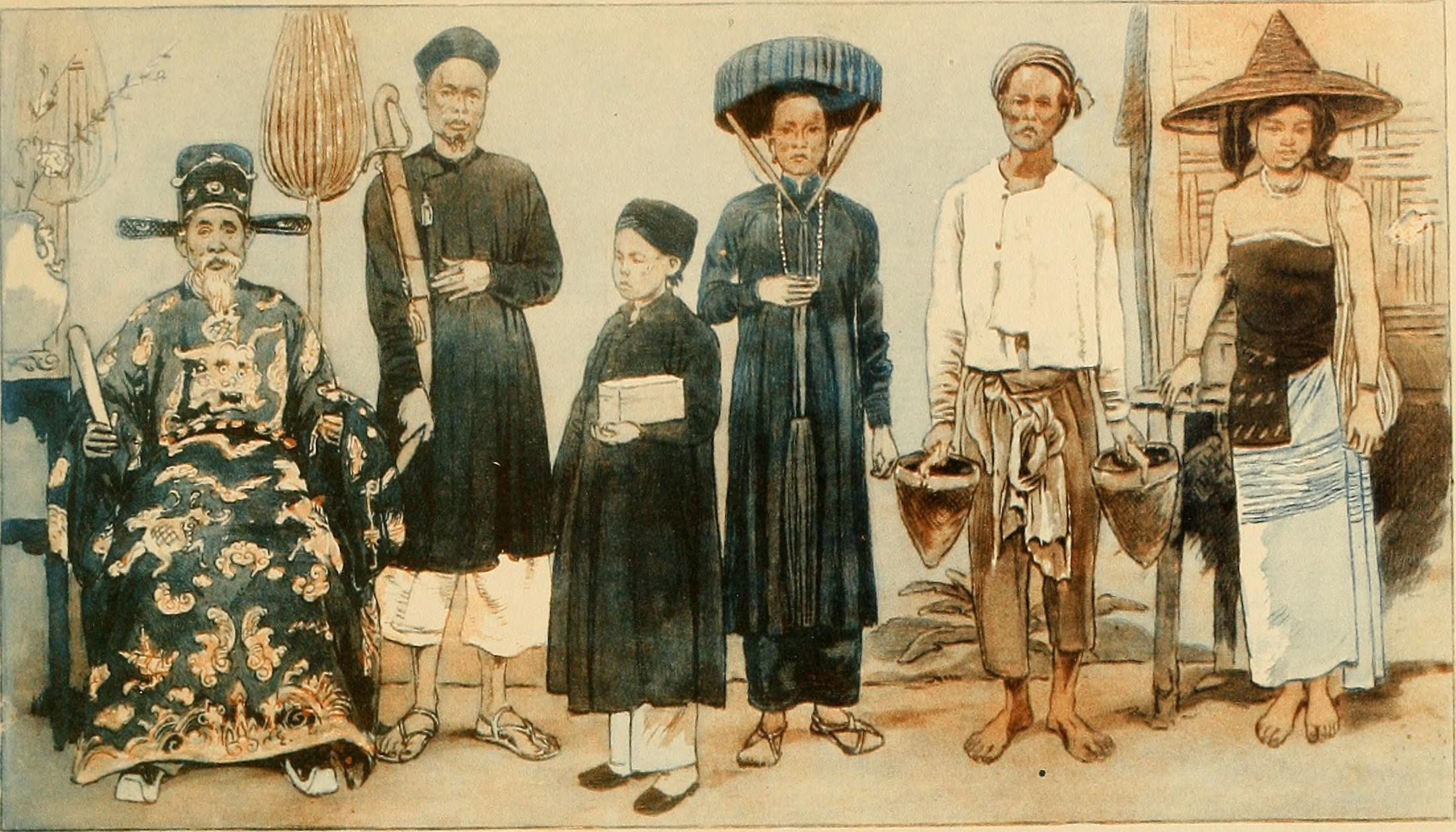
A painting depicting traditional clothing during the Nguyễn dynasty.

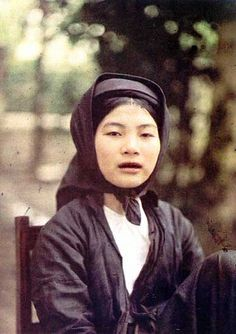
A northern Vietnamese girl with black teeth sitting on a chair.

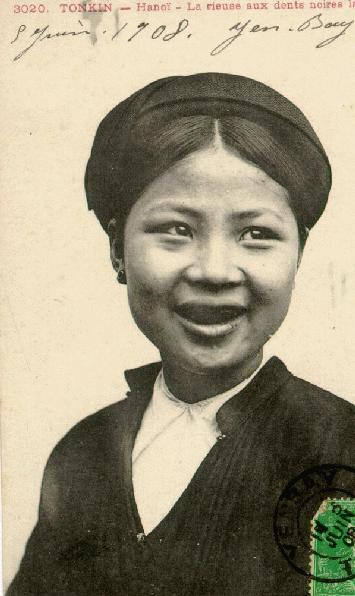
A northern Vietnamese girl smiling.

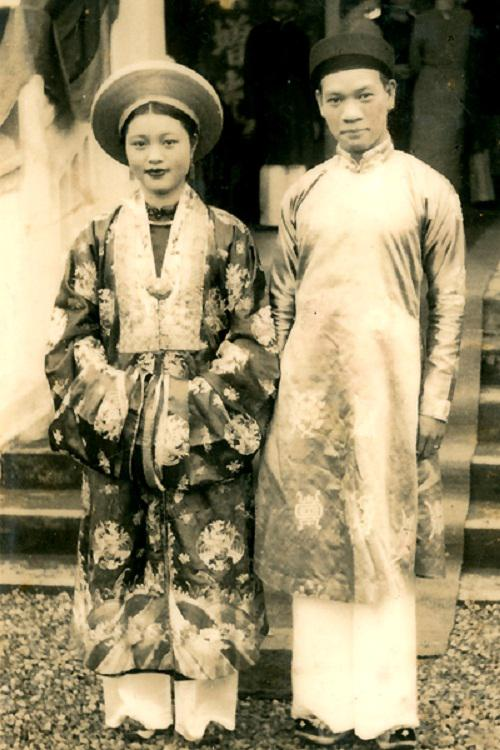
A picture depicting traditional wedding costumes.

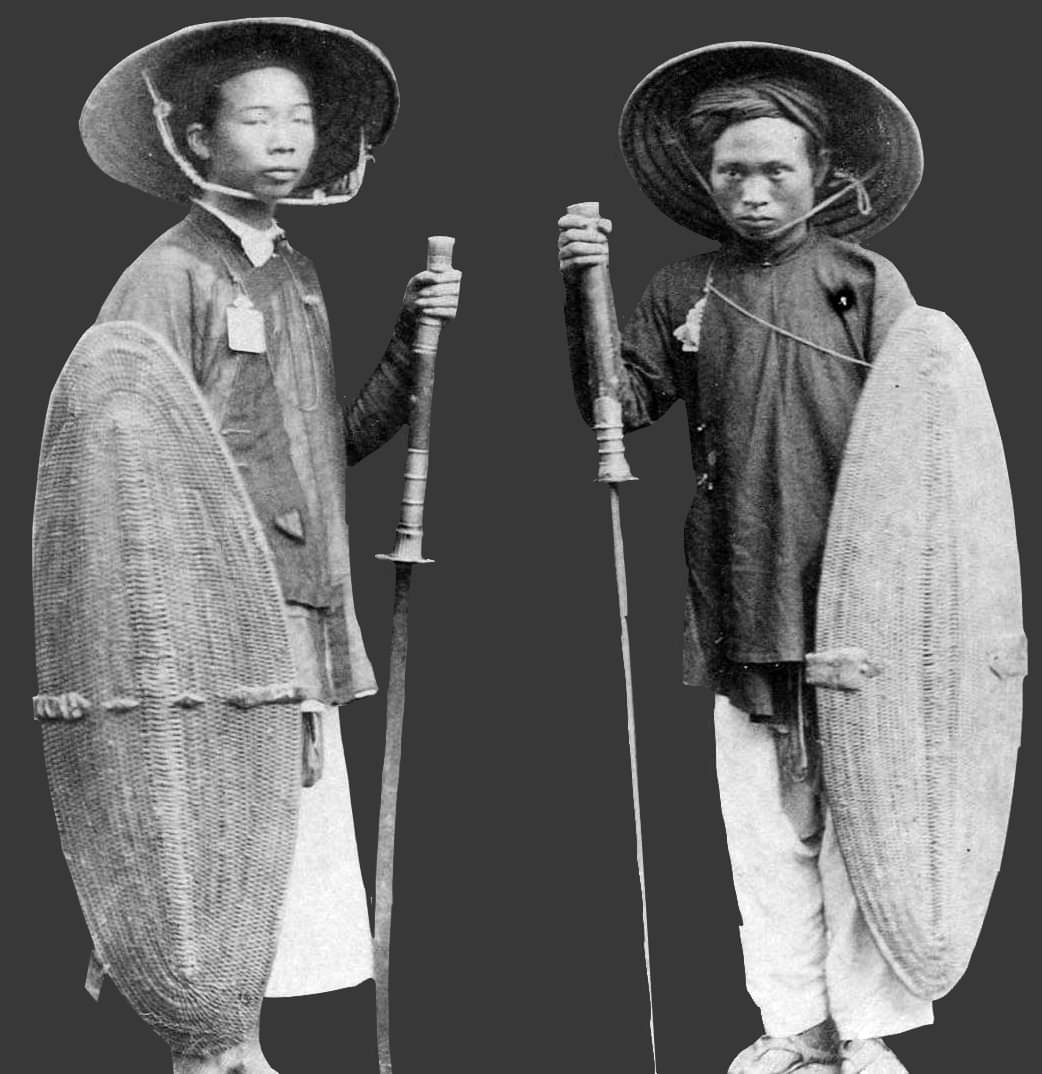
Nguyễn dynasty soldiers wearing khăn vấn under nón lá.

=== Twentieth century ===
From the twentieth century onward, Vietnamese people began wearing Western clothing due to modernisation and French influence. Áo dài was briefly banned after the fall of Saigon, but was reintroduced back into the scene. It is worn in white by high school girls, often as part of school uniform in Vietnam. It is also worn by female receptionists and secretaries. Styles can differ in Northern and Southern Vietnam. The most popular type of Vietnamese clothing today, is áo dài for men and women, and suits or sometimes áo gấm (modified áo dài) for men.

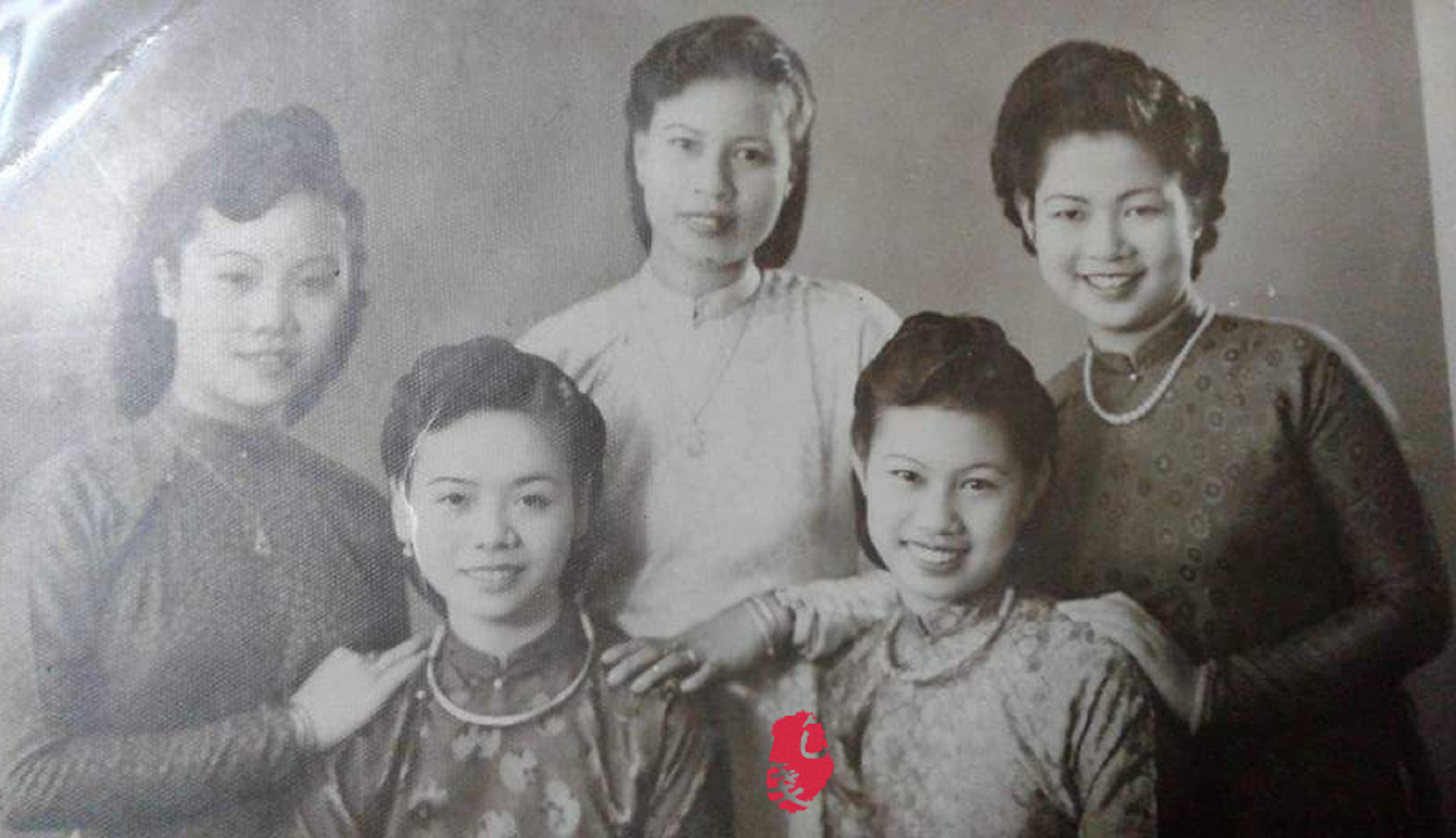
Áo dài worn by women in Hanoi, 1950s

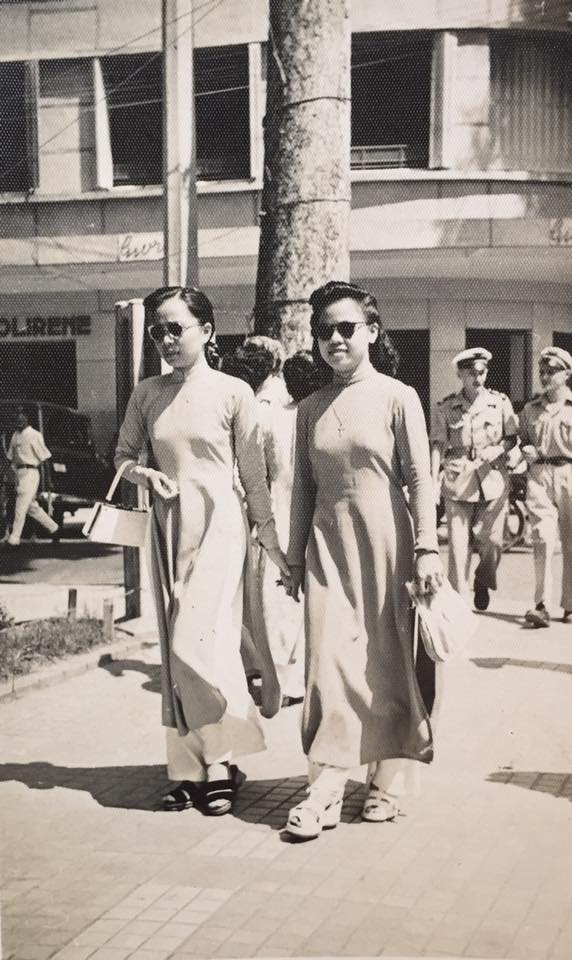
Two women wearing áo dài walking in Saigon, 1947.

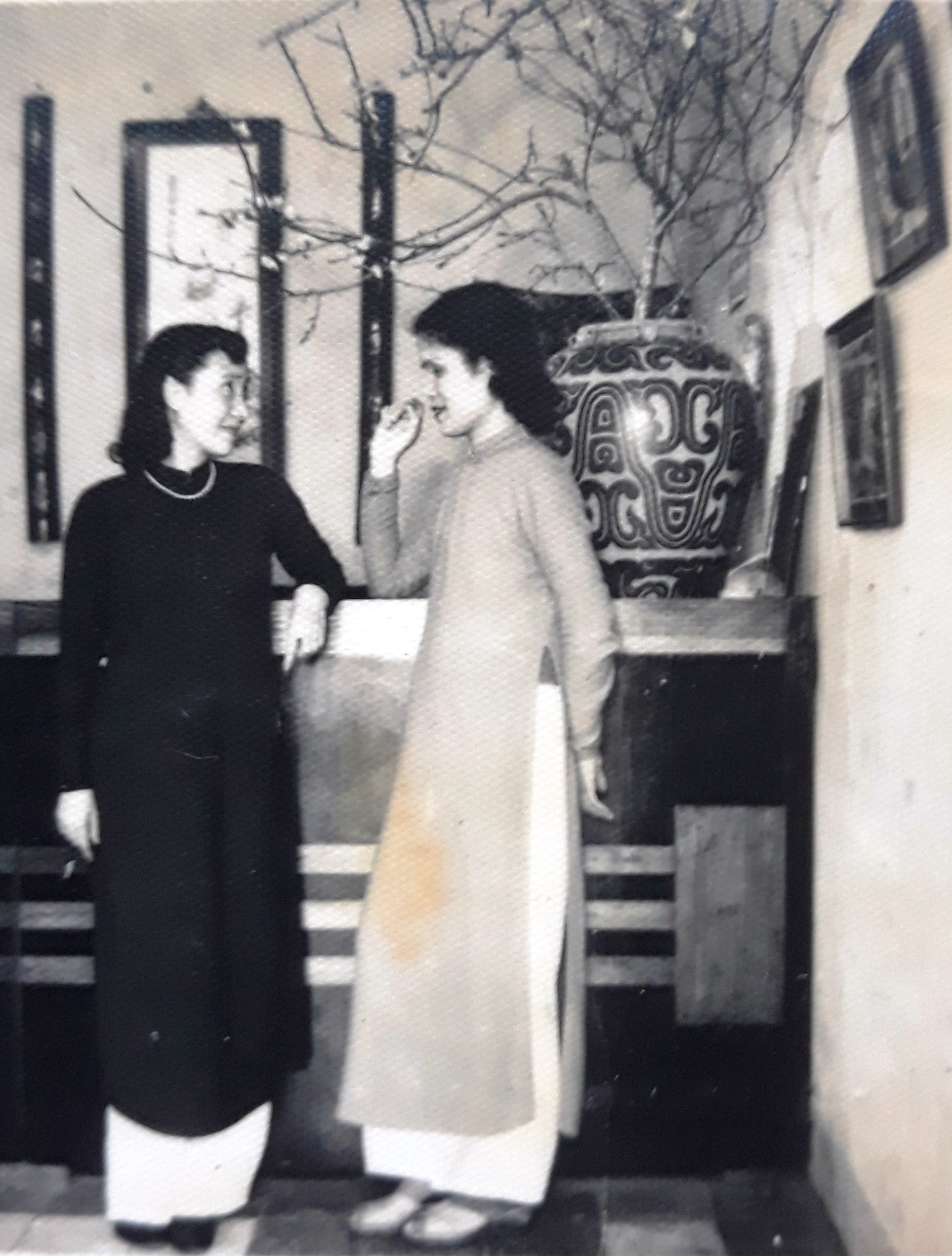
Two women in áo dài chatting.

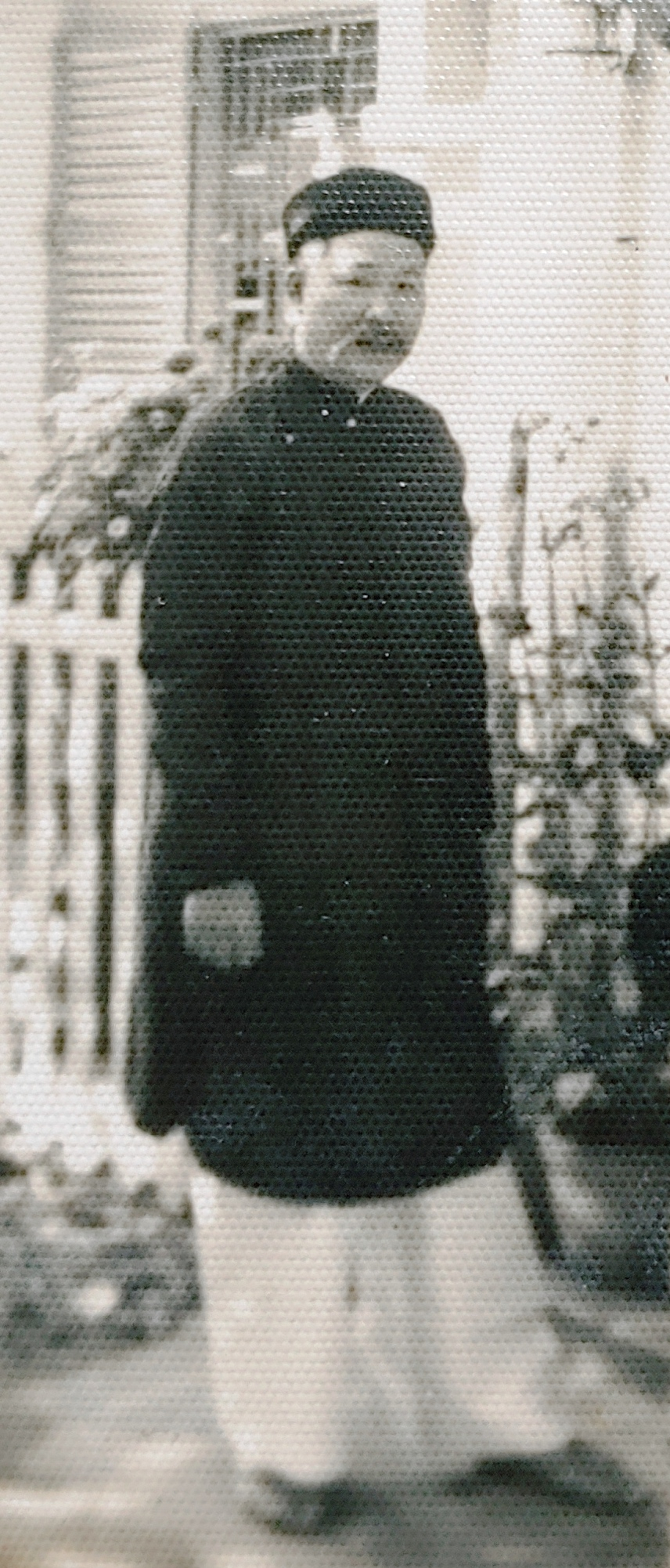
A man wearing an áo dài

=== Twenty-first century ===
In the 21st century, some companies and individuals are working on reviving, preserving, and upholding Vietnamese traditional culture, including Vietnamese clothing and designs. In 2013, researcher Trần Quang Đức published the book Ngàn năm áo mũ, marking the first step in restoring traditional costumes in Vietnam. Currently, there are many companies that research and reproduce traditional Vietnamese clothing, for example, a company called Ỷ Vân Hiên started to provide tailoring services of ancient Vietnamese clothing which included áo ngũ thân and áo tràng vạt. Ỷ Vân Hiên company largely reproduces clothing worn in the Nguyễn dynasty period. Other tailoring companies, such as Trần Thị Trang's company specializes in making ancient Vietnamese clothing which was typically worn between the Ngô dynasty and the Nguyễn dynasty. Painter Cù Minh Khôi and his friends launched the Hoa Văn Đại Việt project which digitized 250 ancient Vietnamese decorative patterns which spanned from the Lý dynasty to Nguyễn dynasty and applied them to variety of modern products such as keychains, calendars, T-shirts, and lucky money packets.

In 2018, a book called Dệt Nên Triều Đại in Vietnamese language and Weaving a Realm in English language was published by the Vietnam Centre, an independent, non-government and non-profit organization which aims to promote Vietnamese culture to the world. The book contained historical facts about ancient Vietnamese fashion, illustrations and photos. The book Dệt Nên Triều Đại only covers the early years of the Later Lê era's clothing traditions from 1437 to 1471 AD after the Ming dynasty's forces were defeated by Emperor Lê Lợi.

In 2008, there was a festival in Huế, where the Nam Giao ceremony was performed again after being revived again for the first time in 2004. Traditional clothing was worn during the ceremony and highlighted the clothing worn during the Nguyễn dynasty (however, some of the clothing of the Nguyễn dynasty in this event are still inaccurate).

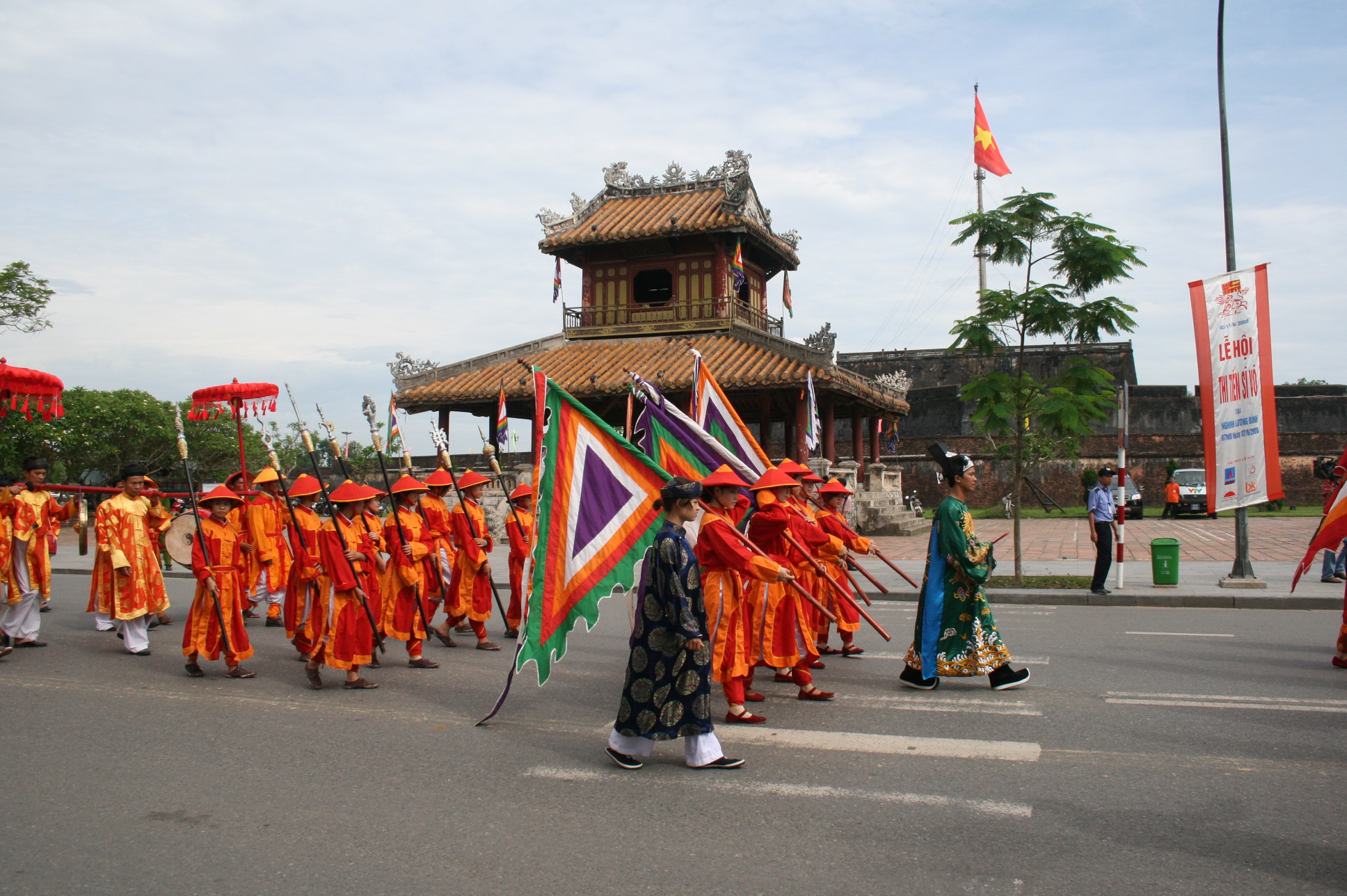
A parade in front of the Huế citadel.

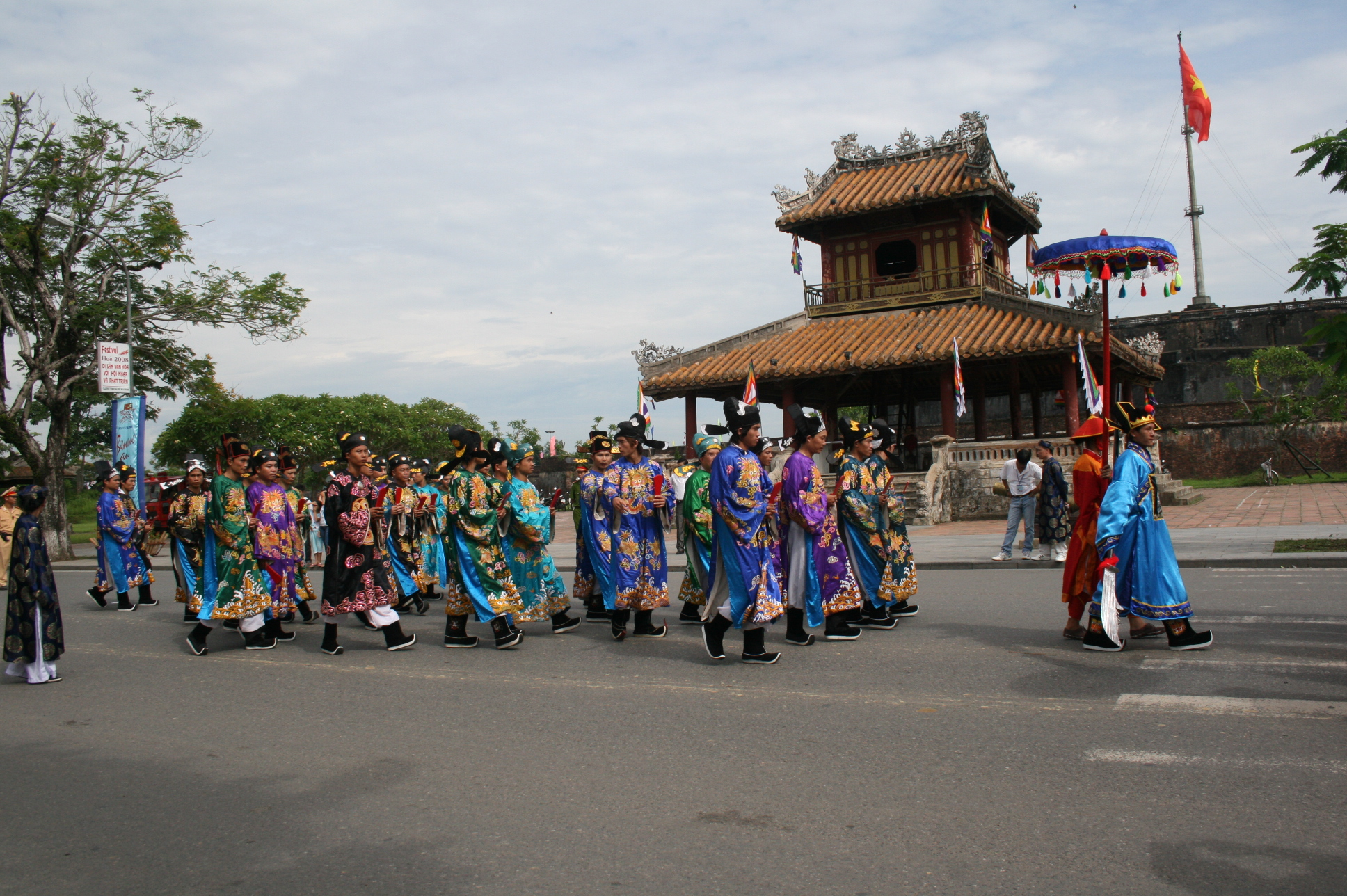
People in formal mandarin official uniforms walking in a parade.

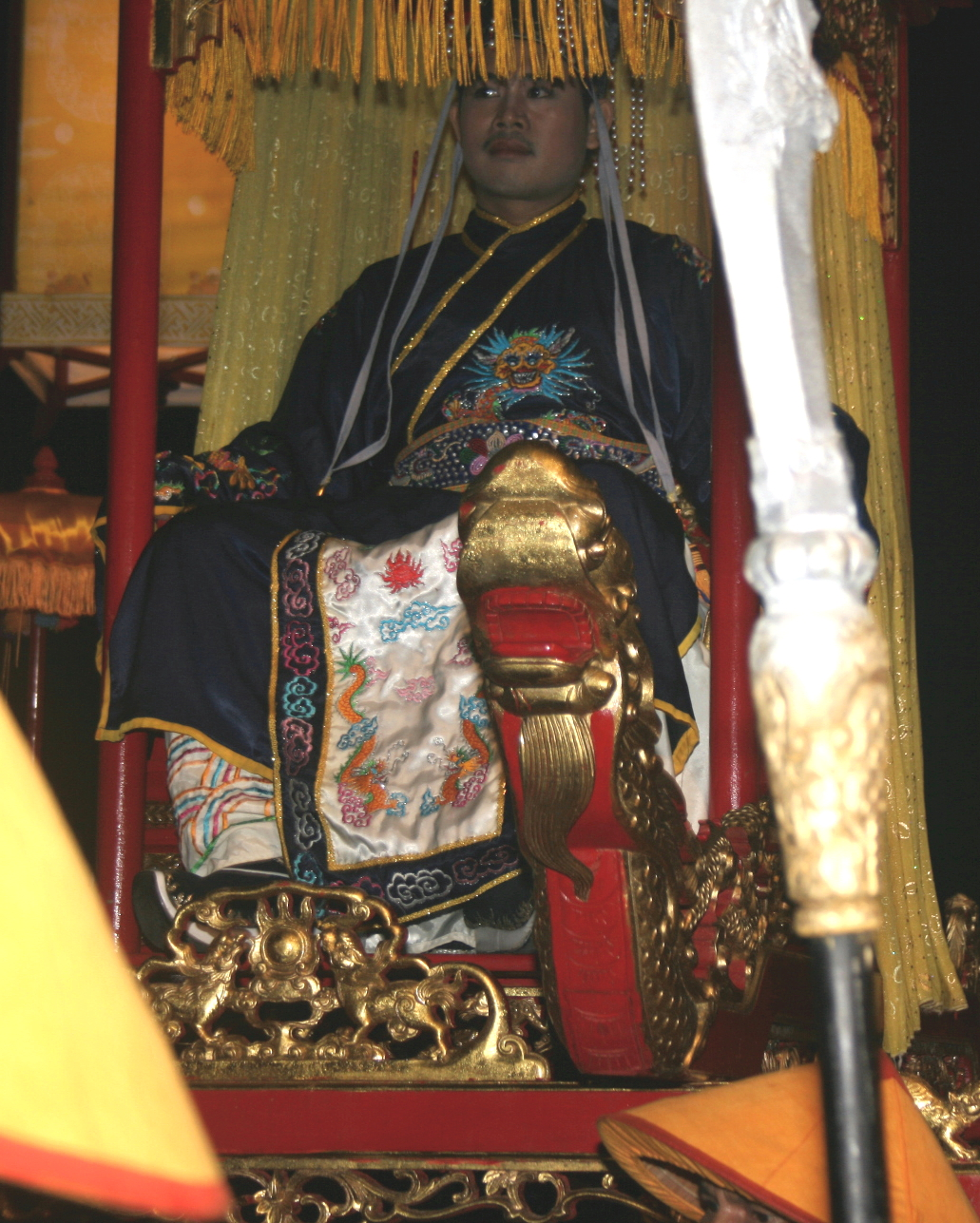
A man playing as the role of the emperor, wearing traditional clothing for the ritual.

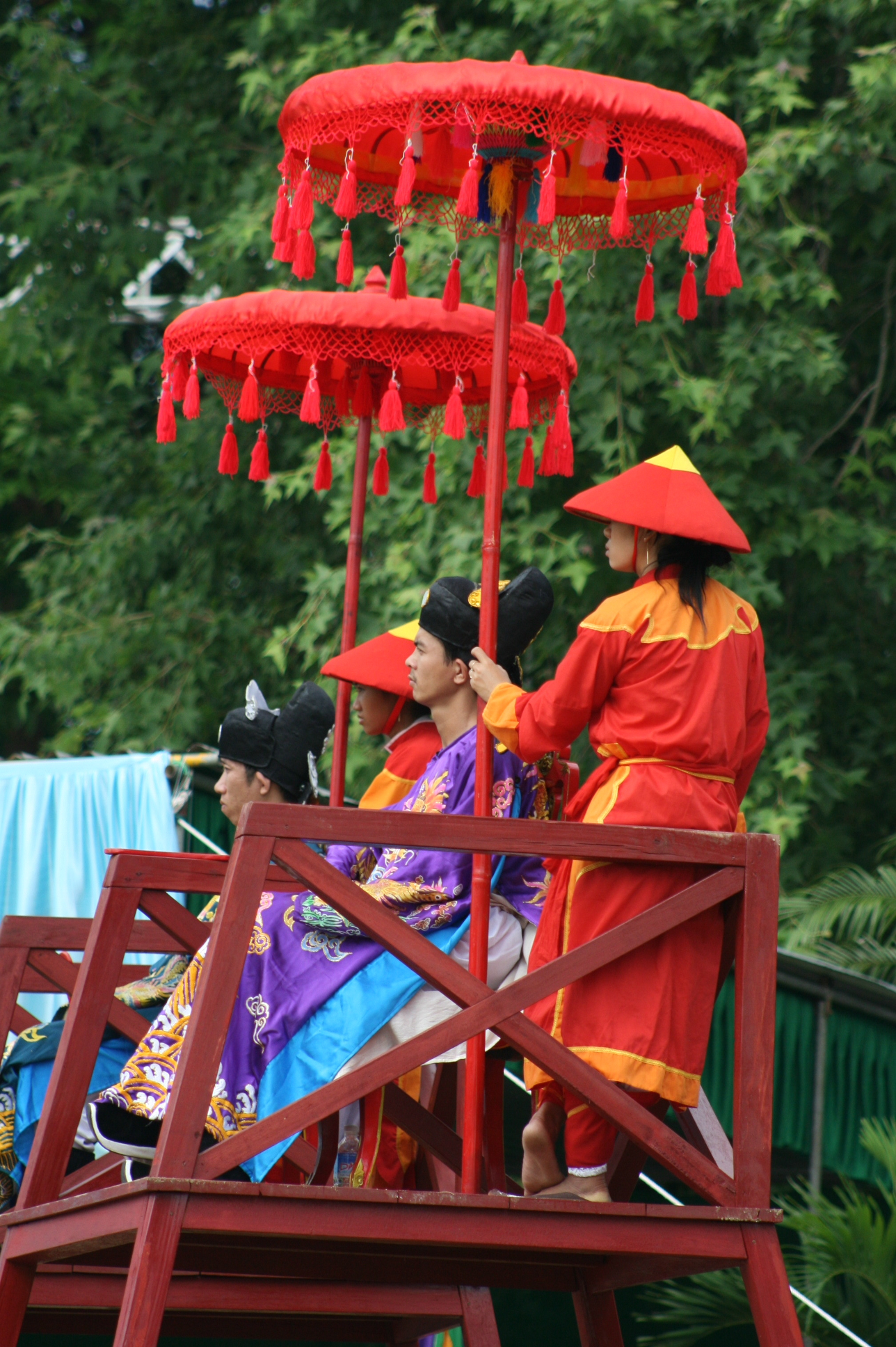
Mandarins sitting uptop chairs while royal guards hold umbrellas.

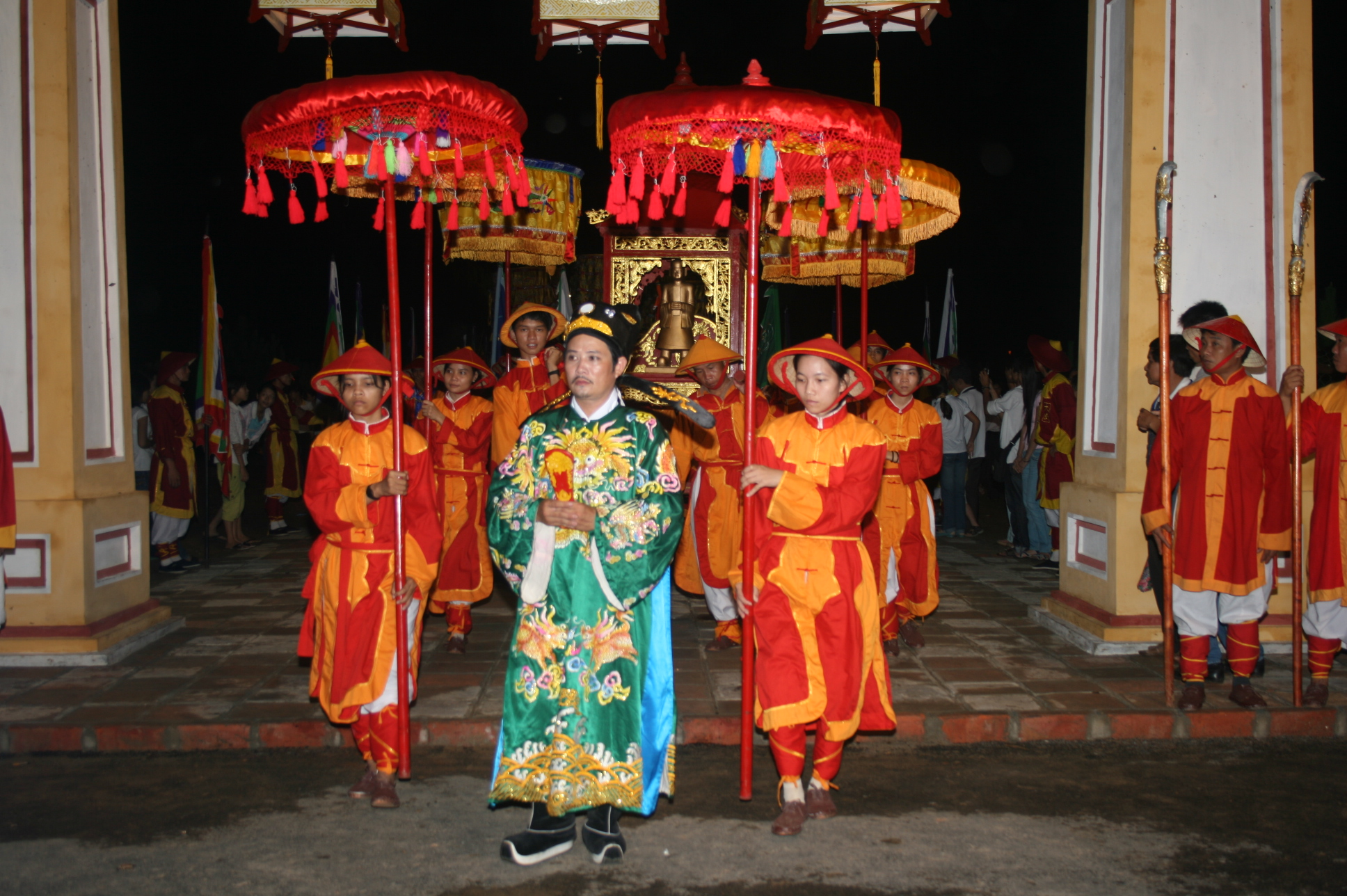
The procession of the emperor going towards the ritual altar.

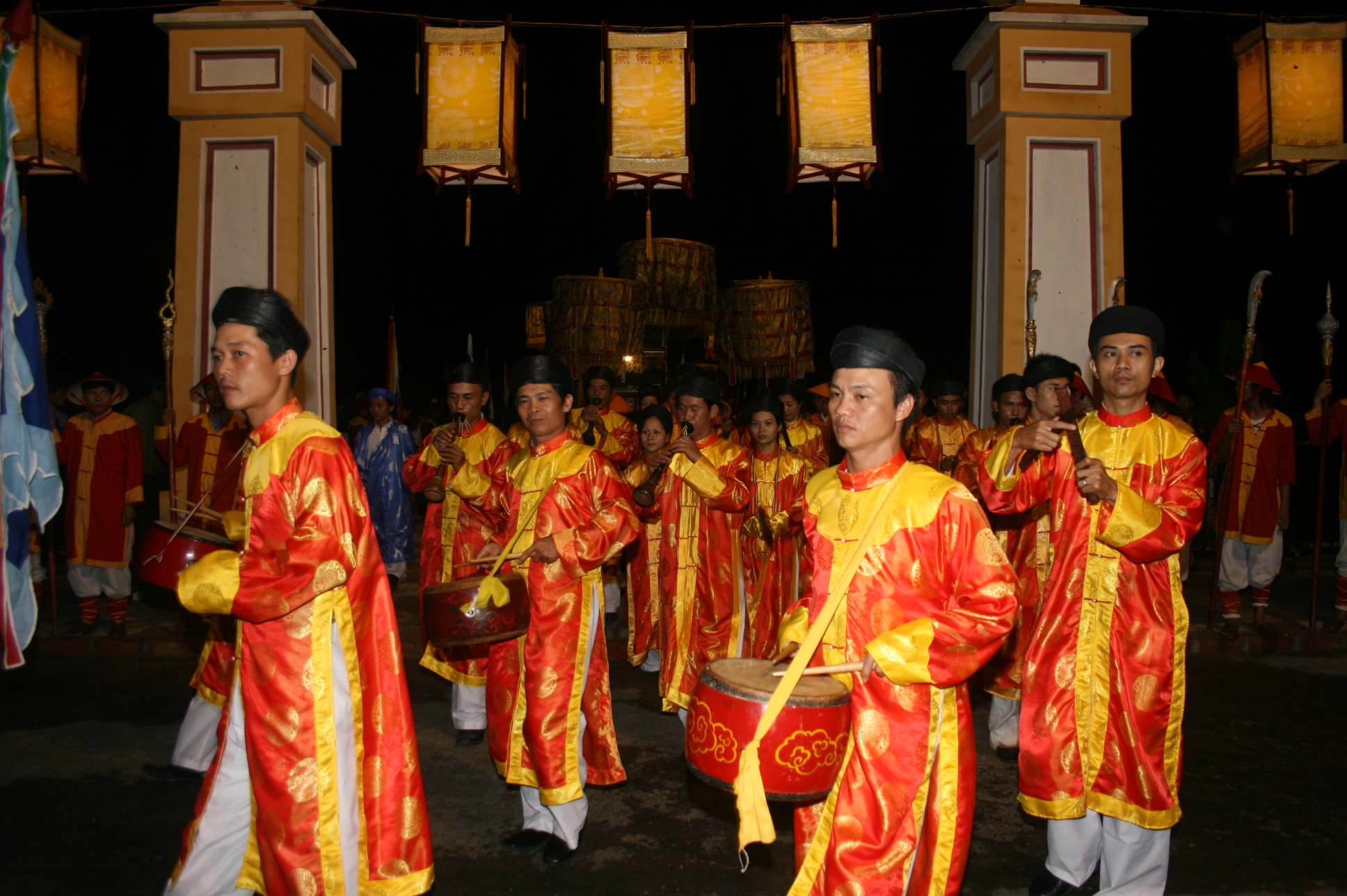
Musicians of the royal court playing traditional court music (nhã nhạc).

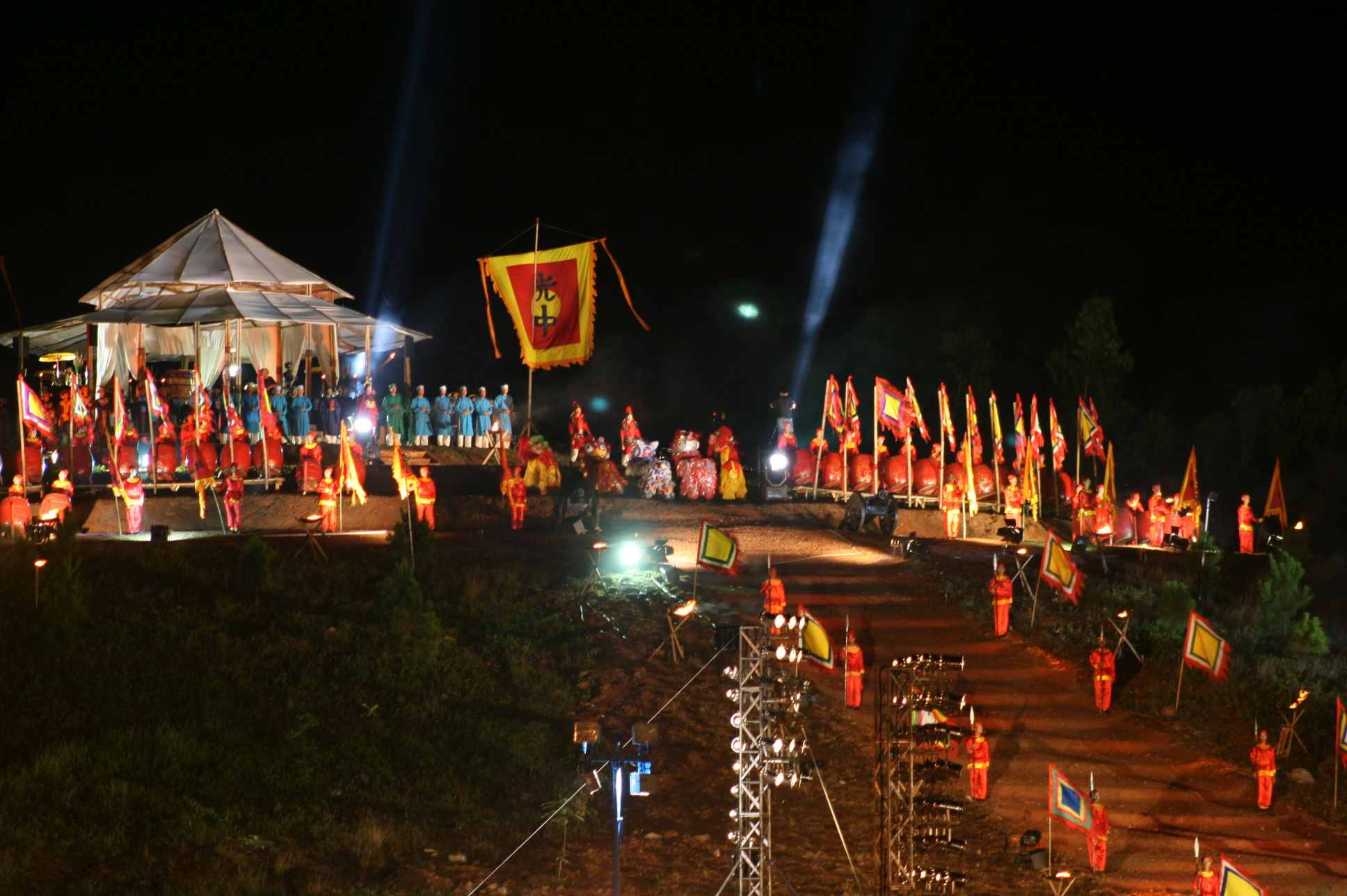
Reenactment of the moment that Emperor Quang Trung ascended the throne atop Bân mountain (Núi Bân).

== Types of clothing ==
=== Áo dài ===
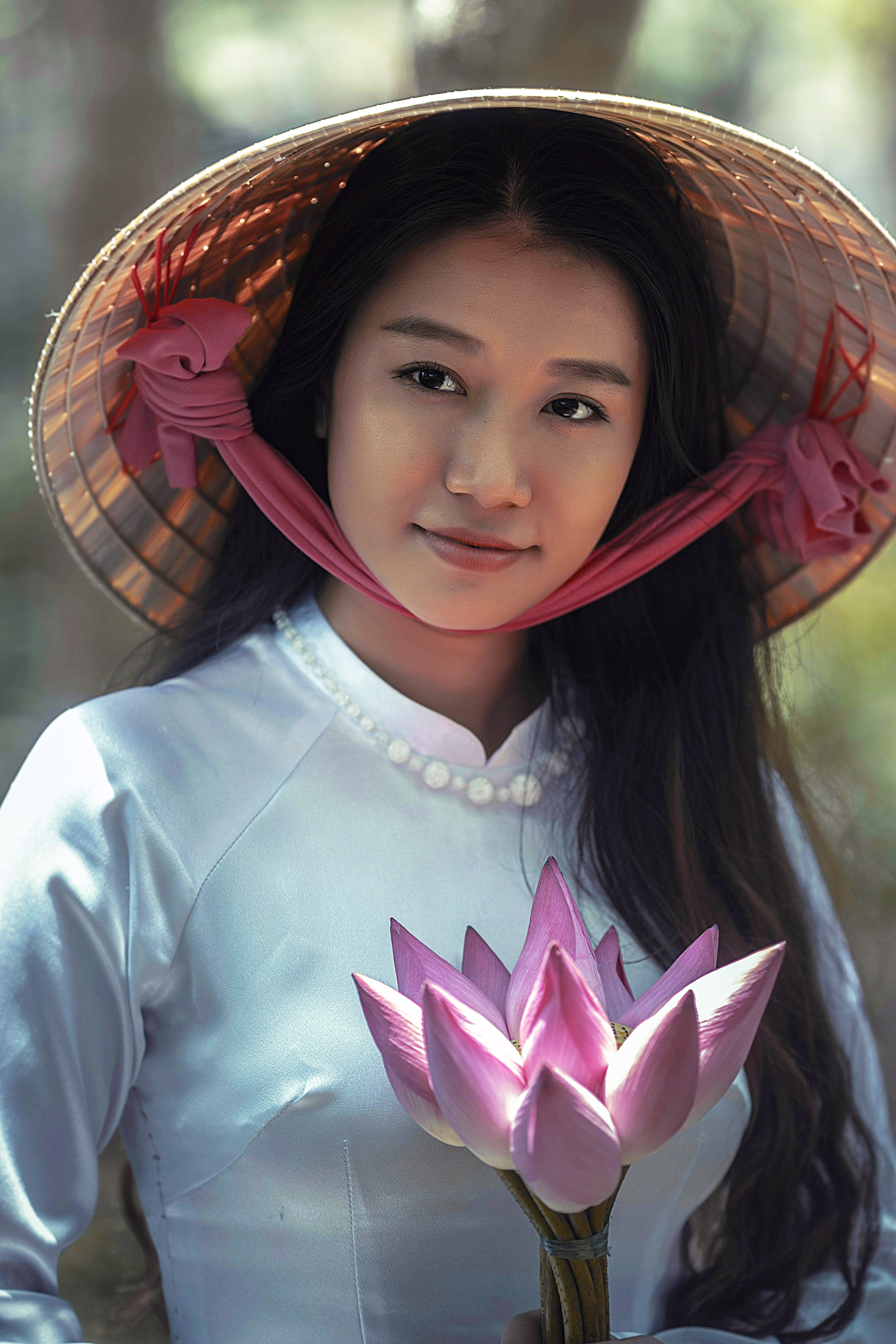
A woman in Cần Thơ wearing an áo dài and a nón lá.

Áo dài (lit. "long coat") is one of the national Vietnamese garments and is the most popular one. It typically consists of a long, split tunic worn over silk trousers. The Áo Dài has many variations. While most commonly associated with female high school students (white áo dài) and teachers, the dress is also worn by females and males alike during weddings and festivals, especially Tết. Its predecessor, áo ngũ thân (lit. " five-flap coat") is still worn primarily by men during traditional rituals and ceremonies. Áo dài is sometimes paired with nón lá, or more traditionally khăn vấn.

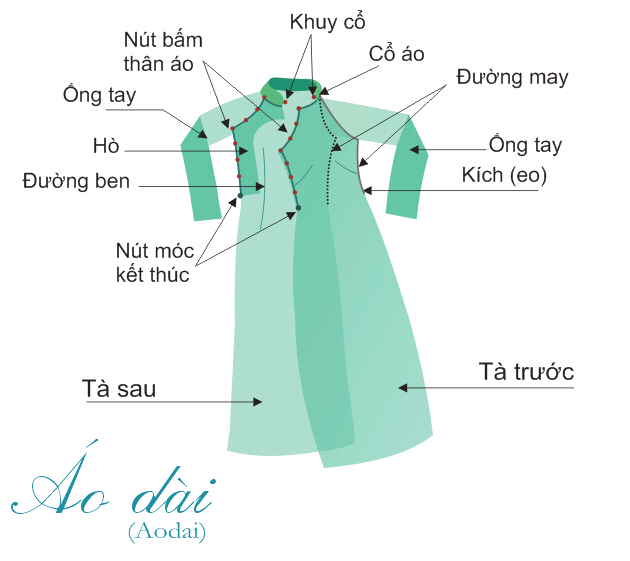
Diagram showing the parts of an áo dài

==== Parts of the outfit ====
- Tà sau: back flap
- Nút bấm thân áo: hooks used as fasteners and holes
- Ống tay: sleeve
- Đường bên: inside seam
- Nút móc kết thúc: main hook and hole
- Tà trước: front flap
- Khuy cổ: collar button
- Cổ áo: collar
- Đường may: seam
- Kích (eo): waist

=== Khăn vấn ===
Khăn vấn or khăn đóng (lit. "coiled cloth") is a style of turban traditionally paired with áo dài, áo ngũ thân, and áo tứ thân. It was traditionally worn hand-wrapped, although pre-wrapped khăn vấn has become the default due to convenience, even during formal events. Khăn vấn was formalized in Đàng Trong during the 18th century and might have been influenced in its development by the Cham tradition of wearing wrapped turbans.

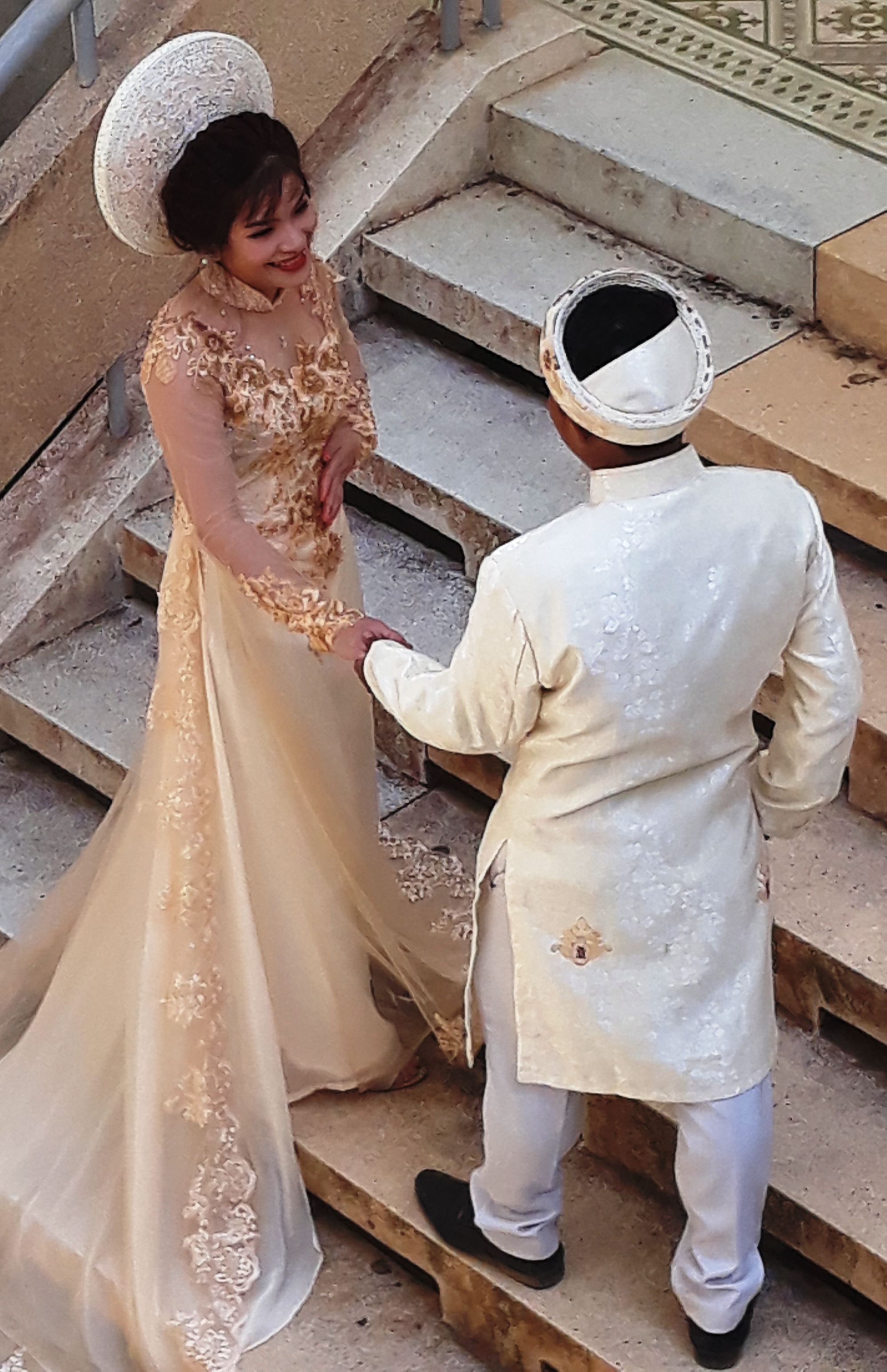
A bride and a groom wearing khăn vấn on their wedding.

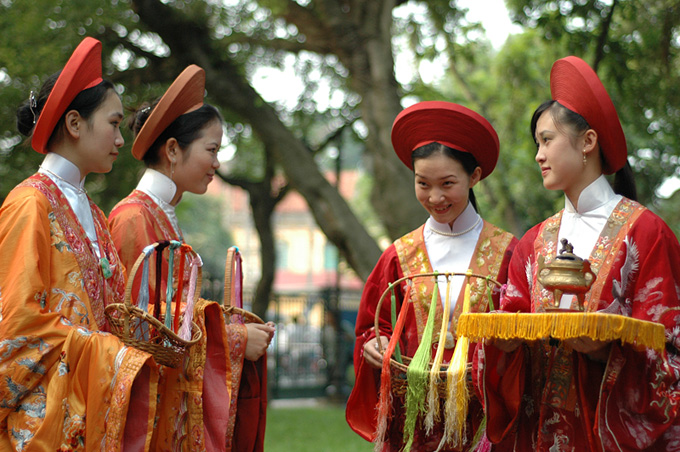
Vietnamese women wear a version of áo Nhật bình with khăn vấn.

=== Áo tứ thân ===
Áo tứ thân is a traditional Vietnamese dress for women, especially popular in the Northern region. It is made from four pieces of cloth, two front panels and two back panels. According to researchers, Áo tứ thân may have originated from the Lý dynasty. Initially, Áo tứ thân was worn by both men and women, but gradually became the traditional dress of women. Today, Áo tứ thân is not as widely used as before. However, Áo tứ thân is still loved by many people and worn on traditional festivals such as chầu văn festivals, village festivals, and Mid-Autumn festival

== Gallery ==
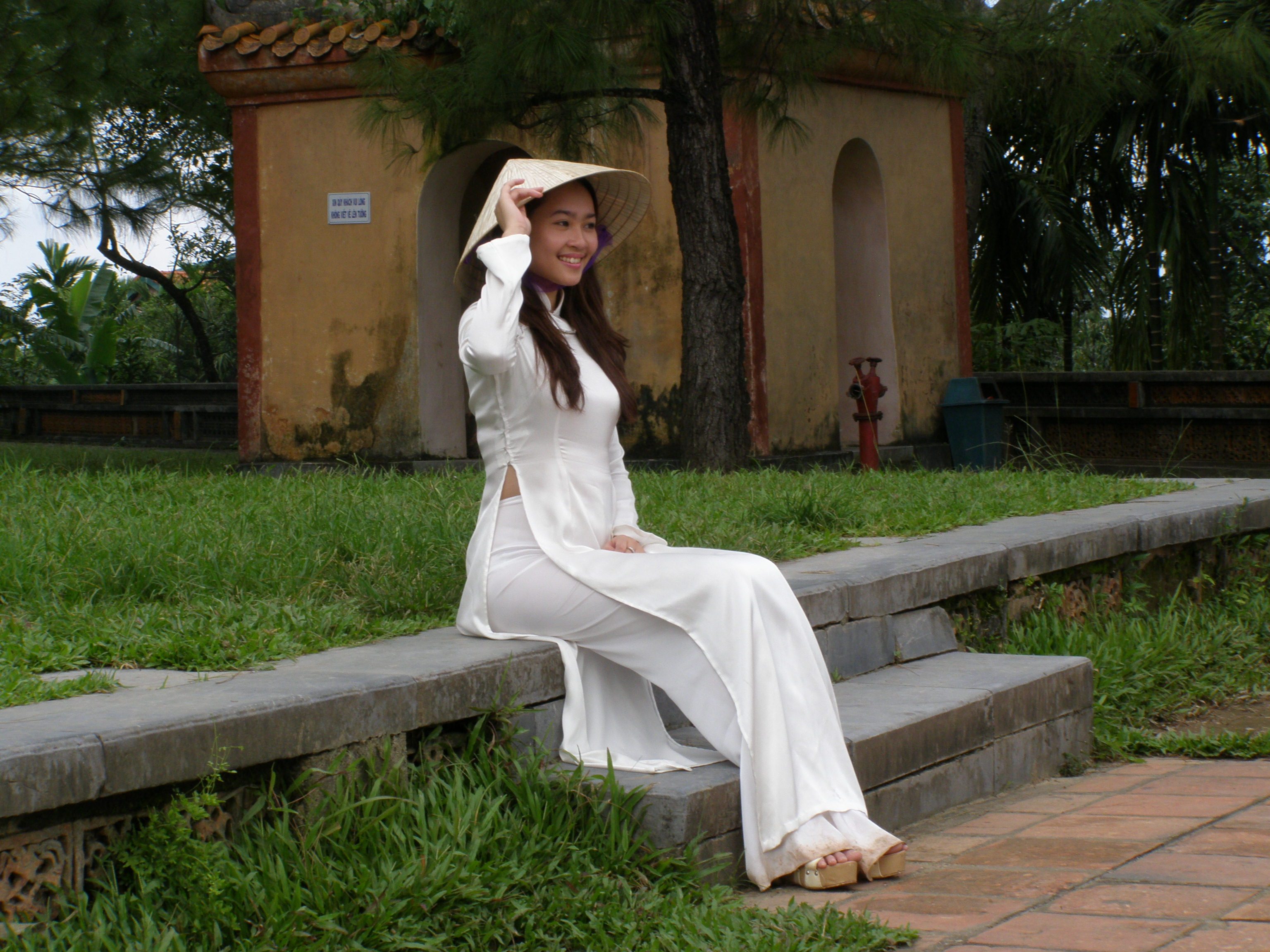
Woman wearing áo dài in Huế.

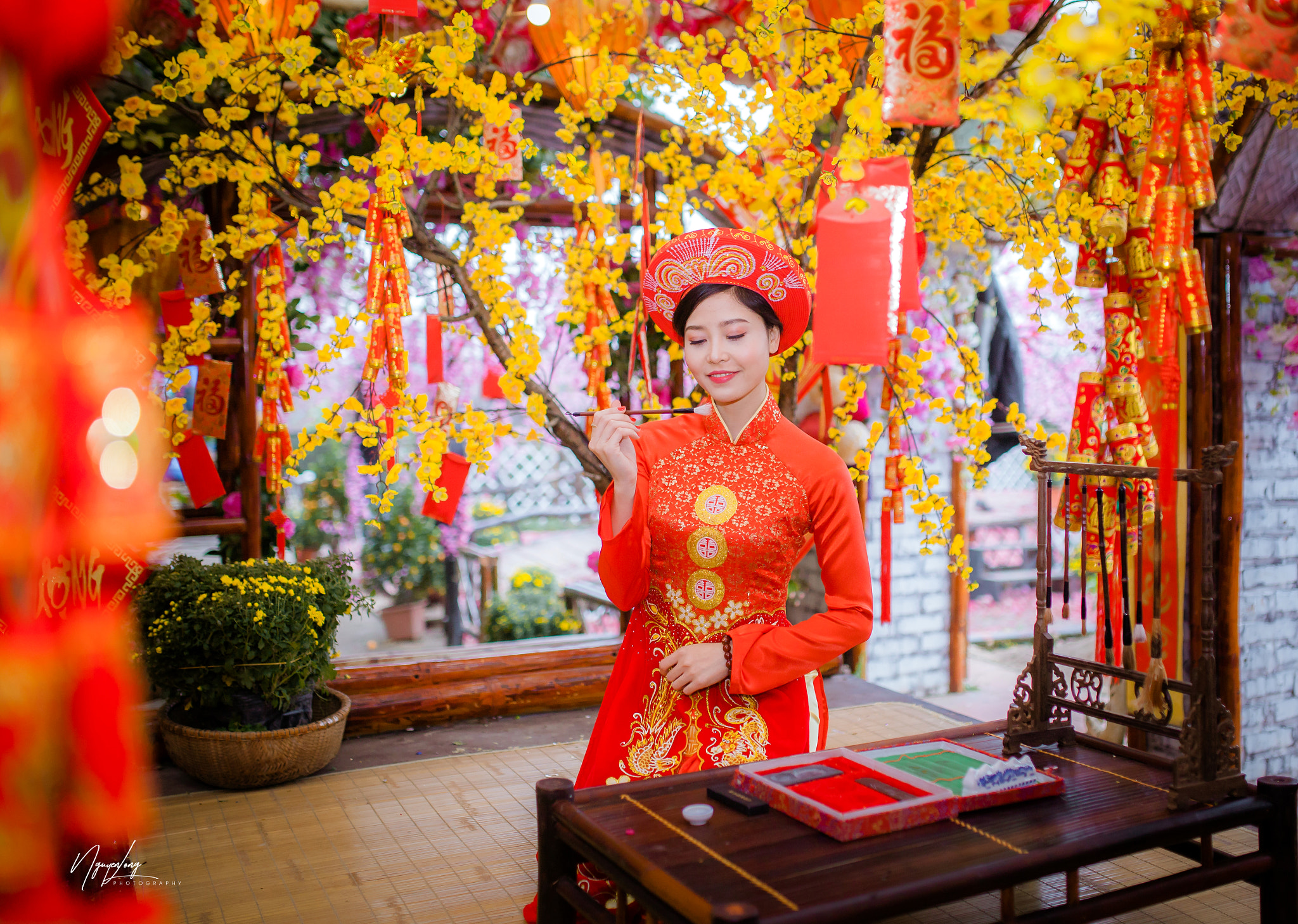
Woman wearing modernized áo dài and khăn vành dây during Tết.

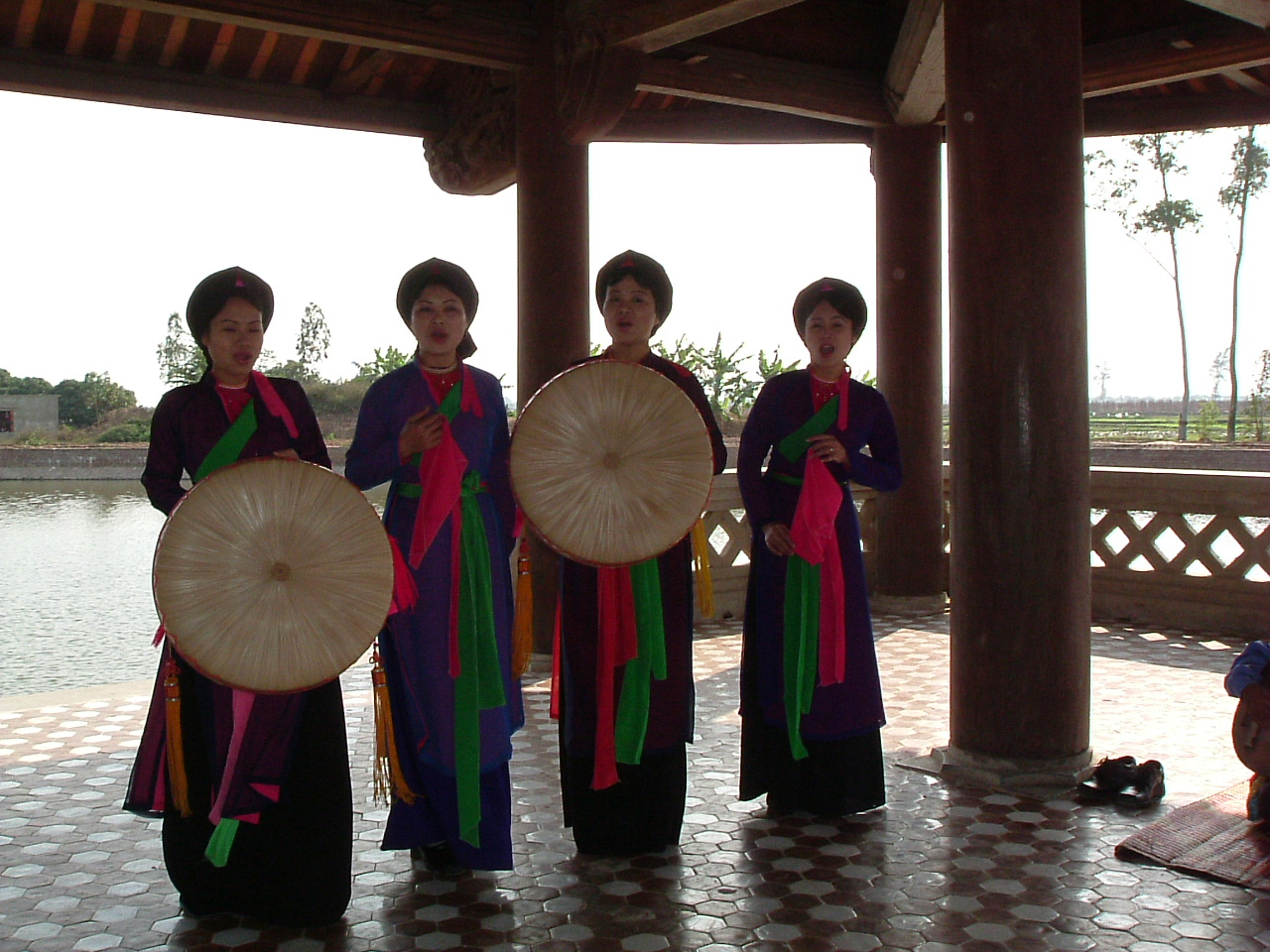
Quan họ ensemble in unbuttoned áo ngũ thân and khăn mỏ quạ.

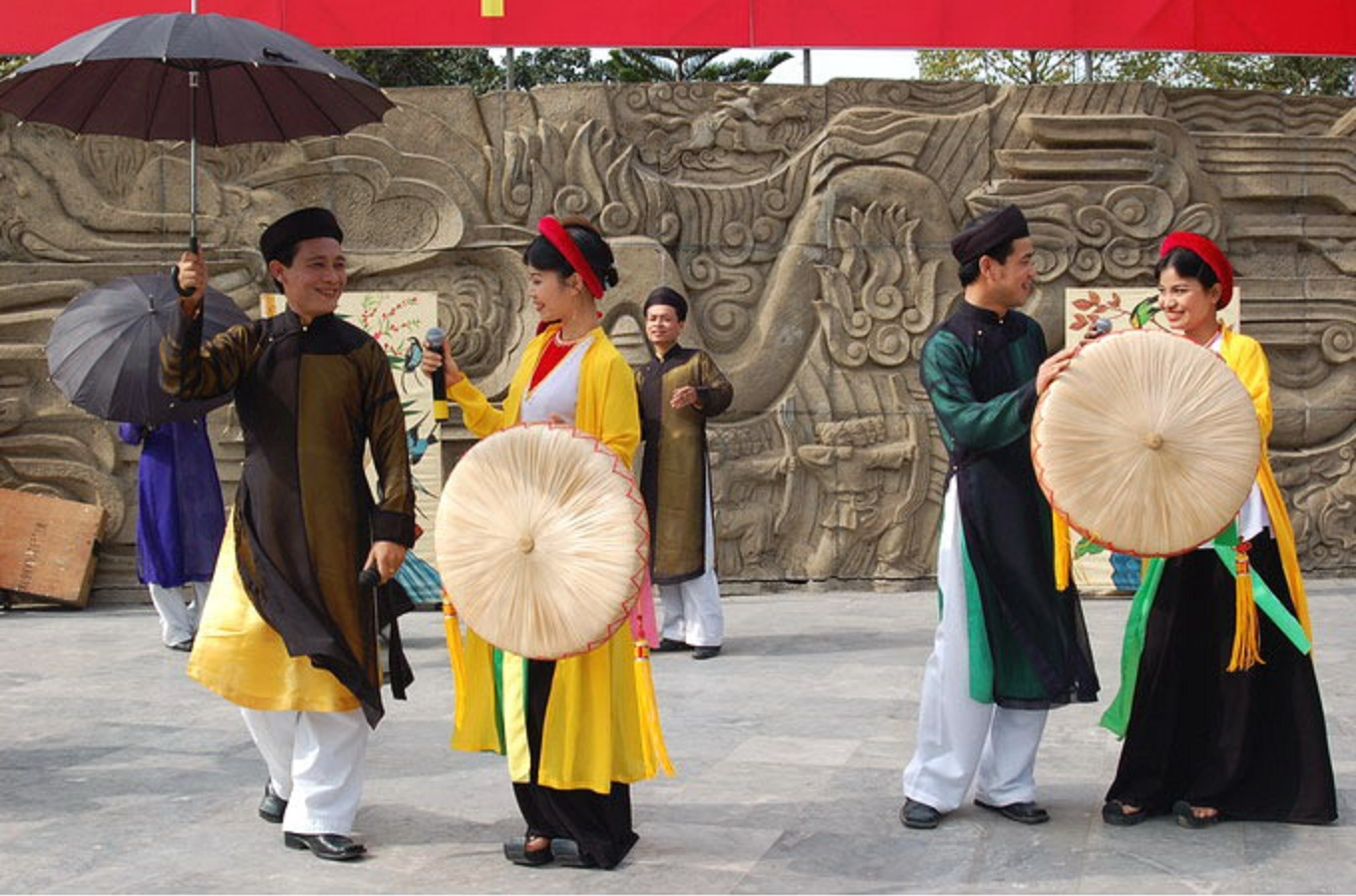
Quan họ ensemble in áo ngũ thân and áo tứ thân.

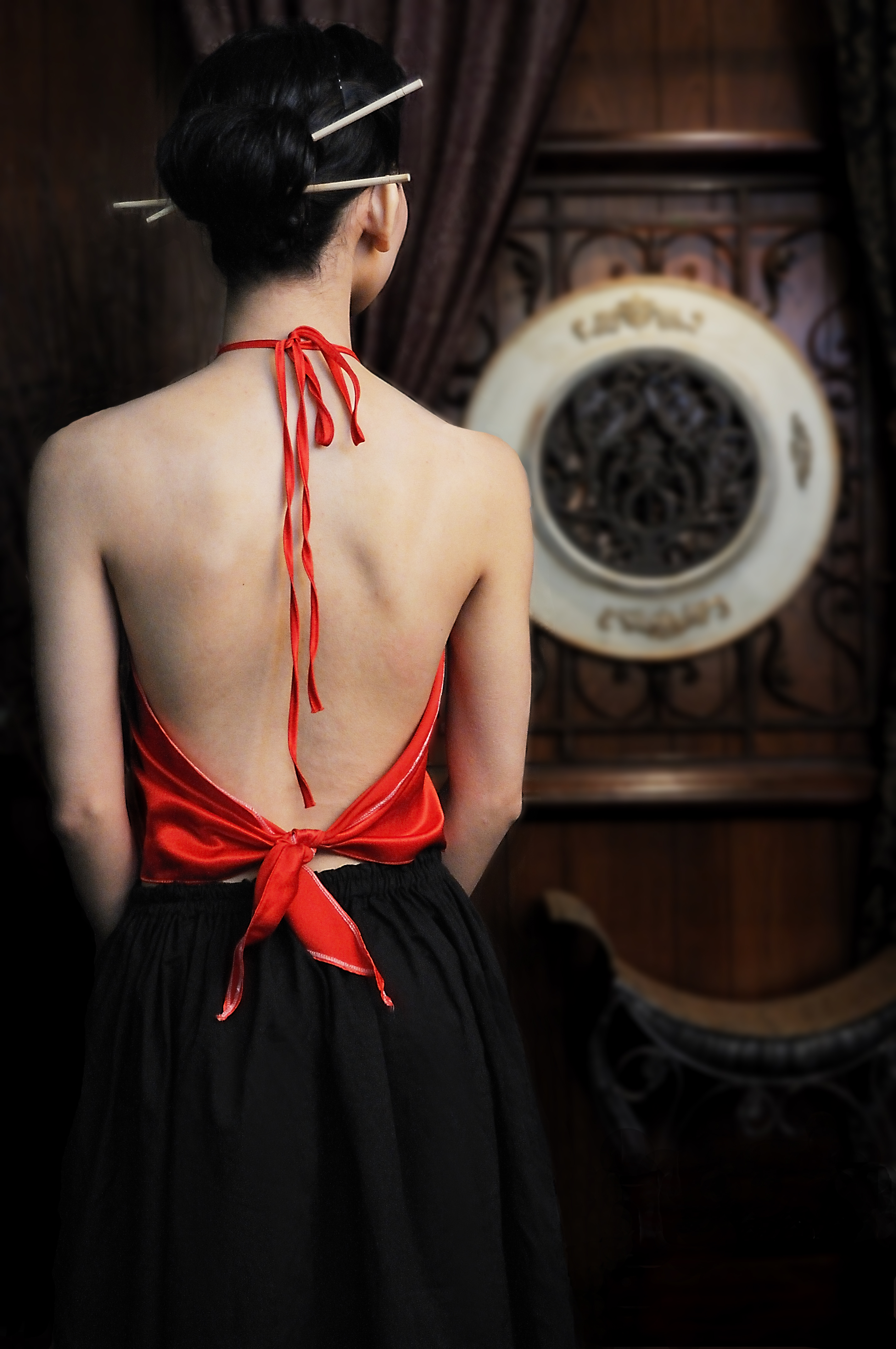
Woman wearing yếm.

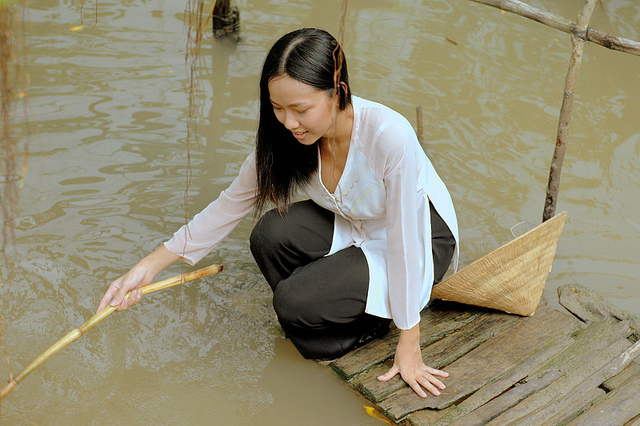
Southwestern Vietnamese woman in áo bà ba.

== Examples of garments ==
- Áo giao lĩnh - is a type of cross-collared robe that was commonly used throughout all dynasties of Vietnam, but by the Nguyễn dynasty (1802-1945), áo giao lĩnh was only used in rituals. Also known as áo tràng vạt.
- Áo viên lĩnh - Is a type of round neck shirt popular throughout the dynasties of Vietnam, under the Nguyễn dynasty they were still used as vestments for mandarins, emperors, empress, and royal aristocrats.
- Áo tứ điên - is a type of áo viên lĩnh, this costume was popular before the Nguyễn dynasty, especially popular in the Lý and Trần dynasties.
- Áo đối khâm - a type of costume usually worn outside, popular in the Lý - Trần dynasties.
- Áo tứ thân - a four-piece woman's dress widely popular in the North of Vietnam.
- Áo ngũ thân - a dress with five parts, this costume is divided into two types: áo ngũ thân tay chẽn (áo chẽn) and áo ngũ thân tay thụng (áo tấc). In addition, this dress is also the predecessor of áo dài.
- Khăn mỏ quạ - crow beak scarf is a traditional headscarf of ancient Vietnamese women.
- Áo yếm - woman's undergarment.
- Áo gấm – formal brocade tunic for government receptions, or áo the for the man in weddings.
- Mũ chữ Đinh - It is a type of hat with the shape of the character Đinh (丁), it was worn by officers and middle-class men during the Lê dynasty.
- Mũ Phốc Đầu - formal headwear for the royal court, traditionally mandarin officials wore it. It is derived from the Chinese Futou.
- Nón lá and nón ba tầm (nón quai thao) - traditional hats worn in the south and north of Vietnam.
- Khăn vấn – a type of turban worn by the Vietnamese people from Nguyễn dynasty to the present day.
- Áo tràng Phật tử – typically shortened to "áo tràng" it is a robe worn by Upāsaka and Upāsikā in Vietnamese Buddhist temples. (Note: Typically light blue but can be found in brown and is similar to the ones worn by Vietnamese Buddhist monastics in regards to the trademark collar similar to the Áo Giao lĩnh but without the sleeves with hidden pockets. While there are matching pants they are not a required part of the outfit for the laity. They are also known as áo giao lĩnh.)
- Áo dài – the typical Vietnamese formal dress
- Áo bà ba – two-piece ensemble for men and women
- Kiềng – a traditional necklace typically made out of gold, worn on special occasions such as weddings, festivals, or other important ceremonies.

== See also ==
- Culture of Vietnam
- History of Vietnam
