= Nguyễn Thị Minh Khai High School =

School in Ho Chi Minh City, Vietnam

Coordinates: 10°46′44″N 106°41′13″E

- Trường THPT Nguyễn Thị Minh Khai
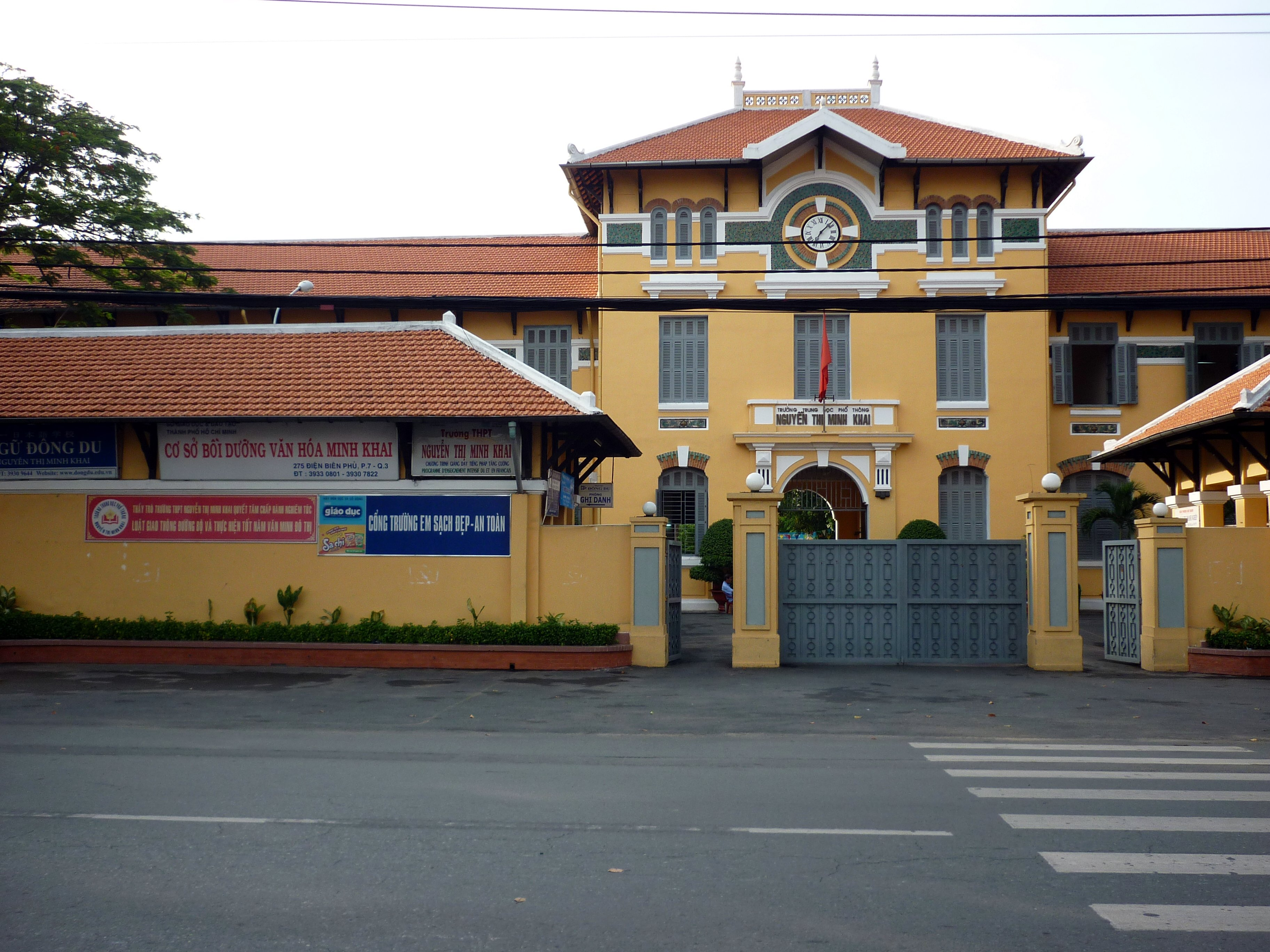

Location
- 275 Điện Biên Phủ street, Xuân Hoà ward, Ho Chi Minh City, Vietnam

Information
- Former name: Gia Long All-girls High School
- Type: Public high school
- Established: c. 1913
- Principal: Nguyễn Thị Hồng Chương

Nguyễn Thị Minh Khai High school (Vietnamese: Trường Trung học Phổ thông Nguyễn Thị Minh Khai) formerly known as Gia Long All-girls High School (Vietnamese: Trường Nữ Trung học Gia Long) or more informally referred to as Miki, is a public high school in Ho Chi Minh City, Vietnam. Established in 1913, it is one of the oldest high schools in the country. The school is named after Nguyễn Thị Minh Khai, a prominent communist revolutionary that led the national liberation movement in Saigon in the late 1930s.

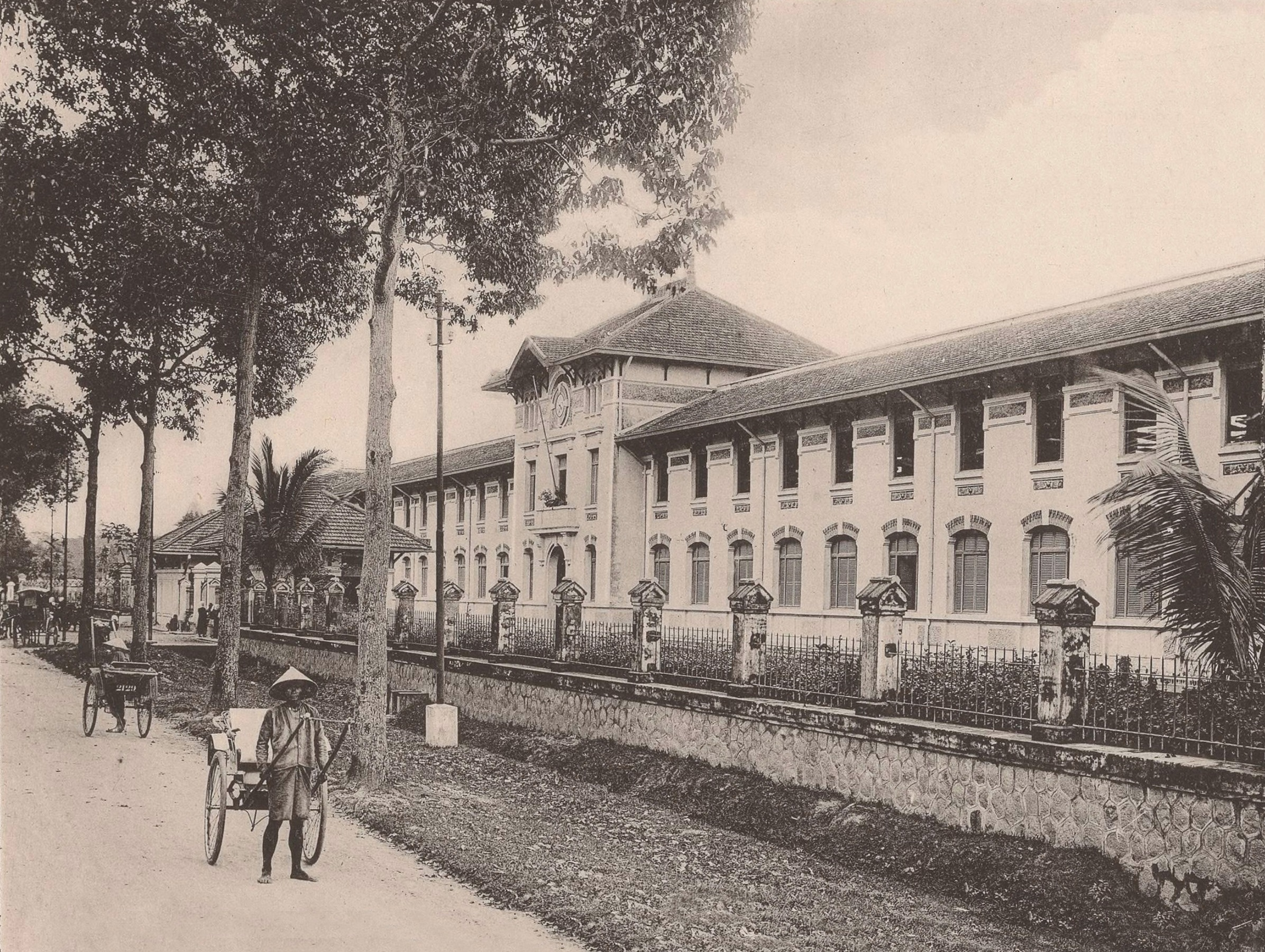
The front of Áo Tím all-girls high school 1922

== History ==
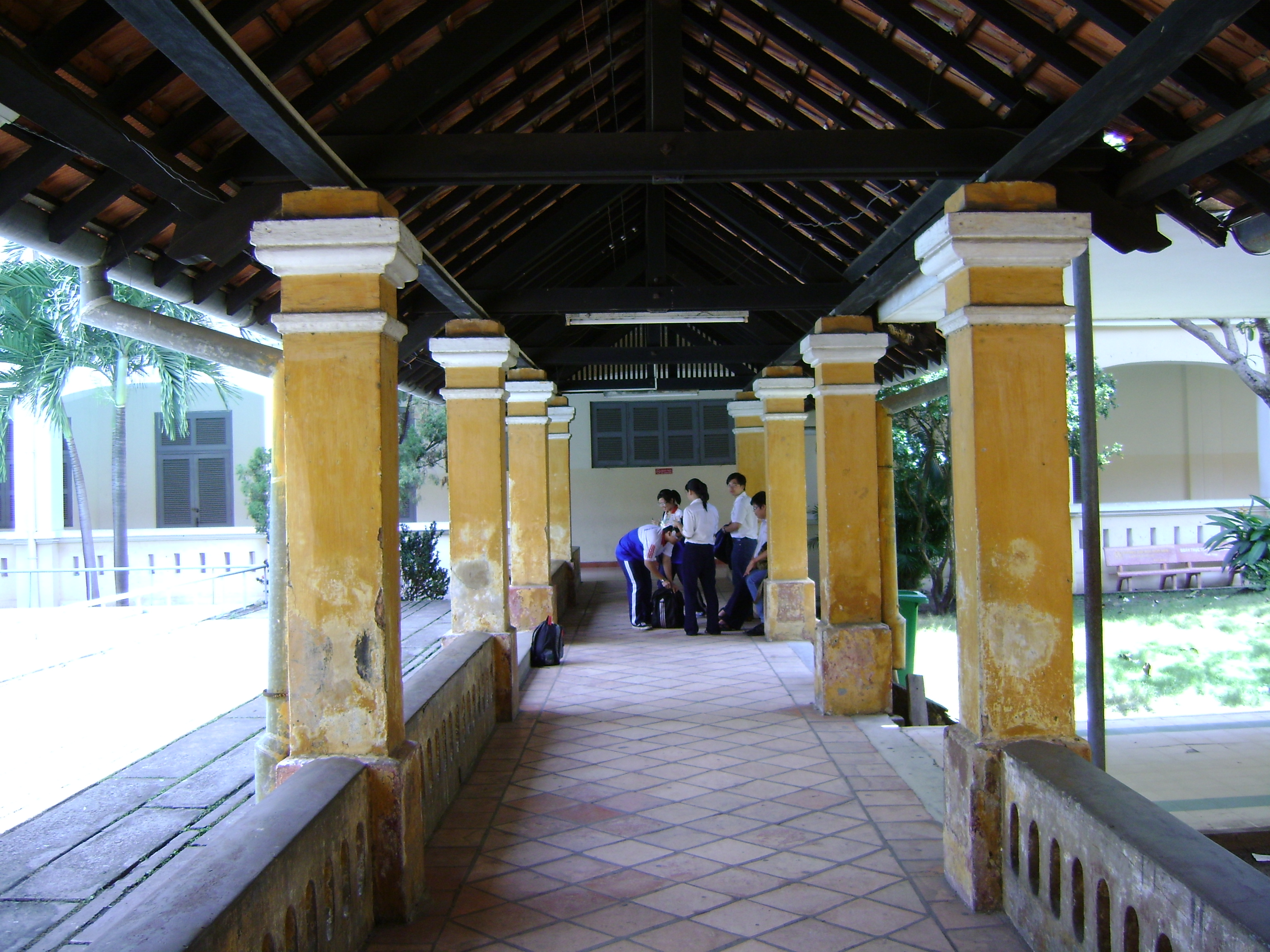
Path to the library and new classrooms

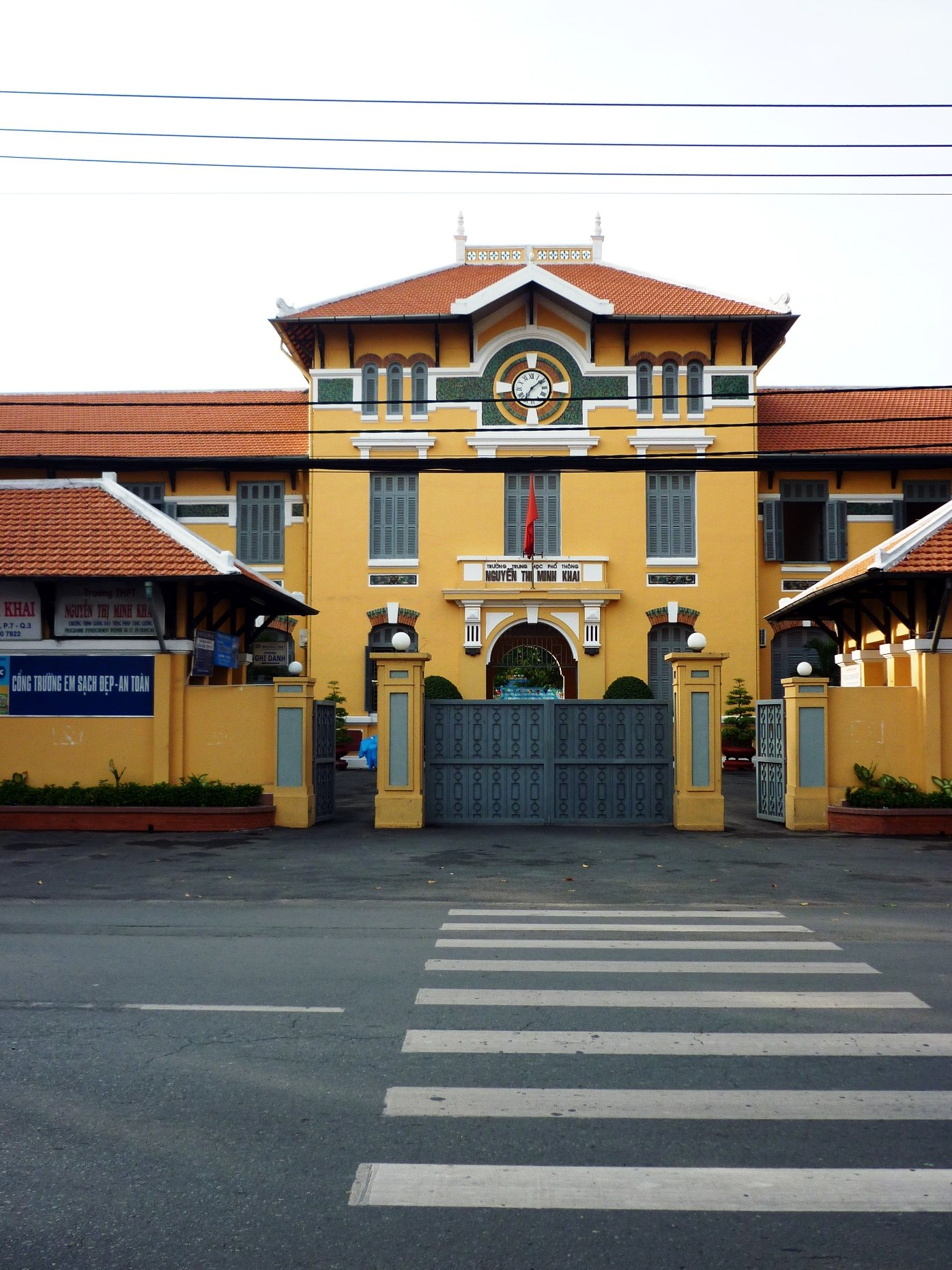
Main gate

=== French Indochina ===
In the early 20th century, traditional Confucian education in Vietnam attached little importance to educating women. In 1908, some Vietnamese intellectuals proposed that the French colonial authority should construct a multi-level school specifically for girls. The proposal was approved but owing to lack of funds, it wasn't until 1913 that the school began construction on a large site in Legrand de la Liraye Street, Saigon (now is Điện Biên Phủ street, Ho Chi Minh City).

In 1915, the construction of the school was completed and the first pupils were admitted. The Governor-General of French Indochina at that time was Ernest Roume and he, together with Governor Courbeil, cut the inauguration tape and declared the beginning of a new school year. 42 schoolgirls were enrolled in the first year. Uniforms at that time were violet áo dài, symbolising the purity of Vietnamese women. For this reason, the school had also been called Áo Tím (Violet Dress) all-girls school. All pupils lived in Sài Gòn and nearby areas and only later were hostels provided for schoolgirls from further afield. The school was organised on several levels: Infants (Enfantin), Superior (Supérieur), Conference of Primary Education (CEP). Students had to pass the exam for the Certificate of Fundamental Education after graduating from senior classes. In 1918, because of the increase in student numbers, a new building parallel to the previous one was constructed. The new building was multifunctional with the lower floor being used as a hostel for students. At the rear was the infirmary, the wash-room and the kitchen. That was also the place where domestic science and embroidery were taught.

In September 1922, Governor-general Albert Sarraut initiated the first year classes. A marble stone that was carved "COLLÈGE DES JEUNES FILLES INDIGÈNES" (College of indigenous girls) was erected in front of the school gate, though the school continued to be known primarily as "Áo Tím all-girls school".

The first headmistress was a French woman named Lagrange. In order to enroll in the school, students had to pass essential education exams and school entrance exams. The French language had been taught since the beginning, being the official language used for teaching in High-school First Grade classes. Schoolgirls were only allowed to communicate in French with Vietnamese being taught in two Vietnamese literature hours per week.

Despite the fact that the school was administrated by the French, resentment against French colonialism had been smouldering. In the 1920s, Vietnamese schoolgirls demonstrated and protested twice; first in 1920 when a French teacher asked Vietnamese students to give the top seats to French students and the second in 1924 at Phan Bội Châu's funeral procession.

In the summer of 1940, the Japanese army took over the building complex and later the British army occupied it. The school was moved to the premises of Đồ Chiểu primary school in the Tân Định area. Also in the 1940s, the school changed name, becoming Collège Gia Long then Lycée Gia Long.

Before the August Revolution in 1945, many schoolgirls directly participated in activities which were to encourage the Việt Minh such as Quốc ngữ (National Language) propagation, the north starvation assistance and passive defense.

In 1947, after being captured by the British, the damage sustained by conflict to the facilities were so grave that financial assistance was needed in order to repair the buildings. Two years later in 1949, the school was once again expanded and a two-storey building was constructed in Bà Huyện Thanh Quan Street in order to meet the increasing student numbers. In the same year, Trương Vĩnh Ký school students organised a strike to commemorate the 1940 Cochinchina uprising against the French, which led to the school year being suspended.

=== State of Vietnam and Republic of Vietnam ===
In 1950, after steadfast struggle by students from various schools all over Saigon (among whom many were martyred, such as Trần Văn Ơn), the school was re-opened. This also marked a significant turning point: for the first time a Vietnamese had been chosen as principal, headmistress Nguyễn Thị Châu.

Two years later, Vietnamese curriculum replaced French education and schoolgirls had to study in both English and French. The entrance exams were very challenging, with students coming from all over the South Vietnam including Sài Gòn, Chợ Lớn, Gia Định, Biên Hòa and Tân An. In a high school entrance exam in 1971, there were 8000 participants who registered and took the test but only 819 of them passed.

In 1953, the uniforms were changed from violet Áo dài to white Áo dài with an emblem of a yellow apricot blossom stitched to the dresses. At the same time, the school was renamed Gia Long All-girls High School.

Throughout the following decade, the school continued to develop and grow. In 1964, it ceased to be a boarding-school and the residential dorms were turned into classrooms. The following year, a new library was added. There were about 55 classes from 4th grade to 1st grade studying in the morning, and 45 classes from 7th grade to 5th grade studying in the afternoon with a total of 3,000 students. At that time, many schoolgirls participated fervently in anti-war movements.

=== Present day ===
After the Fall of Saigon, the school was officially renamed Nguyễn Thị Minh Khai Junior-Senior High School. In the 1978–1979 year, the Junior High School was dissolved and the school started to enroll both boys and girls.

In 2003, the school was included in a list of 55 historical buildings in Saigon to be preserved because of their historical and architectural interest. Currently, there is a special village built since 2000, about 20km away from Ho Chi Minh City called Gia Long (the former name of Nguyễn Thị Minh Khai High School). It is a retiral village for generations of former teachers and students of Áo Tím - Gia Long - Minh Khai to gather in their old age.

In 2012, Nguyễn Thị Minh Khai High School was officially designated as a city-level architectural and artistic monument by the Ho Chi Minh City People's Committee under Decision No. 2211/QĐ-UBND, issued on 28 April 2012.

=== List of Principals ===
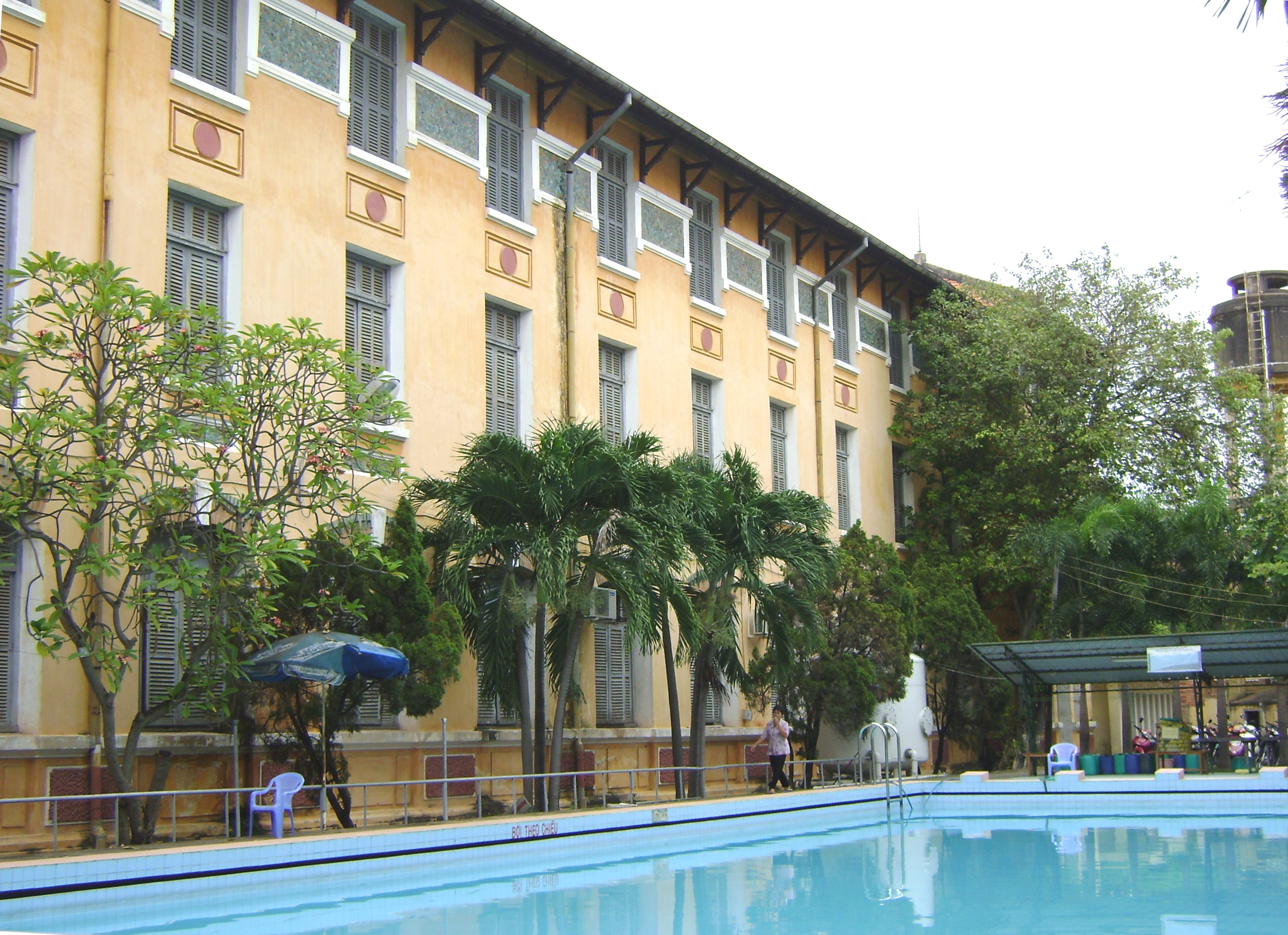
Swimming pool

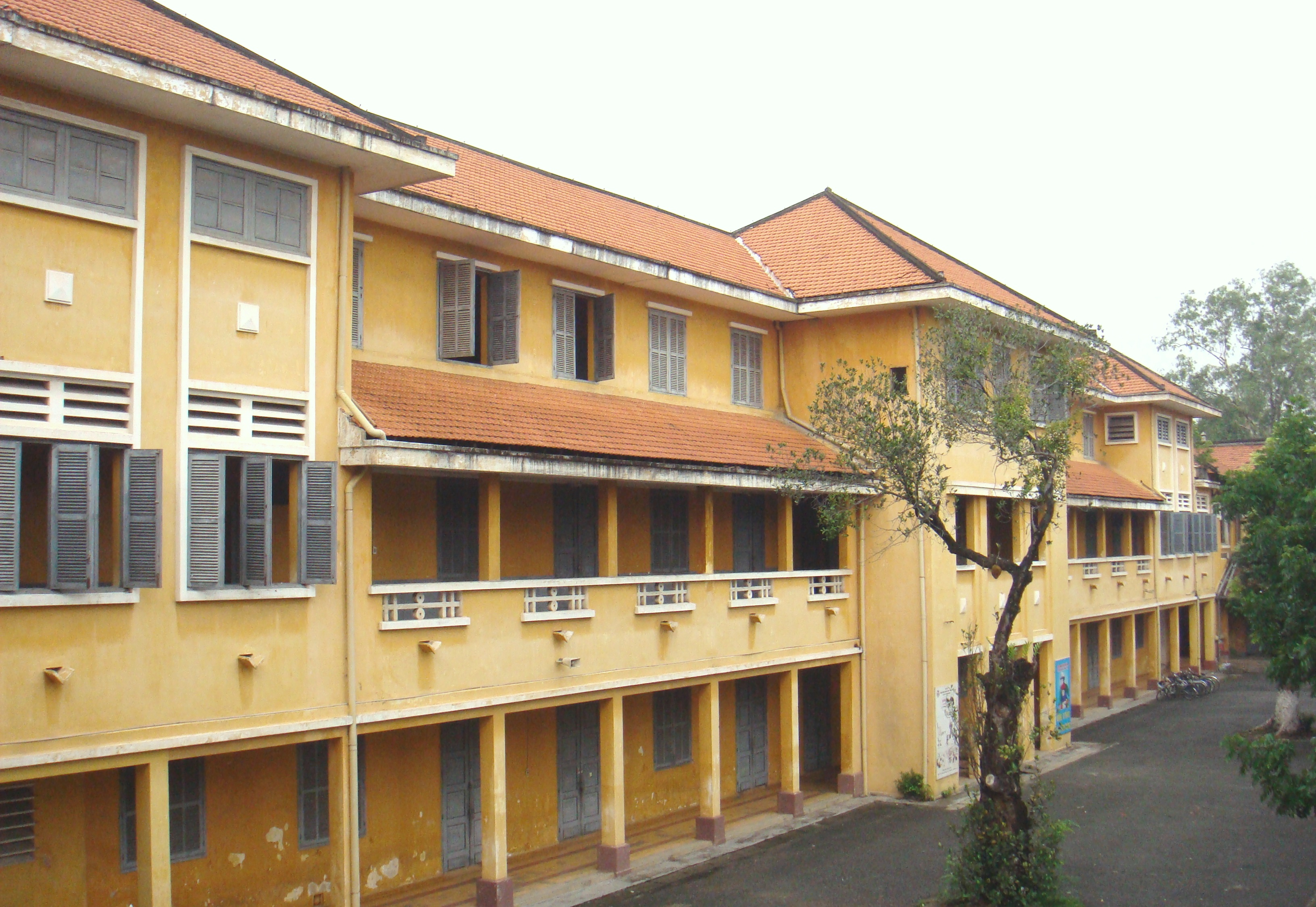
Bà Huyện Thanh Quan row

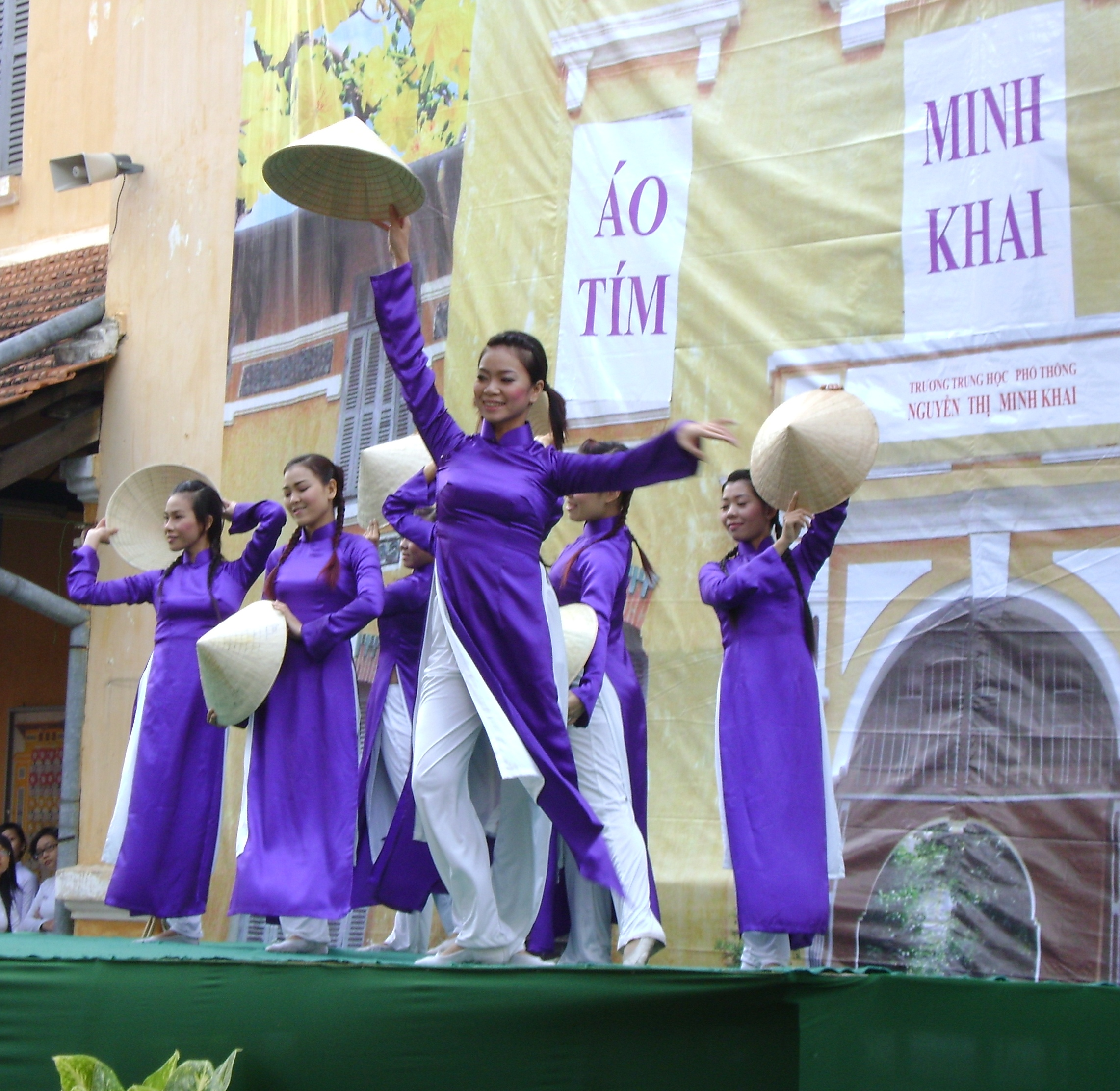
Purple ao-dai dance

School Year	Principal
1914–1920	Mme Lagrange
1920–1922	Mme Lorenzi
1922–1926	Mme Pascalini
1926–1942	Mme Saint-Marty
1942–1945	Mme Fourgeront
1945–1947	Mme Malleret
1950–1952	Mme Nguyễn Thị Châu
1952–1963	Mme Huỳnh Hữu Hội
1963–1964	Mme Nguyễn Thu Ba
1964–1965	Mme Trần Thị Khuê
1965–1969	Mme Trần Thị Tỵ
1969–1975	Mme Phạm Văn Tất
1975–1992	Mrs Trần Thị Tỵ
1992–1997	Mrs Nguyễn Thị Thanh Tâm
1997–2011	Mrs Dương Thị Trúc Bạch
2011–2017	Mrs Phạm Thị Lệ Nhân
2017–Present	Mrs Nguyễn Thị Hồng Chương

== Education and widening relations ==
=== Education ===
The school is organised by a board of directors, comprising headmistress Dương Thị Trúc Bạch and assistant principals Nguyễn Thị Kim Hoa, Trần Văn Khánh. There are groups of teachers in charge of literature, history, geography, civics, foreign languages, maths, physics, chemistry, biology, technology, IT and physical education. Besides this there are other functional offices, the Labour Union and the Youth Union. Students take the entrance exams based on the general regulations of the Ministry of Education and Training in Việt Nam. There are a total of 52 classrooms divided to 3 grades 10-11-12 along with functional rooms such as the library, laboratories, computer rooms, subject rooms, practice rooms, teaching tools rooms, the playground, the judo room and the aerobics room, school owned swimming pool and basketball playground.

=== Innovations ===
Since the previous decade, Nguyễn Thị Minh Khai High School has been a pioneer in teaching methods with a whole series of innovations of which the significant is that optimal ways of teaching and the application of IT are used for designing lectures. Thanks to the development of IT at the school, in 2004, the school was invited by Intel corporation to attend new projects and ways of educating. Thereupon, VVOB and Microsoft corporation continued to propose that we attend other study projects in the next years.

These projects were welcomed by students and teachers. Success was acknowledged by the visit on February 27, 2006, of Mr. Craig Barrett, the ex-chairman of Intel Corporation, the deputy Minister of Education and Training, Nguyễn Tấn Phát, and other superior officials. In 2008, VVOB corporation invited the physics group to record a lesson in order to provide teaching material for the other countries participating in the projects.

=== Exchanges and cooperation ===
The school welcomes 2 delegations of French schools every school year, and sends 2 groups to France for study exchanges. The school also links to famous universities in Thailand, Japan, Taiwan and Singapore. It also cooperates in education, allowing the National University of Singapore and Nanyang Technological University to hold teach-ins to introduce foreign study in Singapore.

=== Linked schools ===
Currently the school is twinned with about 20 French schools and 1 Australian school.

== Culture ==
Literature

Composer Phạm Duy in the song Con đường tình ta đi mentioned his lovers who studied at Trưng Vương and Gia Long schools:

Hỡi người tình Gia Long,
Hỡi người trong cuộc sống
Con đường này xin dâng
Cho người bình thường

Violet dresses, or Gia Long's violet dresses inspired many artists to compose, like the poem Hoa Trắng Thôi Cài Trên Áo Tím by Hà Huy Hà:

Mười năm trước em còn đi học
Áo tím điểm tô đời nữ sinh
Hoa trắng cài duyên trên áo tím
Em là cô gái tuổi băng trinh.

Film

Possessing an impressive and antique appearance, Nguyễn Thị Minh Khai High School has been chosen as the location for several films and series, such as:

- Mười: The Legend of a Portrait (released in 2007)
- Kính vạn hoa (TV series, season 3)

Music

- Ngồi lại bên nhau
