= PTTC =

PTTC may refer to:

- PTTC (Siem Reap, Cambodia), the Provincial Teacher Training College
- Philippine Trade Training Center, an agency of the Philippine Government
- Public Transport Ticketing Corporation, an Australian government agency created to oversee the introduction of the Tcard
