= Áo gấm =

Traditional tunic

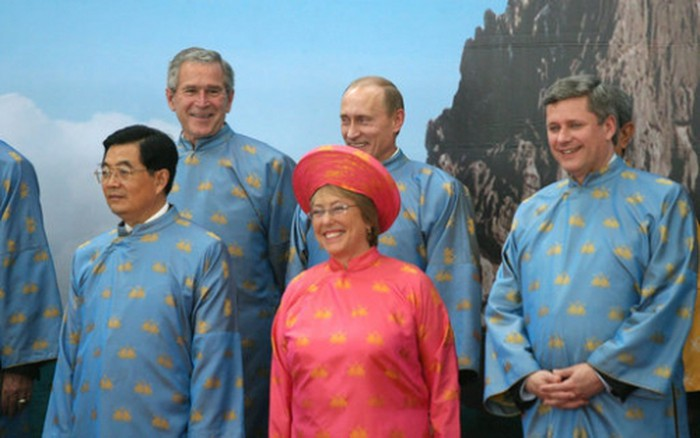
World leaders wearing áo gấm at APEC 2006

The áo gấm (Vietnamese: [ʔǎːw ɣə̌m]) is a modified áo dài made with thicker fabric, and is a traditional brocade tunic for men. It is more elaborate than the formal "áo the", a similar men's tunic. These tunics are often worn at ceremonies, birthdays, festivals and other circumstances where the women wear an expensive áo dài. The word gấm on its own means brocade hence "brocade tunic".

The elegance of the brocade tunic is proverbial, as per the Vietnamese saying áo gấm đi đêm ("a brocade tunic going in the dark"), meaning that someone can display their wealth or talents but in a too late time or where they cannot be seen.
