= Provincial Teacher Training College =

Teacher Training College in Cambodia

Coordinates: 13.38211°N 103.863137°E

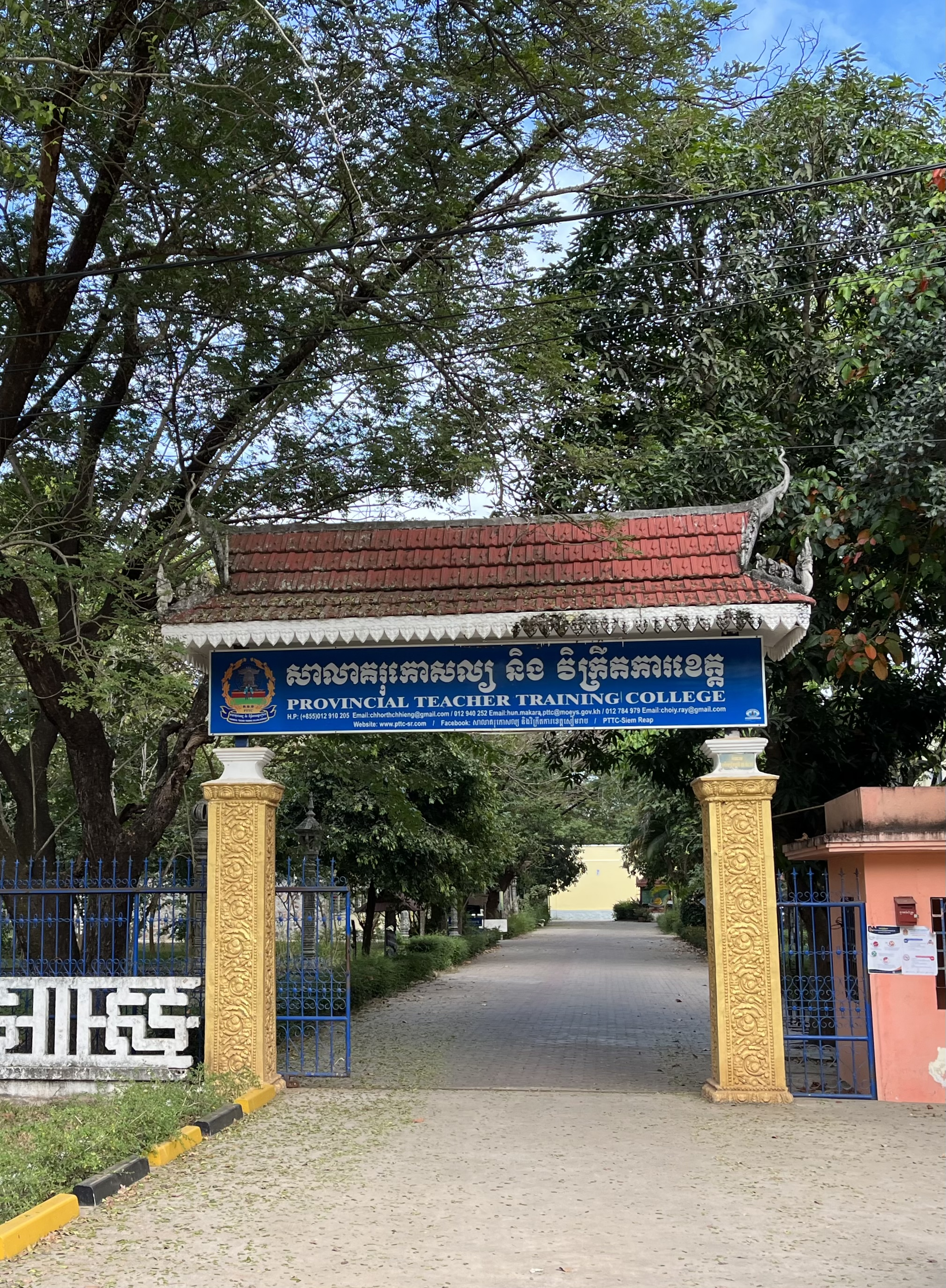
Entrance

The Provincial Teacher Training College (Khmer: សាលាគរុកោសល្យ និងវិក្រឹតការខេត្ត), located in Siem Reap, Siem Reap Province, Cambodia, is a two-year college for students, who enter after they have completed either 9 or 12 years of school education. Graduates of the college teach in primary schools in Cambodia.

== History ==
The college opened on March 27, 1980, a little over one year after the end of Pol Pot's Khmer Rouge regime. After several relocations, it is now at a site previously used as Soryavaraman II Secondary High School between Siem Reap and Angkor Wat.

== Curriculum ==
The curriculum includes general knowledge, educational professional skills and ICT. Teaching practice involves students being placed in one of several primary schools in and around Siem Reap. First year students have 6 weeks of practice, second year students 8 weeks.

== NGO Involvement ==
The school received assistance between 2004 and 2008 from Belgian group VVOB for "strengthening the methodology of primary school teachers"; they remain involved in 2013.

Since 2014 the TDSO, Teacher Development Support Organisation, a Cambodian local NGO, provides English Teacher Training to students at the PTTC

== See also ==
- Public holidays in Cambodia
