= Áo giao lĩnh =

Traditional Vietnamese cross-collared robe

- The canton chief and village authorities gathered in front of the đình wearing áo giao lĩnh (1915).
- Vietnamese: áo giao lĩnh áo tràng vạt
- Chữ Nôm: 襖交領 襖長祓
- Literal meaning: Shirt intersecting collar

The áo giao lĩnh (襖交領; lit. 'cross-collar robe'), often known as áo tràng vạt (襖長祓) or áo tràng xiên, or simply áo tràng, was a traditional robe worn by Vietnamese before the 19th century. It was typically worn by the royalty, the aristocracy, the nobility, and the commoners. During the Nguyễn dynasty, the áo ngũ thân was commonly worn and the áo giao lĩnh was only worn in formal occasions.

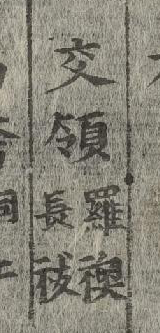
The jiaoling [garment] is the cross-collar robe. (Giao lĩnh là áo tràng vạt; 交領羅襖長祓)

== Construction and design ==
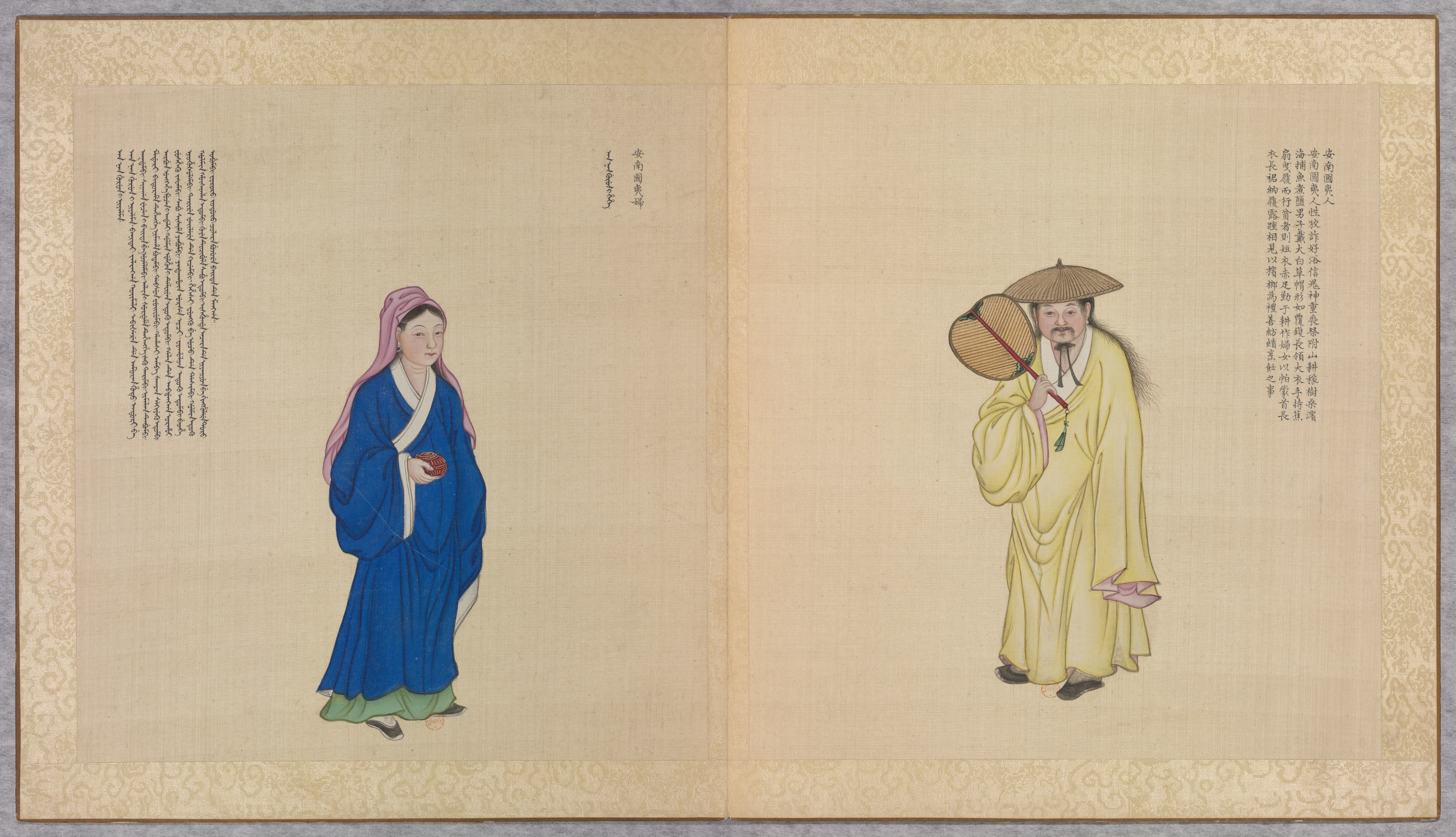
The Vietnamese civilians (man and woman) in Lê dynasty wearing áo giao lĩnh.

The áo giao lĩnh is a robe with a wrap collar closing on the right side. The wrap collar closing on the right side is known as jiaoling youren (Chinese: 交領右衽; lit. 'intersecting collar right lapel') in China; garments with this form of wrap collar originated in China and started to be worn at least since the Shang dynasty (c. 1600 BC– c. 1045 BC) before spreading to other countries. Although the design of the áo giao lĩnh was heavily influenced by China, it was less constrained in style compared to its Chinese counterpart; and thus, facilitated ease of movements to its wearer.

In the 17th and 18th century, the áo giao lĩnh worn by men was an ankle-level gown which could be used as part of a formal attire; it was composed of four-panel of fabric and was loose-fitting and featured a jiaoling youren collar, loose sleeves, and side slits. It was typically not decorated and black in colour. The women's áo giao lĩnh were also a non-decorated, four panel of fabric, loose fitting gown, similar to those worn by men. Women usually tied a sash around their waist when wearing the áo giao lĩnh; the áo giao lĩnh came in blue, black, brown colours while the sash was either white in colour or found in the same colour as the áo giao lĩnh.

== History ==
=== Prior to 18th century ===
Prior to the 18th century, nobles wore the áo giao lĩnh. During the Lê dynasty (1428–1789 AD), aristocrats wore the áo giao lĩnh.

=== 18th century ===
In the 18th century, the áo ngũ thân (the precursor of the áo dài) replaced the áo giao lĩnh in order to meet the clothing requirement decreed by the Nguyen dynasty court during the rule of Lord Nguyễn Phúc Khoát in 1744 in order to distinguish the clothing worn between the people under his rule from the people ruled by the Trinh Lords. The precursor of the áo dài then became the official clothing for both men and women in the South of Vietnam.

=== 19th century ===
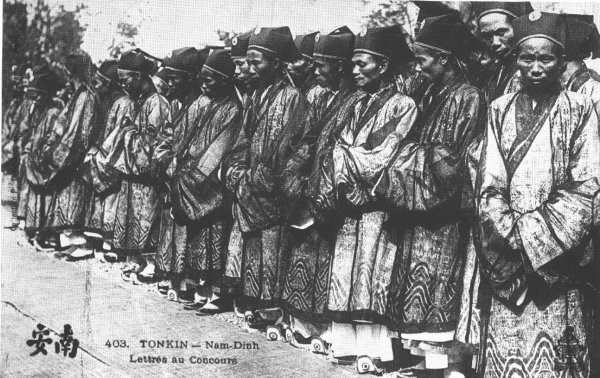
Examination graduates wearing an áo giao lĩnh.

In the 19th century, under the rule of Emperor Minh Mang (r. 1820–1841), the clothing in Vietnam was finally standardized throughout the entire country when Emperor Minh Mang decreed that the áo ngũ thân had to become the national dress for all the regions in 1830. The áo dài thus became the daily clothing of the Vietnamese.

=== 21st century ===
In the 21st century, áo giao lĩnh worn in the 15th century was depicted in a book titled Weaving a Realm published by the Vietnam Centre (a non-profit organization which aims to promote the culture and image of Vietnam). The authors of the book mostly consisted of dress makers, artists, stylists, photographers, proof readers and editors (but lacked the presence of historians and archeologists) attempted to reconstruct the ancient clothing worn by Vietnamese through extensive historical research. However, due to the lack of funds, the reconstructed clothing were not made with original materials or techniques.

== Gallery ==
Áo giao lĩnh as depicted in various paintings and photos

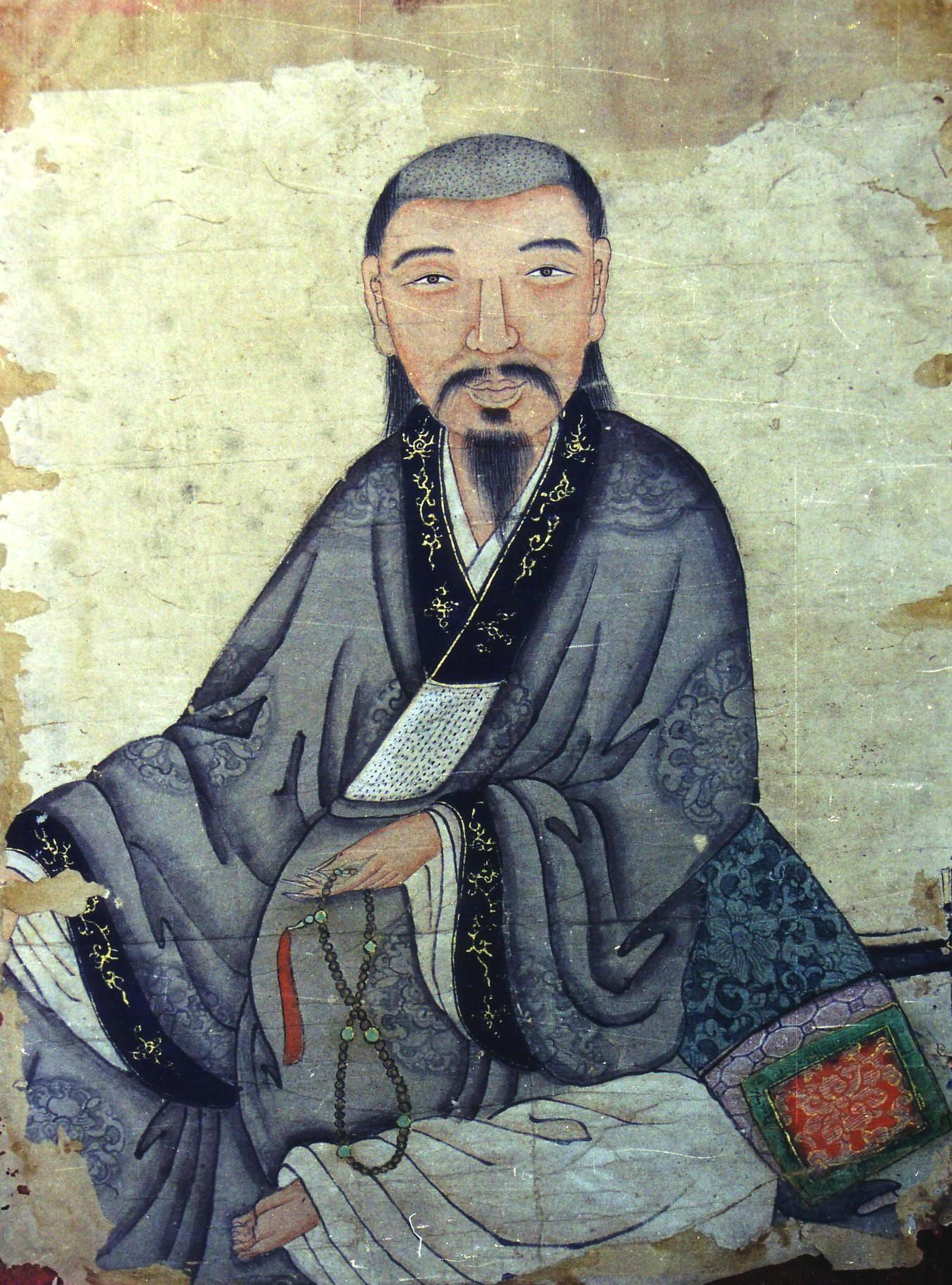
Portrait of Prince Nguyễn Phúc Thuần from the 17th century. He wears a cross-collared robe (áo giao lĩnh) which was commonly worn by Vietnamese aristocrats before the 19th century

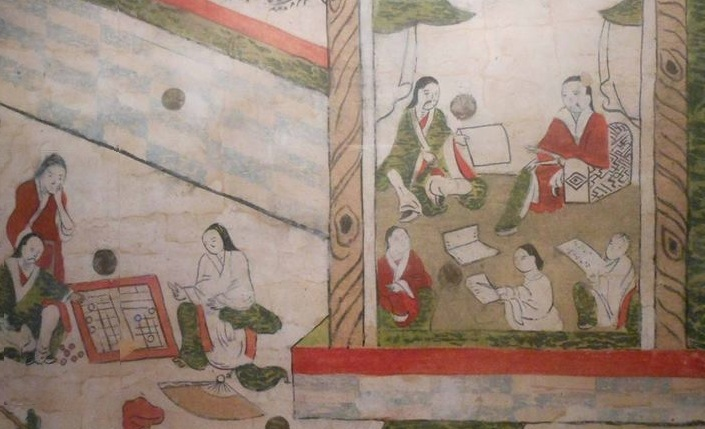
Giảng học đồ (講學圖; Lecture Picture), 18th century, Hanoi Museum of National History. Scholars and students wear cross-collared gowns (áo cổ chéo) – unlike the buttoned áo dài

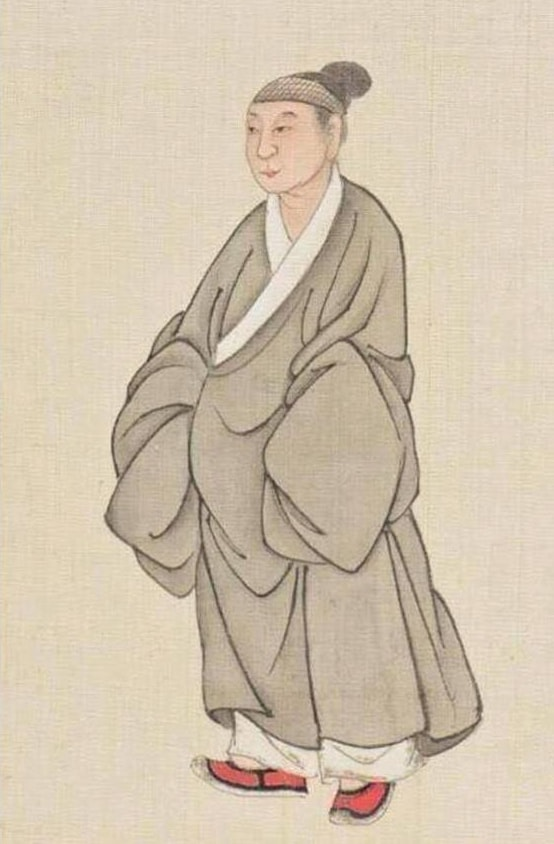
Official of Nguyễn lords depicted by the Qing dynasty.

Two women and a child in Hanoi around the 1700s.

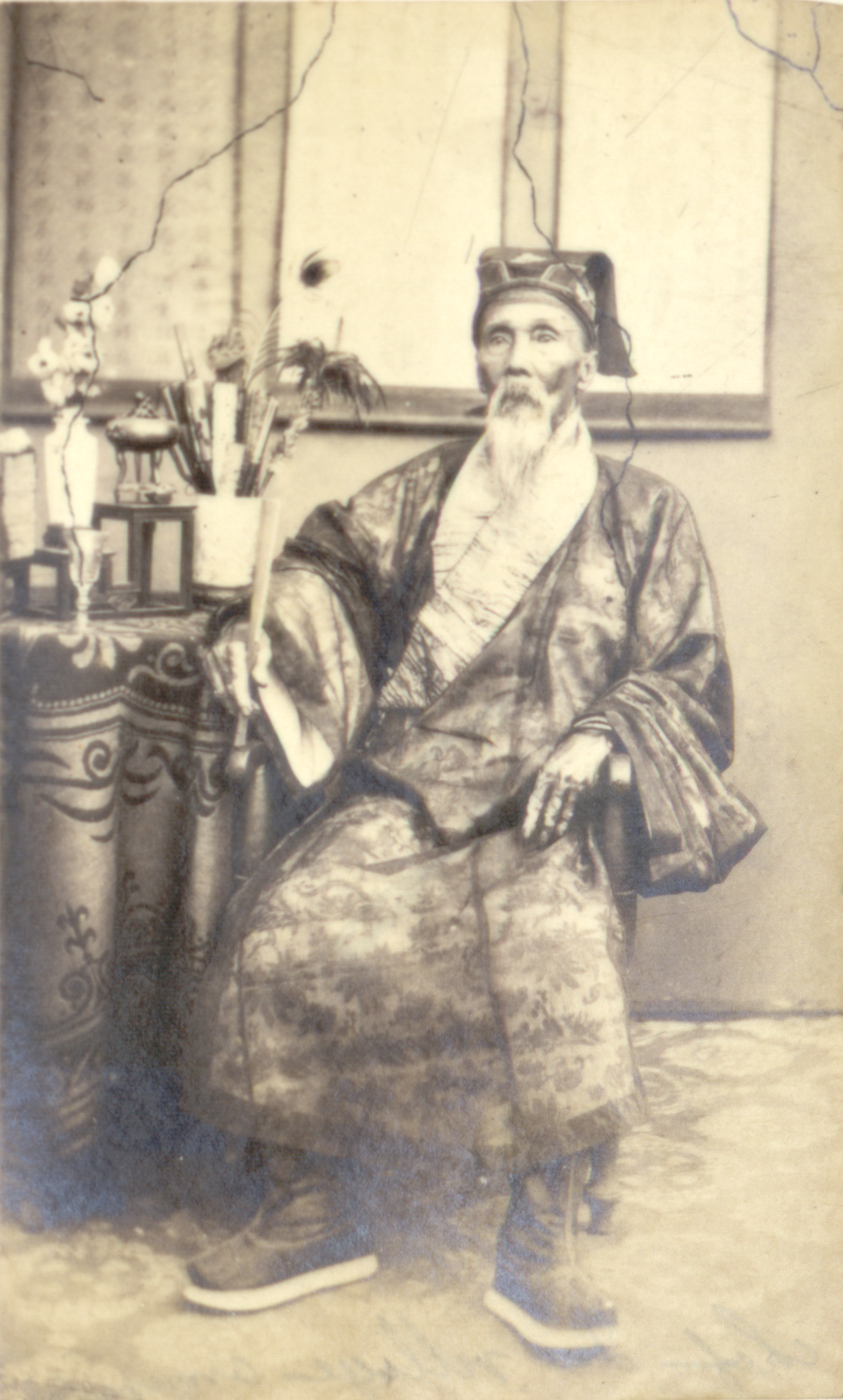
Vietnamese man wearing an áo giao lĩnh

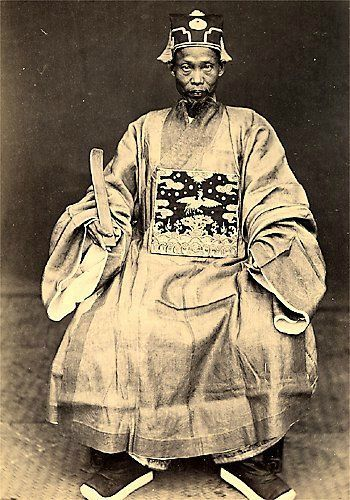
Nguyễn dynasty official wearing an áo giao lĩnh.

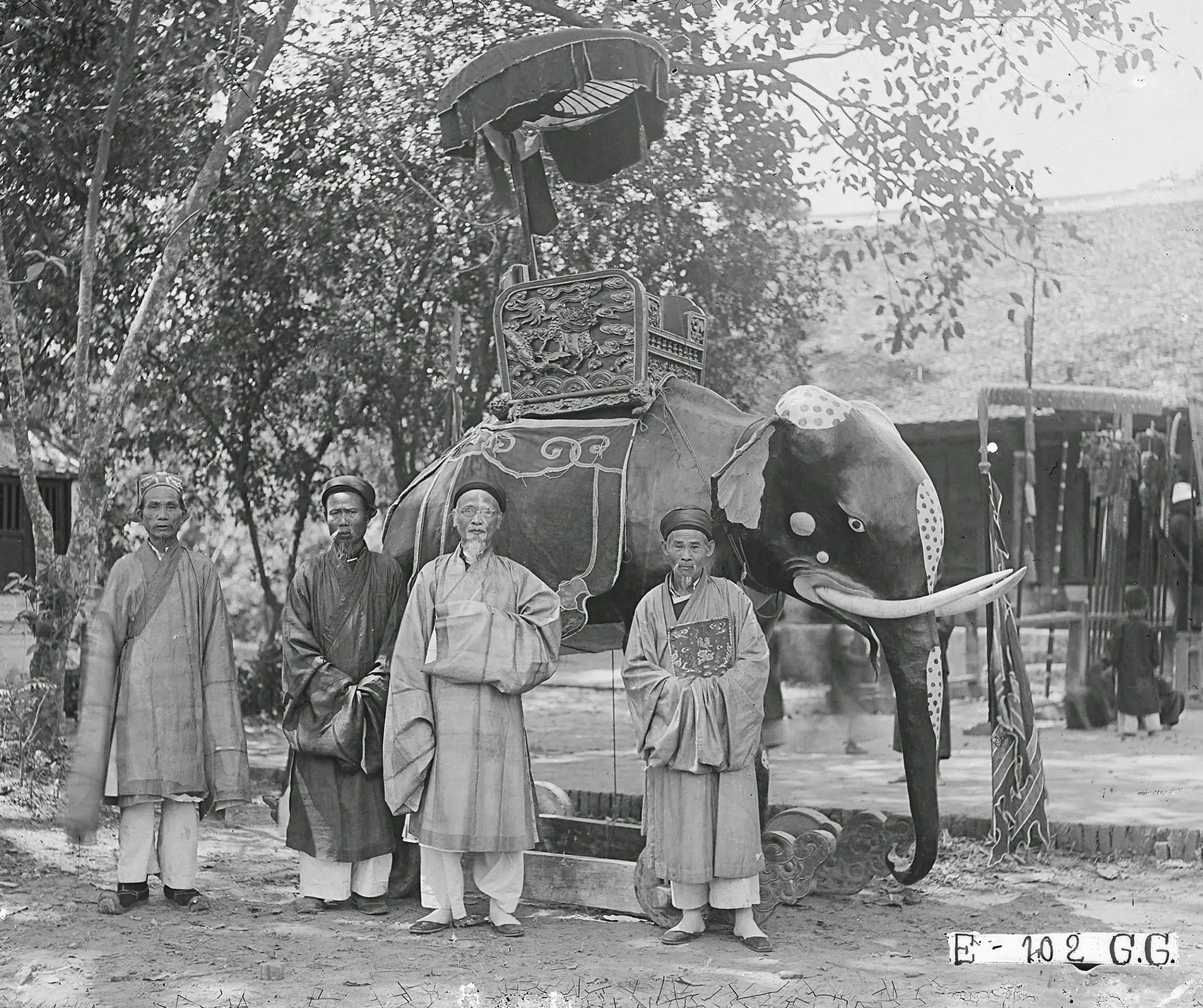
Men during the Hai Bà Trưng festival.

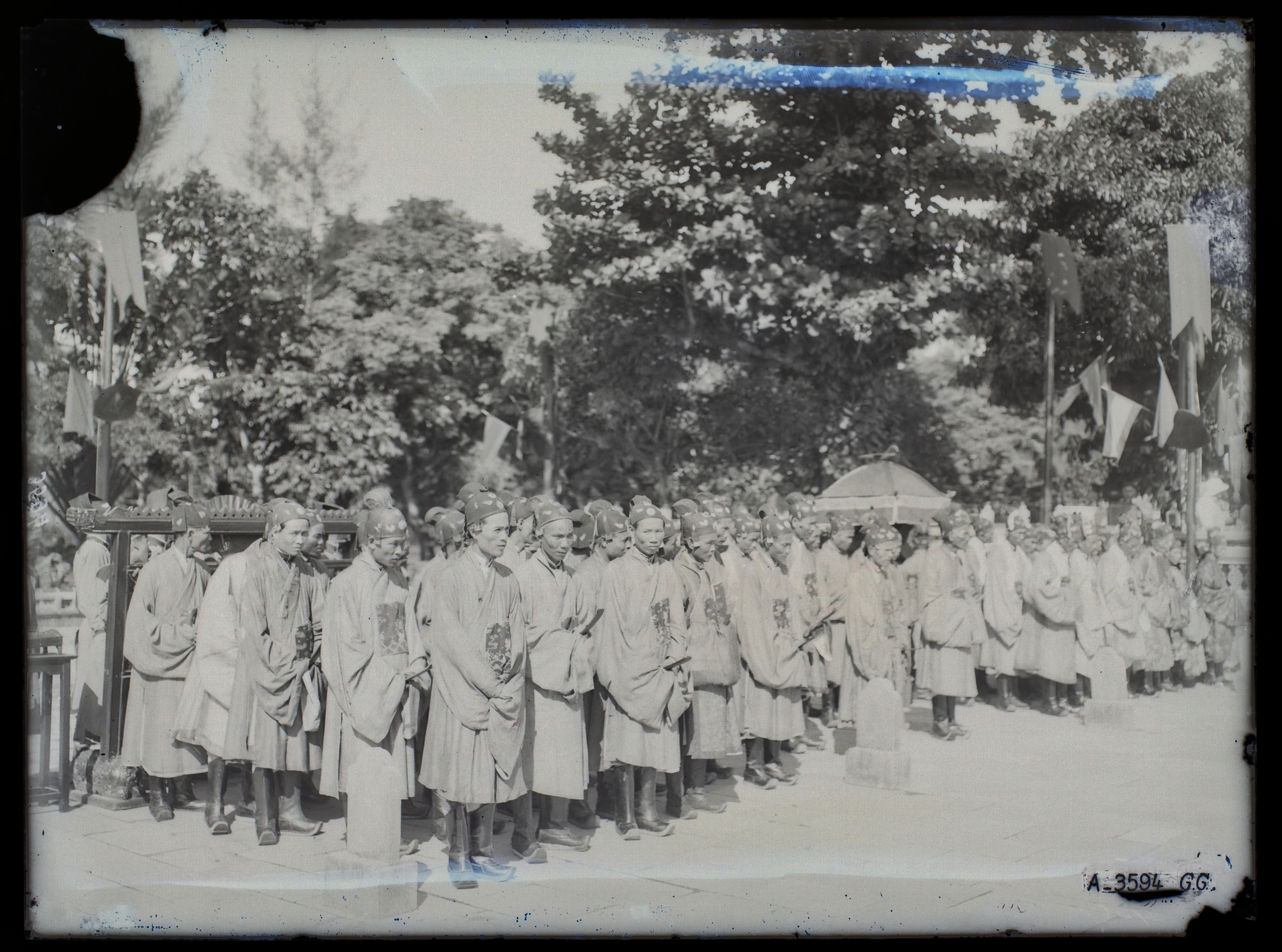
Officials during Emperor Khải Định's birthday wearing áo giao lĩnh.

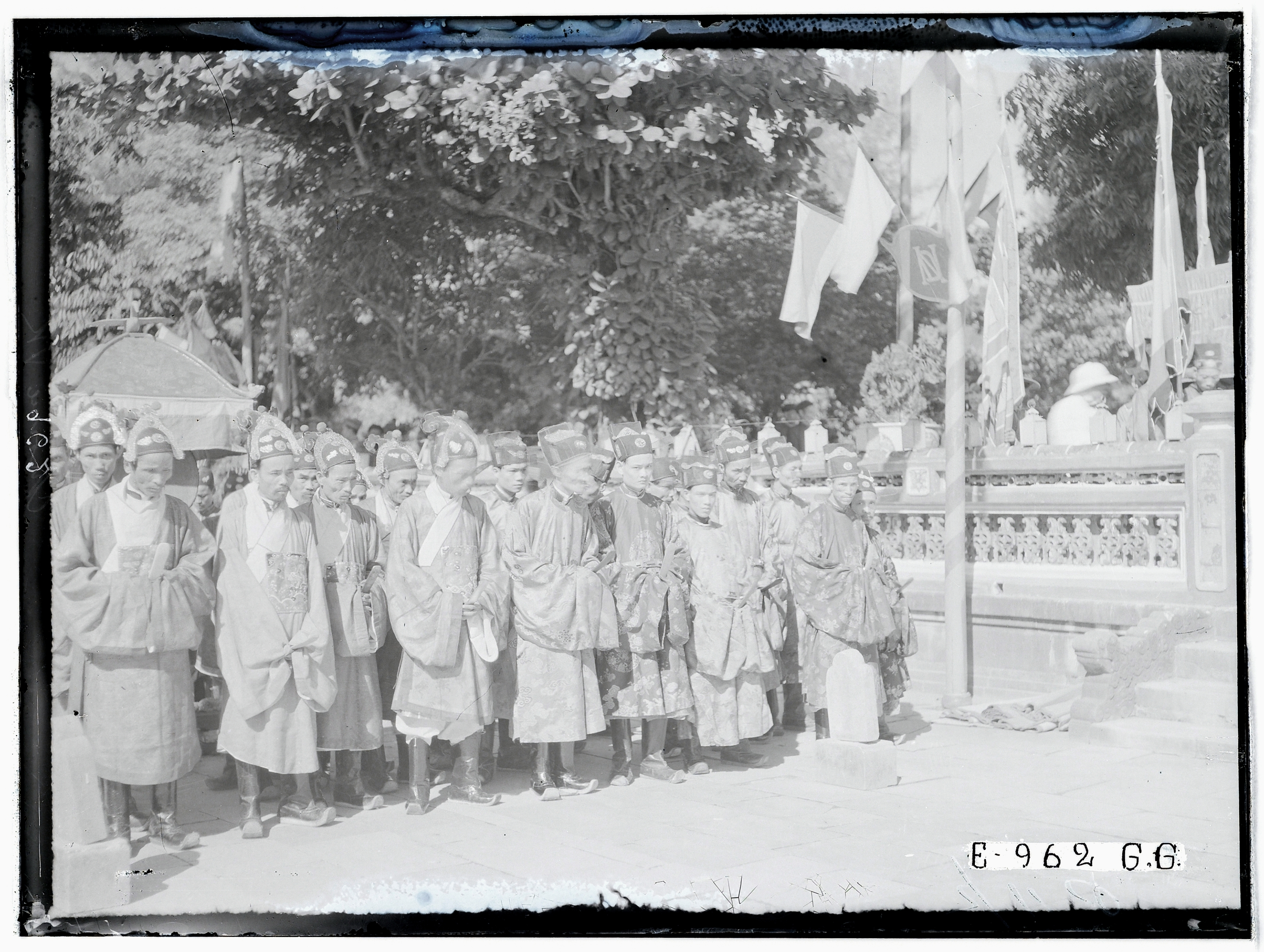
Officials during Emperor Khải Định's birthday wearing áo giao lĩnh and áo viên lĩnh.

== See also ==
- Áo dài
- Việt phục
