= Áo dài =

Traditional Vietnamese clothing

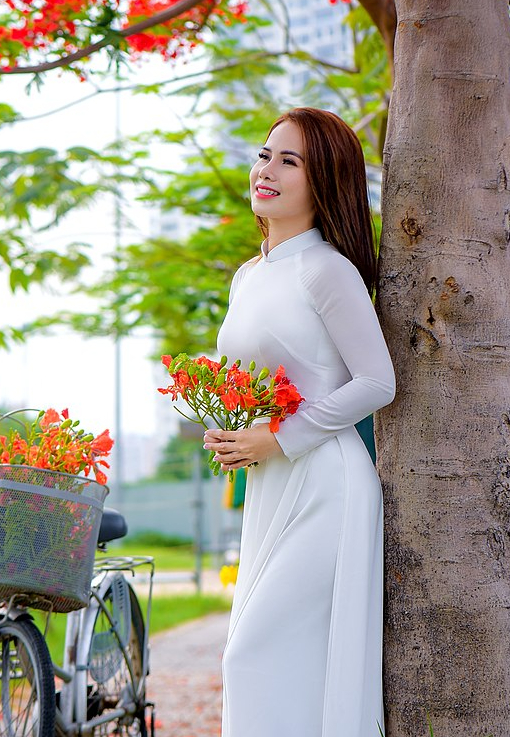
A woman wearing modernized version of white Áo dài

Áo dài (English: /ˈaʊˈzaɪ/; Vietnamese: [ʔaːw˧˦ zaːj˨˩] (North), [ʔaːw˦˥ jaːj˨˩] (South), lit. “long tunic”) is a traditional Vietnamese outfit consisting of a long split tunic worn over silk trousers. It has many variations, and can serve as formalwear for both men and women.

There are inconsistencies in the term áo dài. The currently most common usage is for a Francized design by Nguyễn Cát Tường (whose shop was named "Le Mur"), which is expressly a women's close-fitting design whose shirt is two pieces of cloth sewn together and fastened with buttons. A more specific term for this design would be "áo dài Le Mur". Other writers, especially those who claim its "traditionality", use áo dài as a general category of garments for both men and women, and include older designs such as áo ngũ thân (five-piece shirt), áo tứ thân (four-piece shirt), áo tấc (loose shirt), áo đối khâm (parallel-flap robe), áo viên lĩnh (round-collar robe), áo giao lĩnh (cross-collar robe), áo trực lĩnh (straight-collar robe).

== History ==
The predecessor of the áo dài was derived by the Nguyễn lords in Phú Xuân during 18th century. This outfit was derived from the áo ngũ thân, a five-piece shirt commonly worn in the 19th and early 20th centuries. The áo dài was later made to be form-fitting which was influenced by the French, Nguyễn Cát Tường and other Hanoi artists redesigned the áo dài as a modern shirt in the 1940s and 1950s. The updated look was promoted by the artists and magazines of Tự Lực văn đoàn (Self-Reliant Literary Group) as a national costume for the modern era. In the 1950s, Saigon designers tightened the fit to produce the version worn by Vietnamese women. The áo dài for women was extremely popular in South Vietnam in the 1960s and early 1970s. On Tết and other occasions, Vietnamese men may wear an áo gấm (brocade long shirt), a version of the áo dài made of very thick fabric and with sewed symbols.

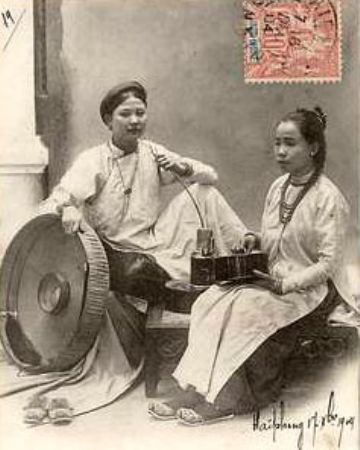
Two women wear áo ngũ thân, the predecessor of the áo dài initially worn in the 18th century.

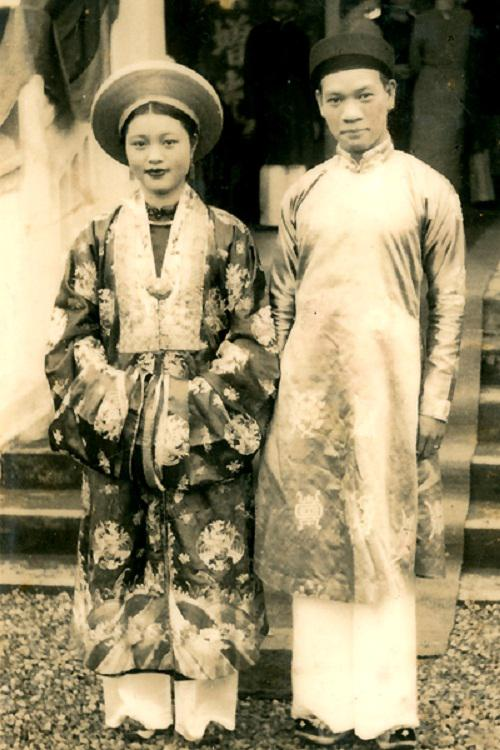
Vietnamese official (right) in áo ngũ thân with khăn vấn while his wife worn áo nhật bình.

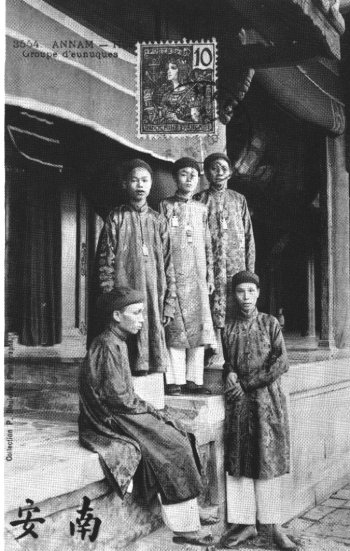
Vietnamese Nguyễn dynasty's eunuchs in áo ngũ thân.

The áo dài has traditionally been marketed with a feminine appeal, with "Miss Ao Dai" pageants being popular in Vietnam and with overseas Vietnamese. However, the men version of áo dài or modified áo dài are also worn during weddings or formal occasions. The áo dài is one of the few Vietnamese words that appear in English-language dictionaries. (Note: "Ao dai" appears in the Oxford English Dictionary, the American Heritage Dictionary (2004), and the Random House Unabridged Dictionary (2006). Other Vietnamese words that appear include "Tet", "Vietminh", "Vietcong", and "pho" (rice noodles).) The áo dài can be paired with the nón lá or the khăn vấn.

== Parts of shirt ==
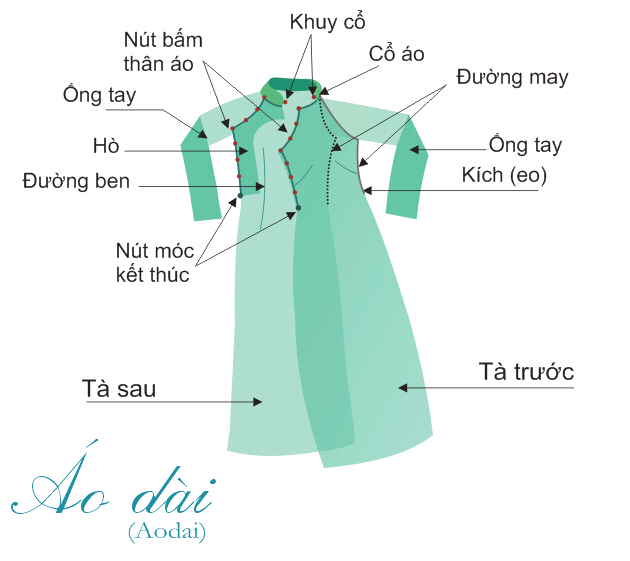
Diagram showing the parts of shirt

- Tà sau: back flap
- Nút bấm thân áo: hooks used as fasteners and holes
- Ống tay: sleeve
- Đường bên: inside seam
- Nút móc kết thúc: main hook and hole
- Tà trước: front flap
- Khuy cổ: collar button
- Cổ áo: collar
- Đường may: seam
- Kích (eo): waist

== Origin ==
Vietnamese garments throughout the centuries

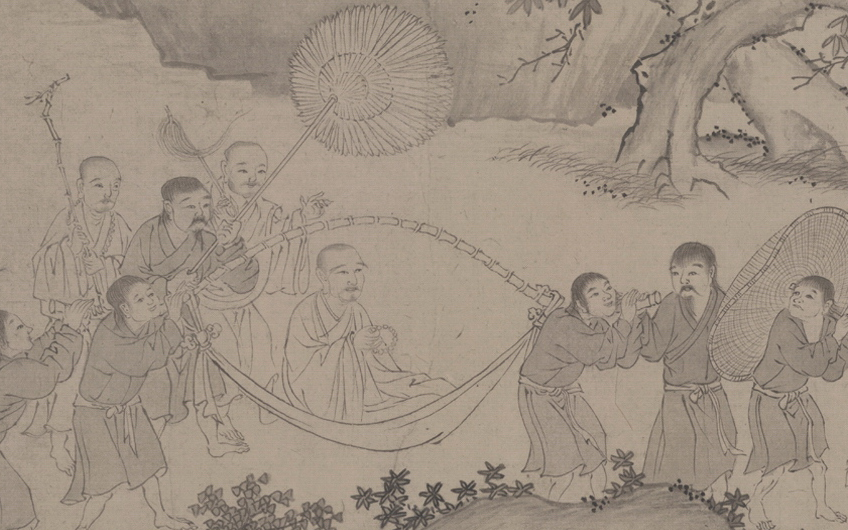
Trần dynasty robes as depicted in a section of a 14th-century scroll.

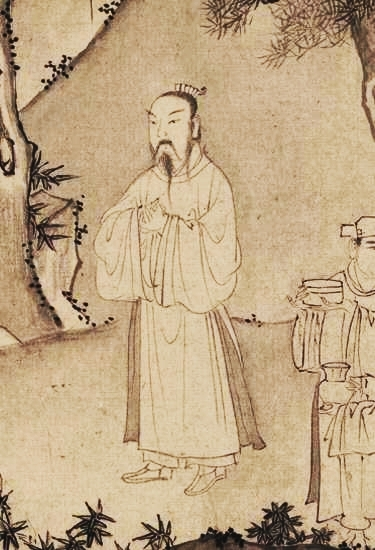
Trần Anh Tông wearing a áo viên lĩnh and outside a áo giao lĩnh in the calligraphy painting Trúc Lâm đại sĩ xuất sơn đồ (The painting of Trúc Lâm the Great Master), 14th century.

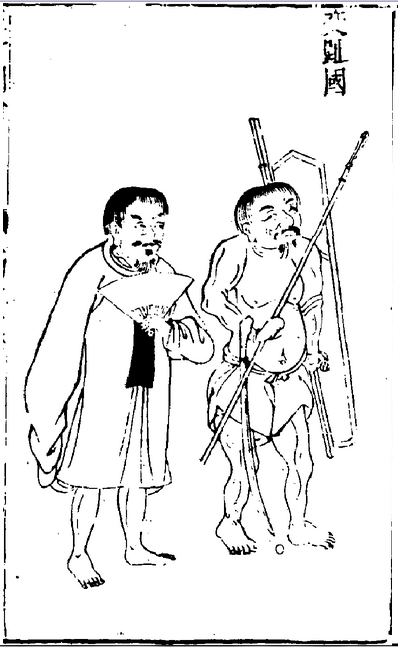
A Vietnamese man on the left is wearing áo tứ điên in Sancai Tuhui, early 17th century during the Lê dynasty.

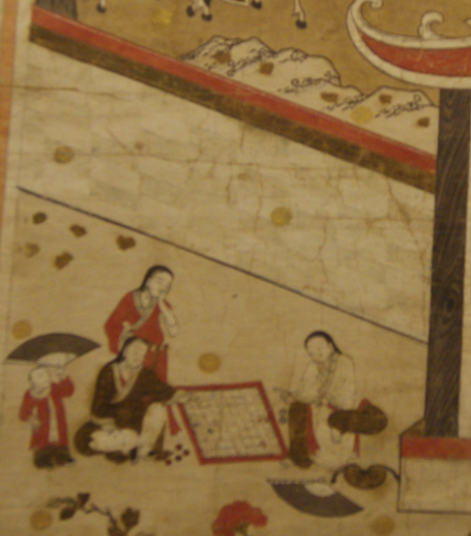
"Giảng học đồ" (Teaching), 18th century, Hanoi museum of National History. Scholars and students wear áo giao lĩnh (cross-collar robe) - unlike the buttoned áo dài.

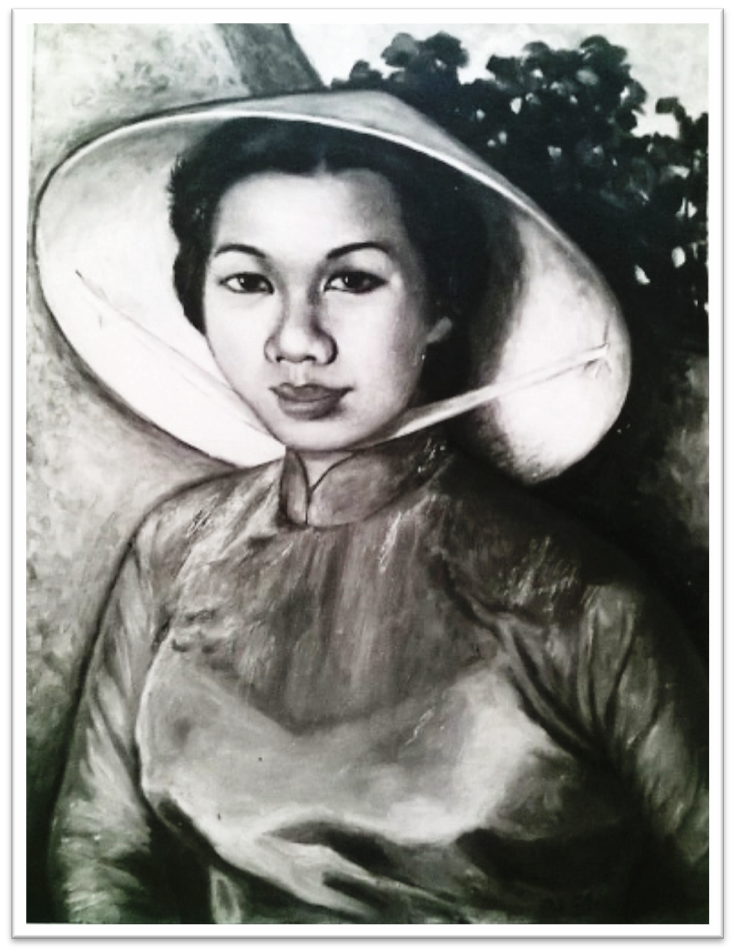
A woman wearing a nón lá with áo dài, as worn in the 20th and 21st centuries.

=== Switch to trousers ===
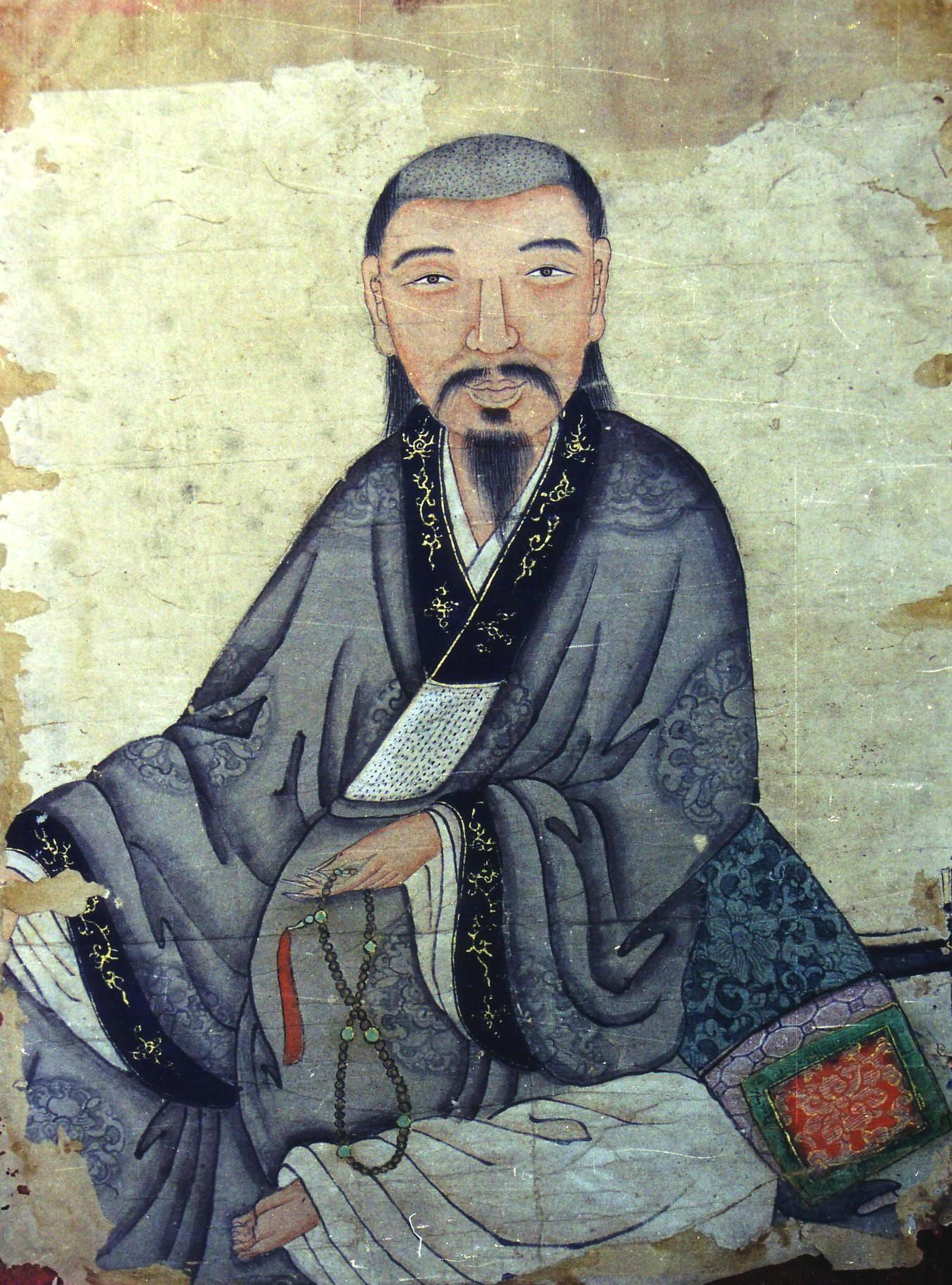
Portrait of Tôn Thất Hiệp (1653–1675). He wears a cross-collar robe (áo giao lĩnh) which was commonly worn by all social castes of Vietnam before the 19th century

For centuries, peasant women typically wore a halter top (yếm) underneath a blouse or overcoat, alongside a skirt (váy). Aristocrats, on the other hand, favored a cross-collar robe called áo giao lĩnh. When the Ming dynasty occupied Đại Việt during the Fourth Era of Northern Domination in 1407, it forced the women to wear Chinese-style pants. The following Lê dynasty also criticized women for violating Neo-Confucian dress norms, but only enforced the dress code haphazardly, so skirts and halter tops remained the norm. During the 17th and 18th centuries, Vietnam was divided into northern and southern realms, with the Nguyễn lords ruling the south. To distinguish the southern people from the northerners, in 1744, Lord Nguyễn Phúc Khoát of Huế decreed that both men and women at his court wear trousers and a gown with buttons down the front. (Note: A court historian described the costume in Huế as follows: "Outside court, men and women wear gowns with straight collars and short sleeves. The sleeves are large or small depending on the wearer. There are seams on both sides running down from the sleeve, so the gown is not open anywhere. Men may wear a round collar and a short sleeve for more convenience." ("Thường phục thì đàn ông, đàn bà dùng áo cổ đứng ngắn tay, cửa ống tay rộng hoặc hẹp tùy tiện. Áo thì hai bên nách trở xuống phải khâu kín liền, không được xẻ mở. Duy đàn ông không muốn mặc áo cổ tròn ống tay hẹp cho tiện khi làm việc thì được phép…") (from Đại Nam Thực Lục [Records of Đại Nam])) The members of the southern court were thus distinguished from the courtiers of the Trịnh Lords in Hanoi, who wore áo giao lĩnh with long skirts.

According to Lê Quý Đôn's record in the book "Phủ Biên Tạp Lục" (recording most of the important information about the economy and society of Đàng Trong for nearly 200 years), the áo dài (or rather, the forerunner of the áo dài) was created by Lord Nguyễn Phúc Khoát based on Chinese Ming dynasty costumes, using the method of making costumes in the book "Sāncái Túhuì" as the standard.

=== 19th century ===
The áo ngũ thân (five-piece shirt) had two flaps sewn together in the back, two flaps sewn together in the front, and a "baby flap" hidden underneath the main front flap. The gown appeared to have two-flaps with slits on both sides, features preserved in the later áo dài. Compared to a modern áo dài, the front and back flaps were much broader and the fit looser and much shorter. It had a high collar and was buttoned in the same fashion as a modern áo dài. Women could wear the shirt with the top few buttons undone, revealing a glimpse of their yếm underneath.

=== 20th century ===
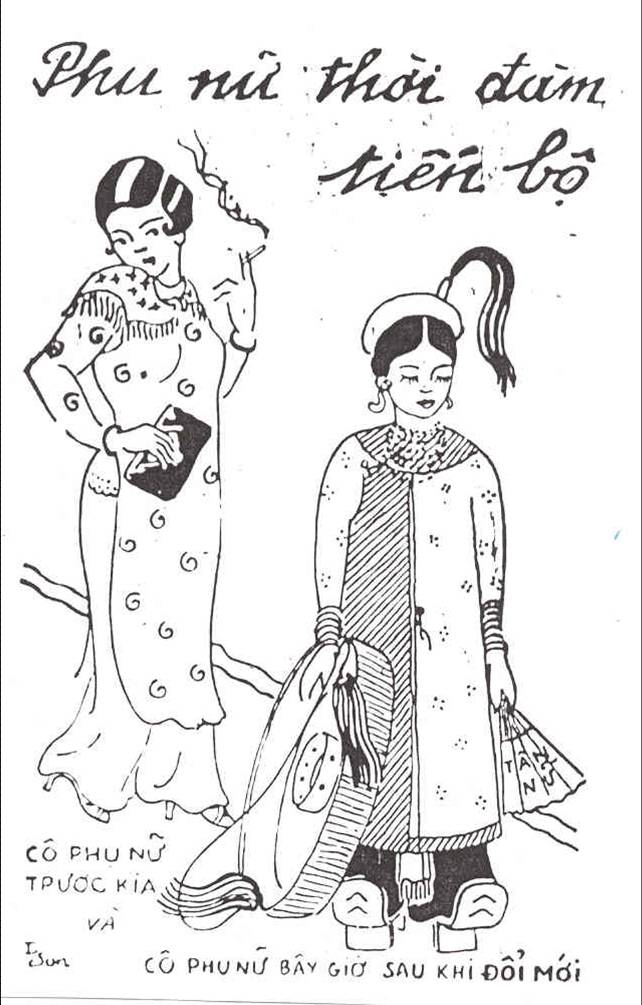
In the 1930s, áo dài was considered a progressive innovation compared to the traditional áo ngũ thân

==== Modernization of style ====
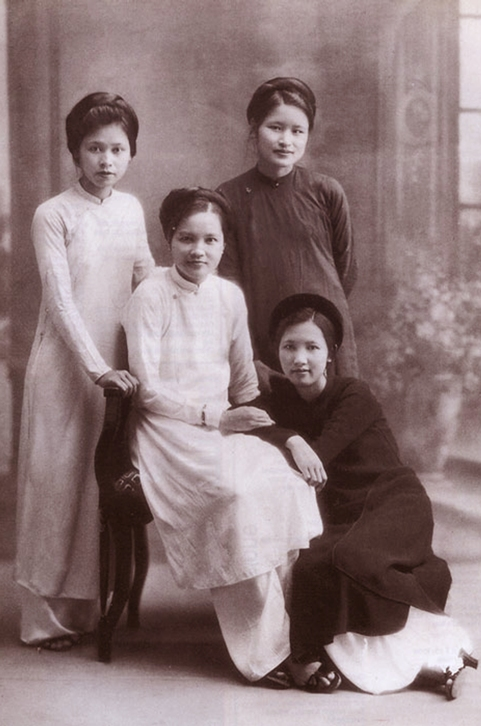
The "four great beauties of Hanoi" in Le Mur style áo dài, 1938

Huế's Đồng Khánh Girls' High School, which opened in 1917, was widely praised for the áo dài uniform worn by its students. The first modernized áo dài appeared at a Paris fashion show in 1921. In 1930, Hanoi artist Cát Tường, also known as Le Mur, designed a shirt inspired by the áo ngũ thân and by Paris fashions. It reached to the floor and fit the curves of the body by using darts and a nipped-in waist. When fabric became inexpensive, the rationale for multiple layers and thick flaps disappeared. Modern textile manufacture allows for wider panels, eliminating the need to sew narrow panels together. The áo dài Le Mur, or "trendy" áo dài, created a sensation when model Nguyễn Thị Hậu wore it for a feature published by the newspaper Today in January 1935. The style was promoted by the artists of Tự Lực văn đoàn ("Self-Reliant Literary Group") as a national costume for the modern era. The painter Lê Phô introduced several popular styles of ao dai beginning in 1934. Such Westernized garments temporarily disappeared during World War II (1939–45).

In the 1950s, Saigon (now Ho Chi Minh City) designers tightened the fit of the áo dài to create the version commonly seen today. Trần Kim of Thiết Lập Tailors and Dũng of Dũng Tailors created a shirt with raglan sleeves and a diagonal seam that runs from the collar to the underarm. Madame Nhu, first lady of South Vietnam, popularized a boat neck version beginning in 1958. The áo dài was most popular from 1960 to 1975. A brightly colored áo dài hippy was introduced in 1968. The áo dài mini, a version designed for practical use and convenience, had slits that extended above the waist and panels that reached only to the knee.

==== Under communism ====
The áo dài has always been more common in the South than in the North. The communists, who gained power in the North in 1954 and in the South in 1975, had conflicted feelings about the áo dài. They praised it as a national costume and one was worn to the Paris Peace Conference (1969–73) by Viet Cong negotiator Nguyễn Thị Bình. Yet Westernized versions of the shirt and those associated with "decadent" Saigon (Ho Chi Minh City) of the 1960s and early 1970s were condemned. Economic crisis, famine, and war with Cambodia combined to make the 1980s a fashion low point. The áo dài was rarely worn except at weddings and other formal occasions, with the older, looser-fitting style preferred. Overseas Vietnamese, meanwhile, kept tradition alive with "Miss Ao Dai" pageants (Hoa Hậu Áo Dài), the most notable one held annually in Long Beach, California.

The áo dài experienced a revival beginning in late 1980s, when state enterprise and schools began adopting the áo dài as a uniform again. In 1989, 16,000 Vietnamese attended a Miss Ao Dai Beauty Contest held in Ho Chi Minh City. When the Miss International Pageant in Tokyo gave its "Best National Costume" award to an áo dài-clad Trương Quỳnh Mai in 1995, Thời Trang Trẻ (New Fashion Magazine) claimed that Vietnam's "national soul" was "once again honored". An "áo dài craze" followed that lasted for several years and led to wider use of the áo dài as a school uniform.

== Present day ==
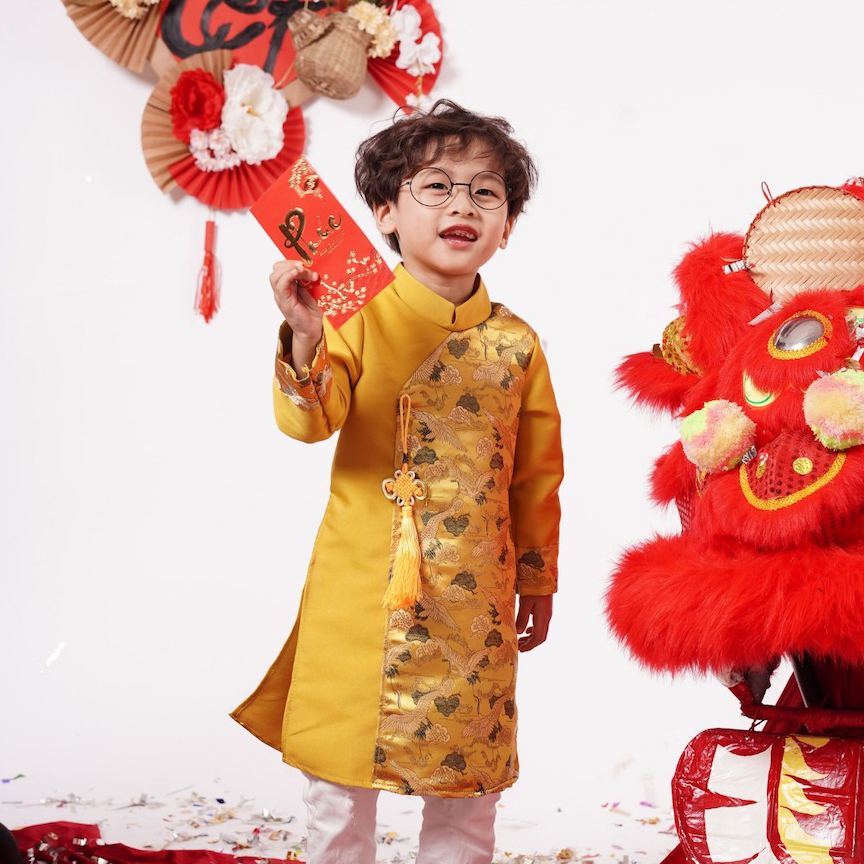
A boy wearing áo dài

No longer deemed politically controversial, áo dài fashion design is supported by the Vietnamese government. It is often called áo dài Việt Nam to link it to patriotic feelings. Designer Le Si Hoang is a celebrity in Vietnam and his shop in Ho Chi Minh City is the place to visit for those who admire the áo dài. In Hanoi, tourists get fitted with áo dài on Luong Van Can Street. The elegant city of Huế in the central region is known for its áo dài and nón lá (lit. 'leaf hat').

The áo dài is now a standard for weddings, for celebrating Tết and for other formal occasions. It is the required uniform for female teachers (mostly from high school to below) and female students in common high schools in the South; there is no requirement for color or pattern for teachers while students use plain white or with some small patterns like flowers for use as school uniforms. Companies often require their female staff to wear uniforms that include the áo dài, so flight attendants, receptionists, bank female staff, restaurant staff, and hotel workers in Vietnam may be seen wearing it.

The most popular style of áo dài fits tightly around the wearer's upper shirt, emphasizing her bust and curves. Although the shirt covers the entire body, it is thought to be provocative, especially when made of thin fabric. "The áo dài covers everything, but hides nothing", according to one saying. The shirt must be individually fitted and usually requires several weeks for a tailor to complete. Áo dài costs about $200 in the United States and about $40 in Vietnam.

"Symbolically, the áo dài invokes nostalgia and timelessness associated with a gendered image of the homeland for which many Vietnamese people throughout the diaspora yearn," wrote Nhi T. Lieu, an assistant professor at the University of Texas at Austin. The difficulties of working while wearing áo dài link the garment to frailty and innocence, she wrote. Vietnamese writers who favor the use of the áo dài as a school uniform cite the inconvenience of wearing it as an advantage, a way of teaching students feminine behavior such as modesty, caution, and a refined manner.

The áo dài is featured in an array of Asian-themed or related movies. In Good Morning, Vietnam (1987), Robin Williams's character is wowed by áo dài-clad women when he first arrives in Ho Chi Minh City. The 1992 films Indochine and The Lover inspired several international fashion houses to design áo dài collections, including Prada's SS08 collection and a Giorgio Armani collection. In the Vietnamese film The White Silk Dress (2007), an áo dài is the sole legacy that the mother of a poverty-stricken family has to pass on to her daughters. The Hanoi City Complex, a 65-story building now under construction, will have an áo dài-inspired design. Vietnamese designers created áo dài for the contestants in the Miss Universe beauty contest, which was held July 2008 in Nha Trang, Vietnam. The most prominent annual Ao Dai Festival outside of Vietnam is held each year in San Jose, California, a city that is home to a large Vietnamese American community. This event features an international array of designer áo dài under the direction of festival founder, Jenny Do.

In recent years, a shorter, more modern version of the áo dài, known as the áo dài cách tân, is often worn by the younger generation. This modern áo dài has a shorter front and back flap, hitting just below the knees.

== Criticism ==
Áo dài is the traditional attire of Vietnam, considered a symbol of the graceful and elegant beauty of Vietnamese women. However, besides the praises, áo dài it is met with criticism from some. One of the most common criticisms of áo dài is excessive modernisation. In recent years, the modernised type has become very popular, with a variety of styles, materials, and colors. However, some people believe that excessive modernisation has eroded the "traditional beauty" of áo dài. They believe that áo dài should keep its traditional style, material, and color, in order to enhance the gentle and elegant beauty of Vietnamese women. Another criticism of áo dài is the wearing of áo dài in a way that is seen as offensive. In recent years, there have been many cases of celebrities being criticized for wearing "offensive" áo dài. They were accused of using áo dài to show off their bodies, causing offense to the viewer. In addition, áo dài is also criticized as being incompatible with modern life. Áo dài is a traditional costume designed to be worn on formal occasions and festivals. However, in modern life, many people believe that áo dài is not suitable for everyday activities, such as going to school, going to work, going out, etc.

== Similar garments ==
The áo dài is similar in appearance to the cheongsam, both consisting of a long robe with side splits on both sides of the robe, with one of the main differences typically being the height of the side split.

Áo dài is also similar in appearance to the shalwar kameez and kurta of as India and Pakistan as well, for they are both forms of clothing consisting of a long split tunic worn over trousers. The main difference is that the áo dài usually has a row of buttons that cross from the neck down to the hips while the rest of the garments have a row of buttons in the front. The shalwar kameez and kurta also lack a mandarin collar while the áo dài typically has one.

== Gallery ==
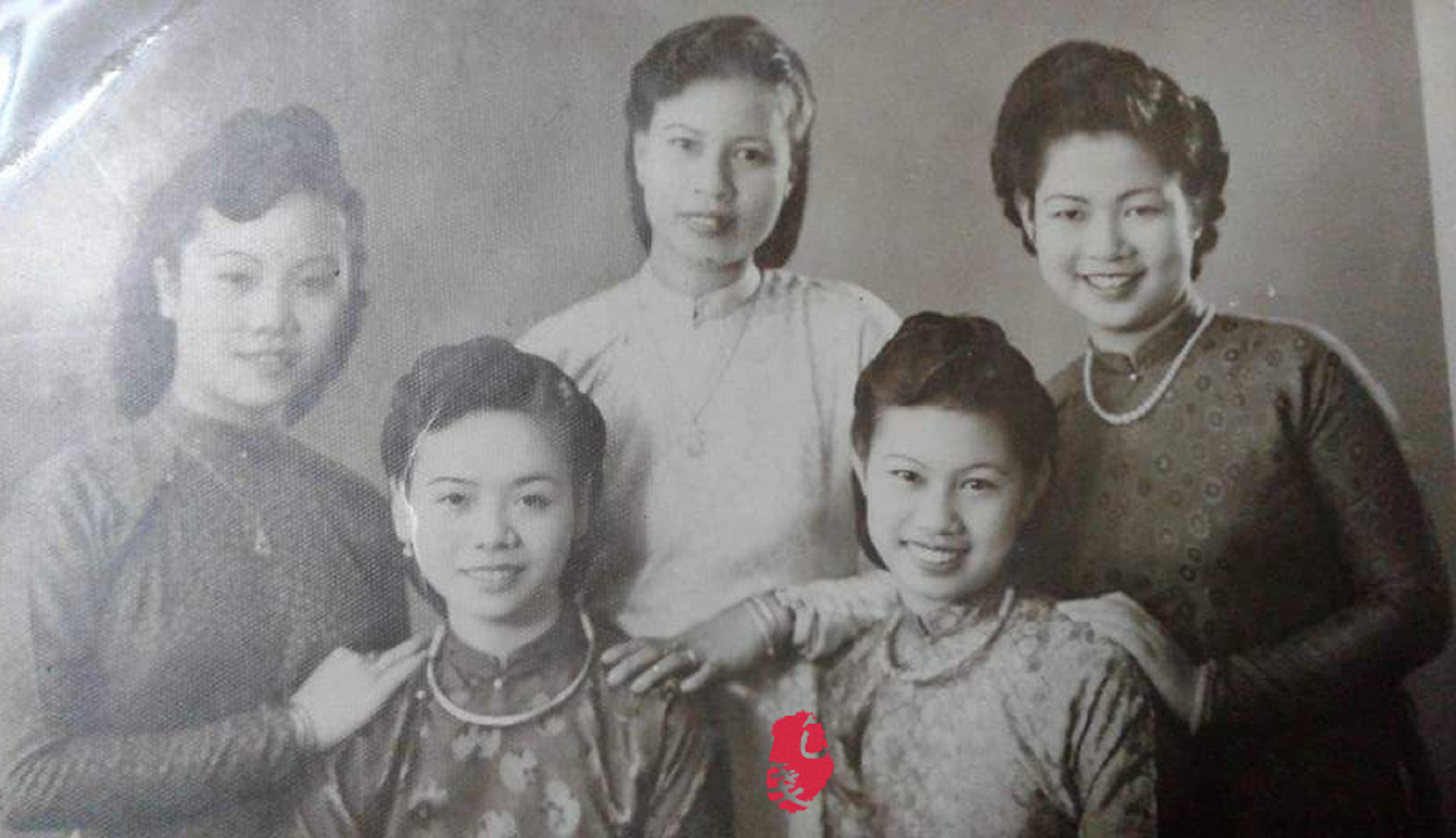
Five Hanoi sisters wearing áo dài, 1950s

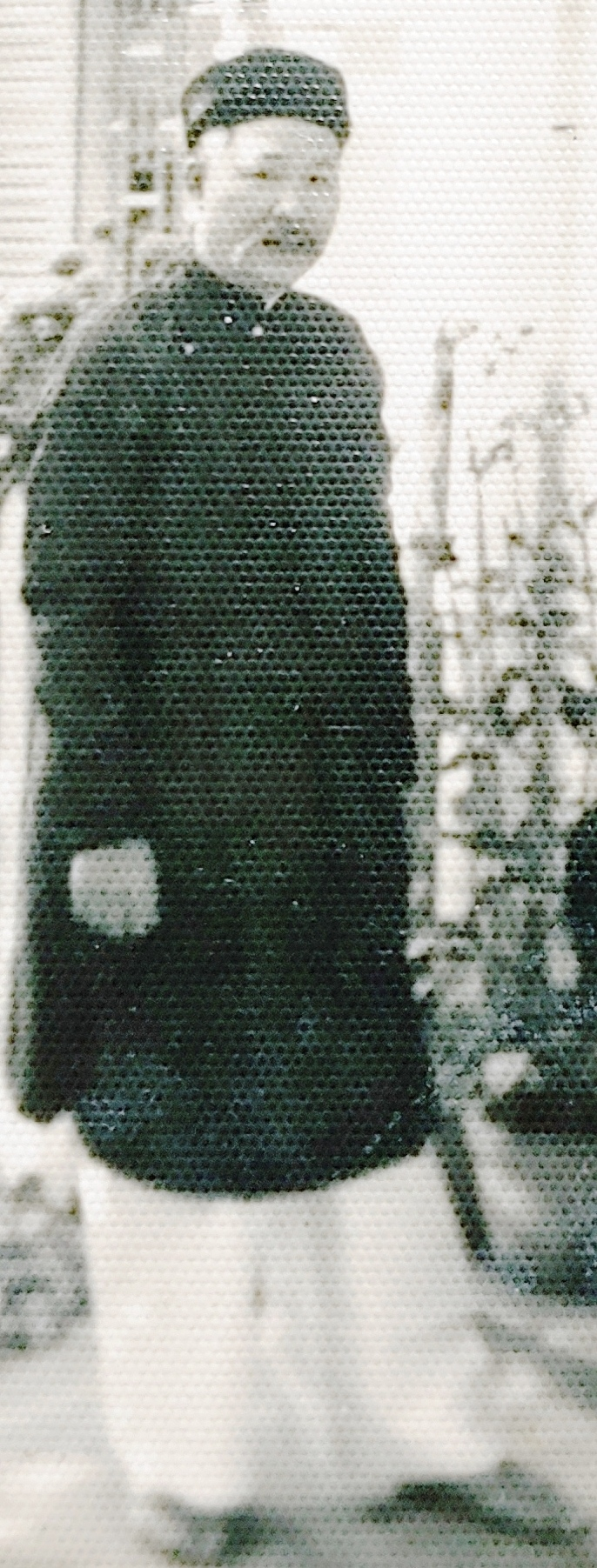
Saigon old man wearing traditional áo dài and Khăn vấn, Tết 1963

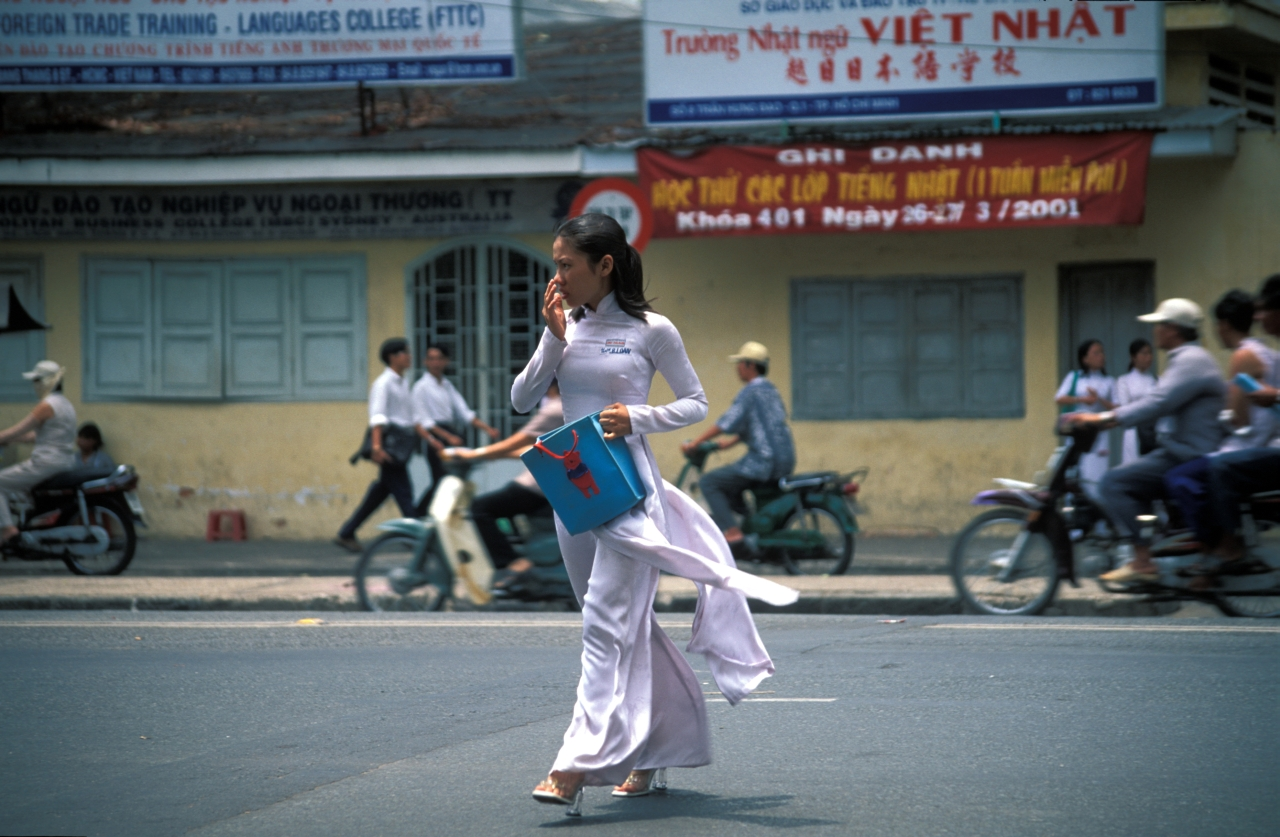
A female student wearing áo dài

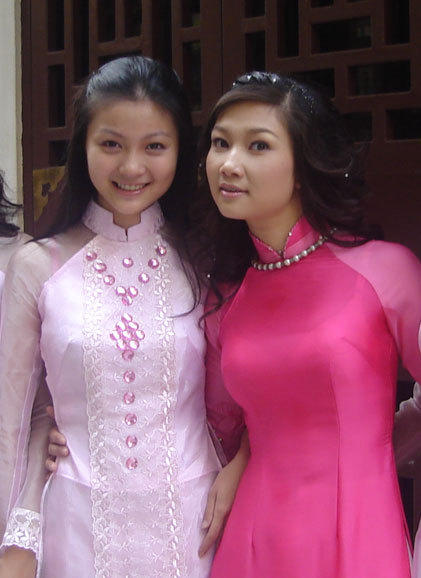
Two woman wearing pink áo dài

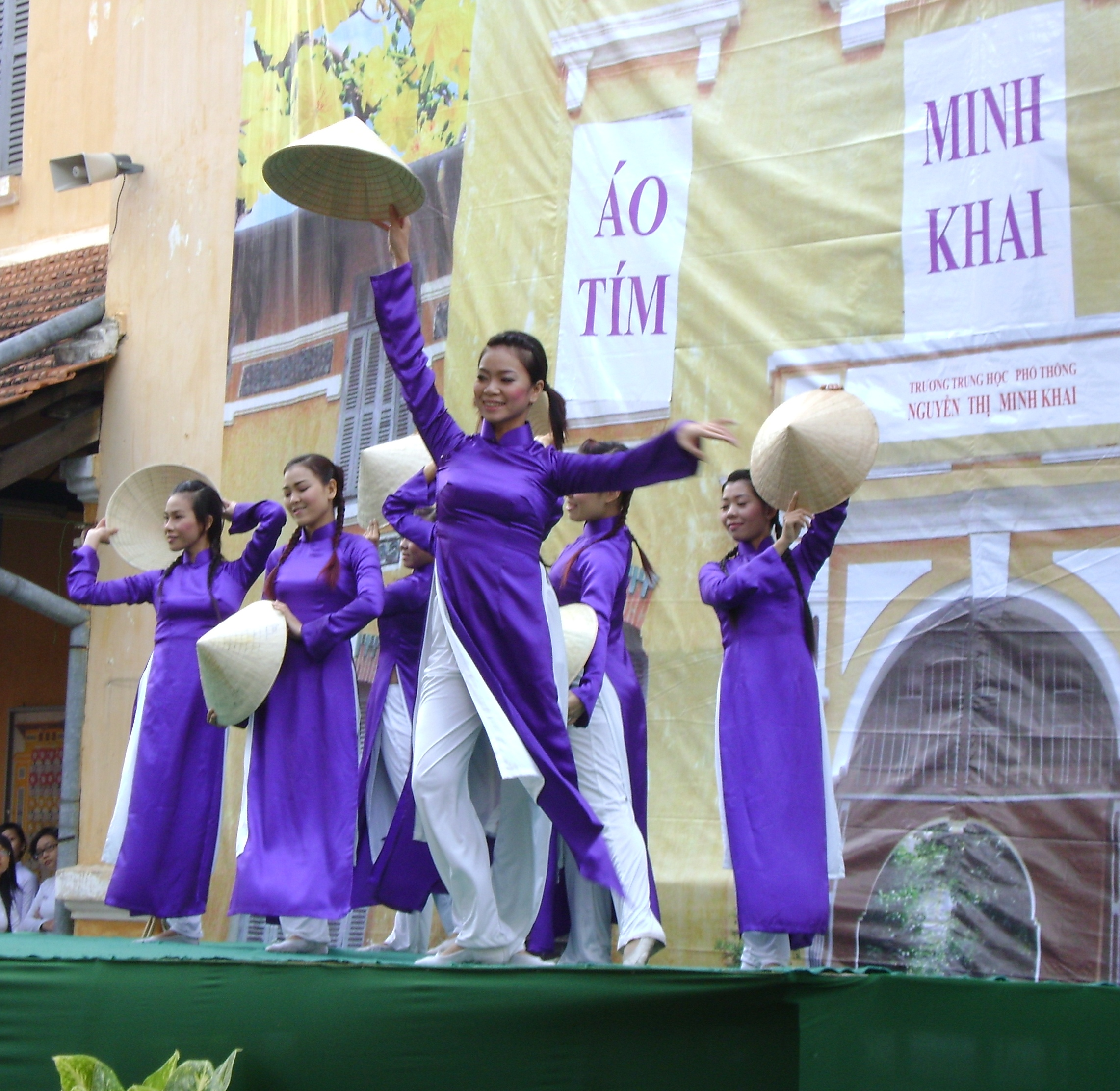
The female students wearing purple áo dài

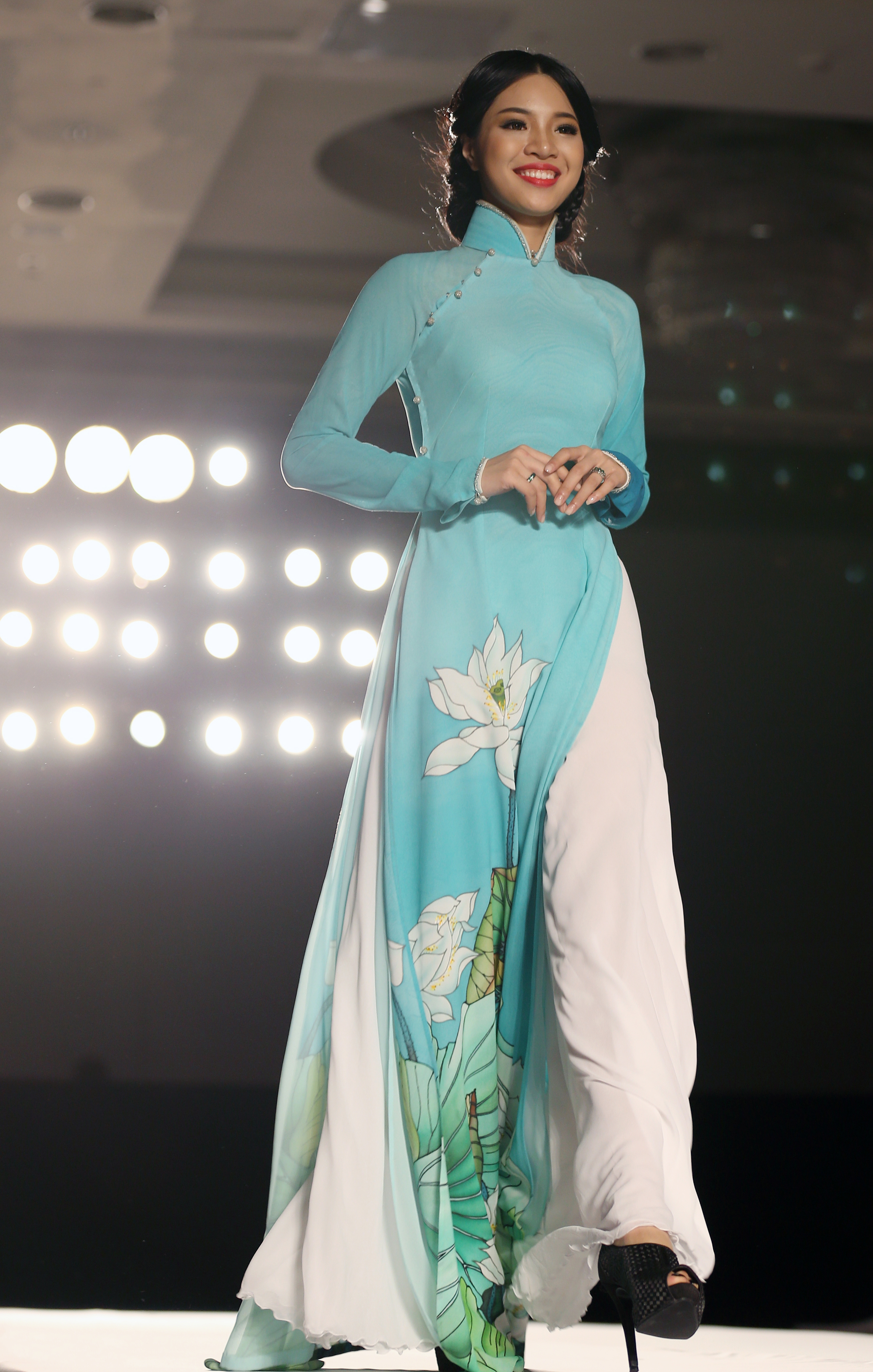
A woman wearing cyan áo dài

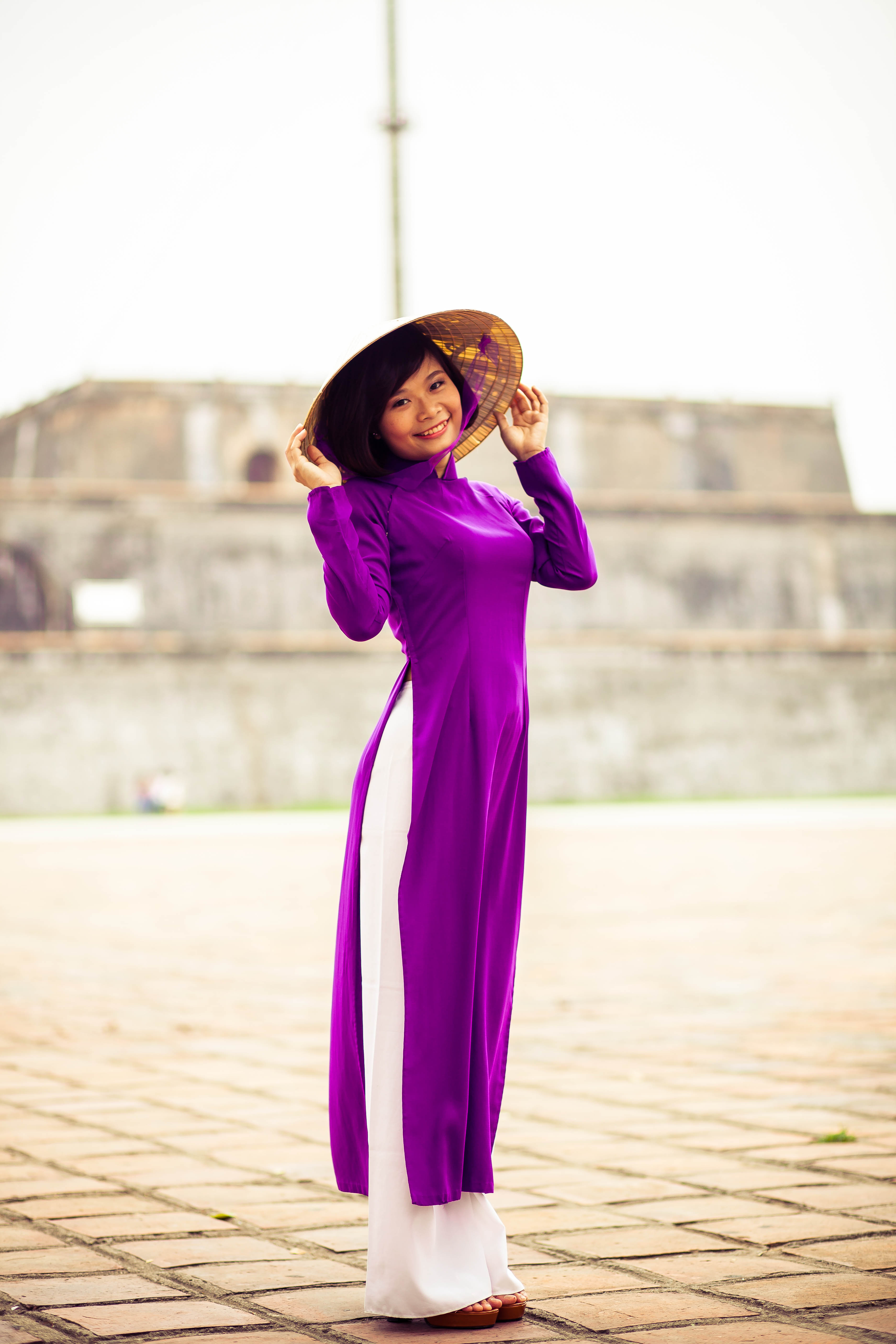
A woman wearing violet áo dài and nón lá

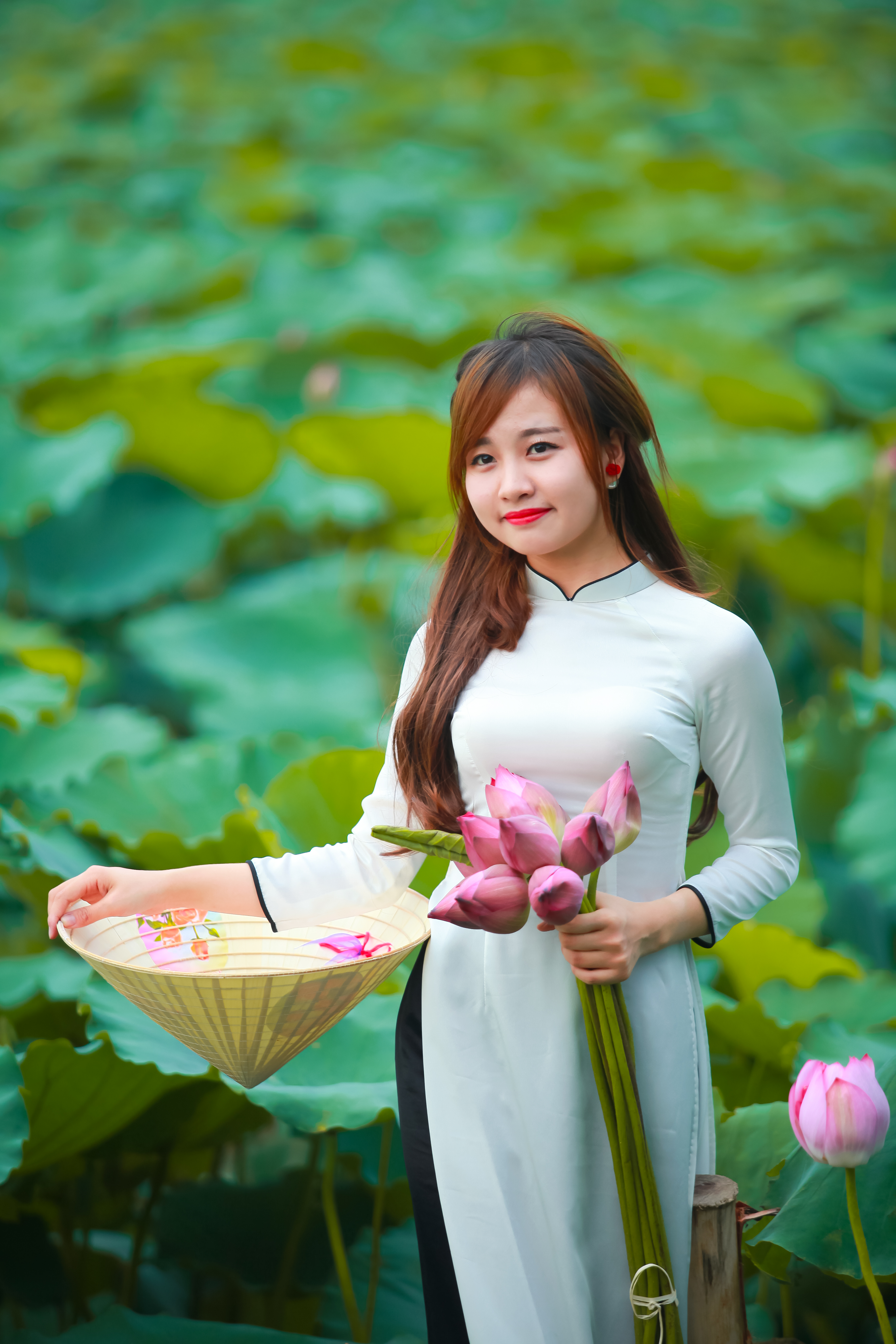
A young girl wearing white áo dài and holding Nón lá

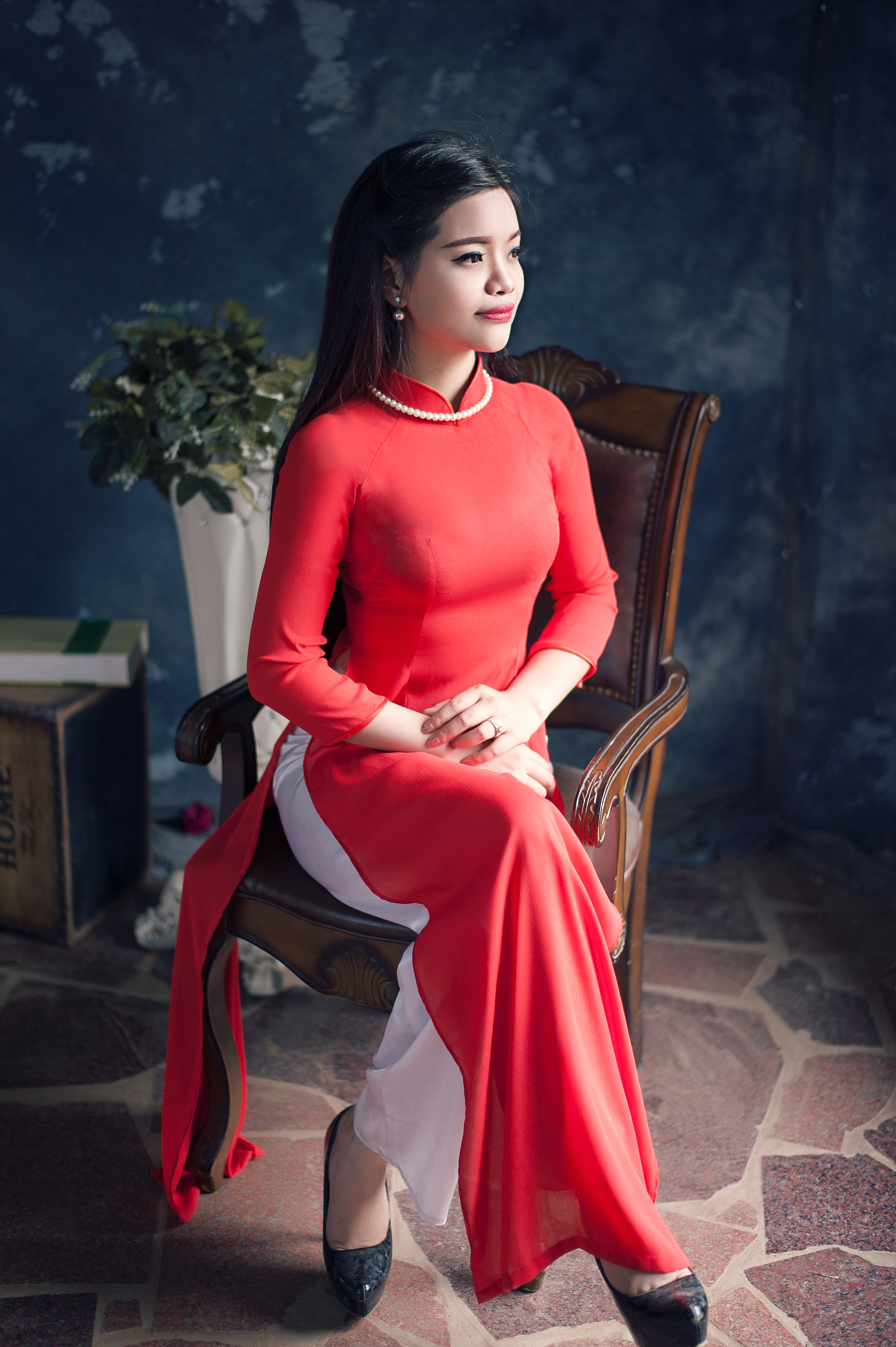
A woman wearing red áo dài

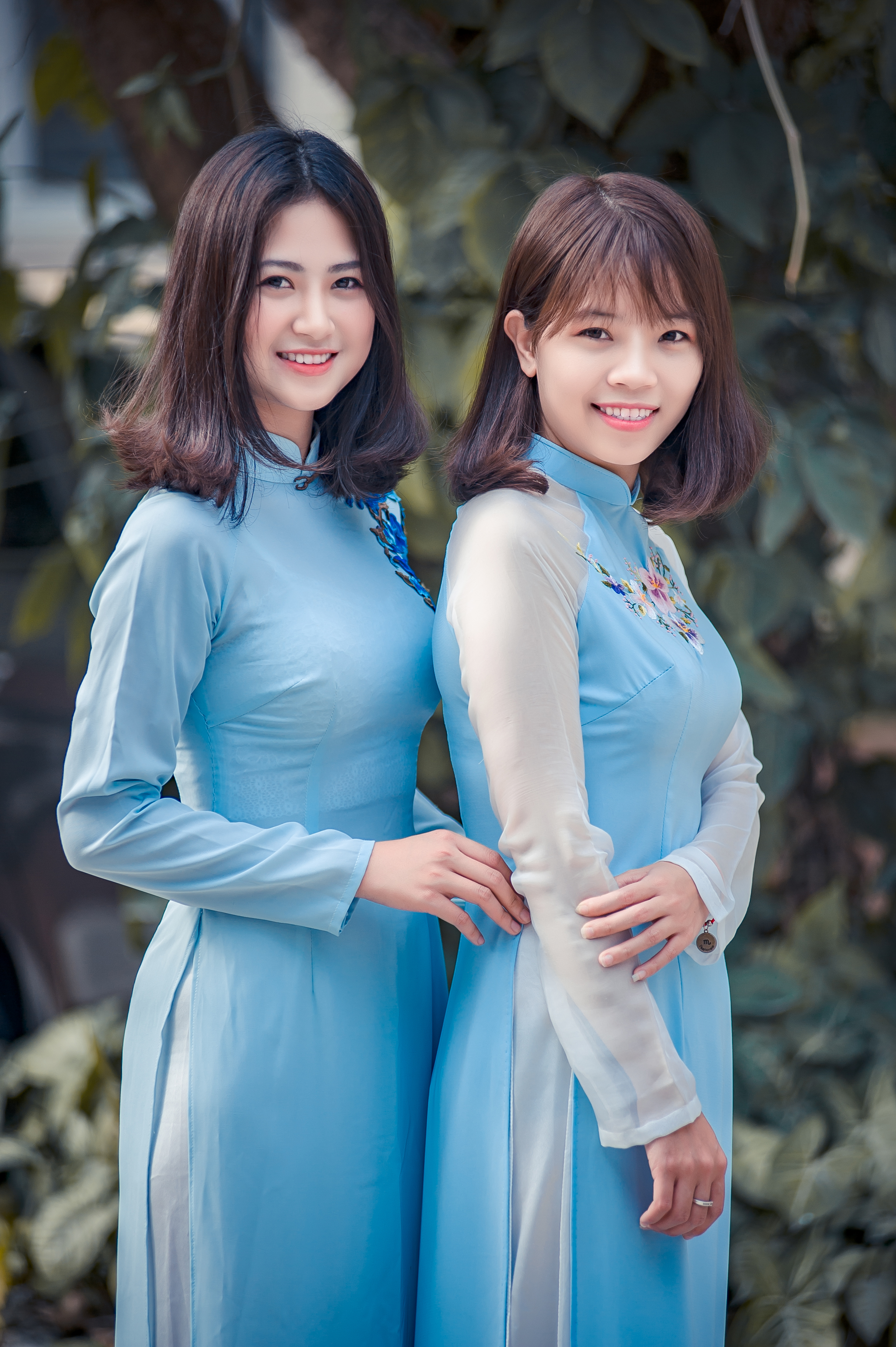
Two women wearing blue áo dài

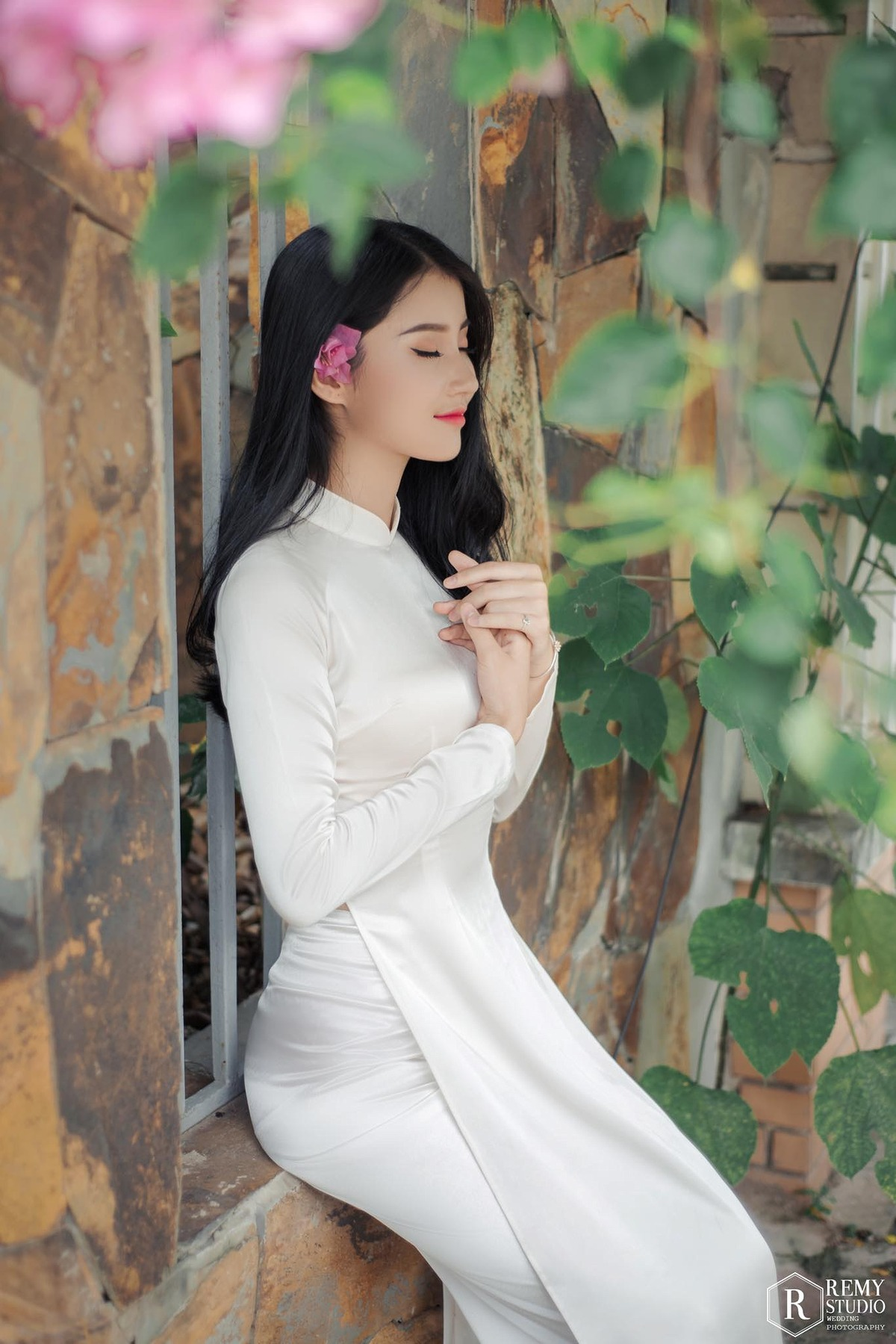
A girl wearing white áo dài

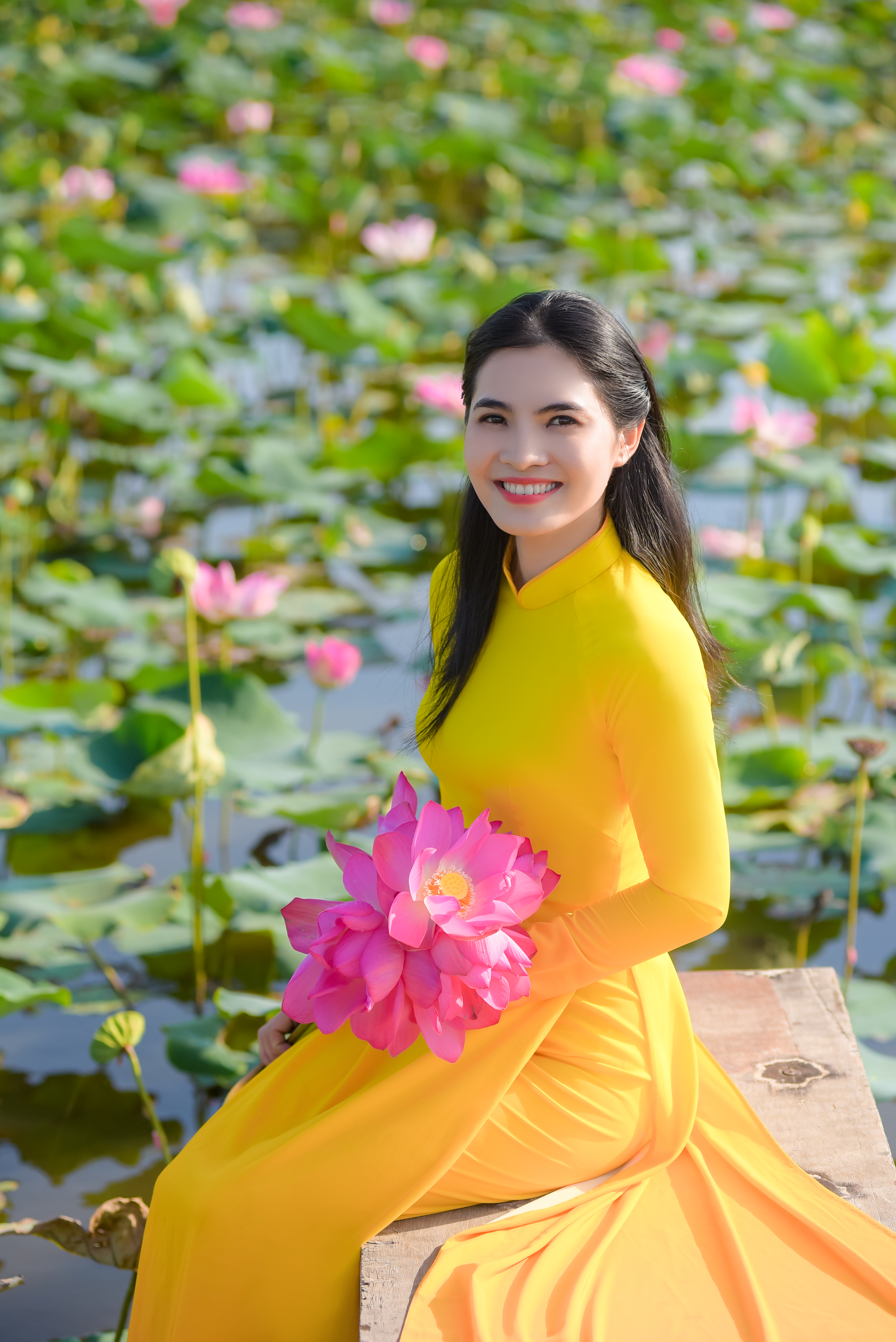
A woman wearing yellow áo dài

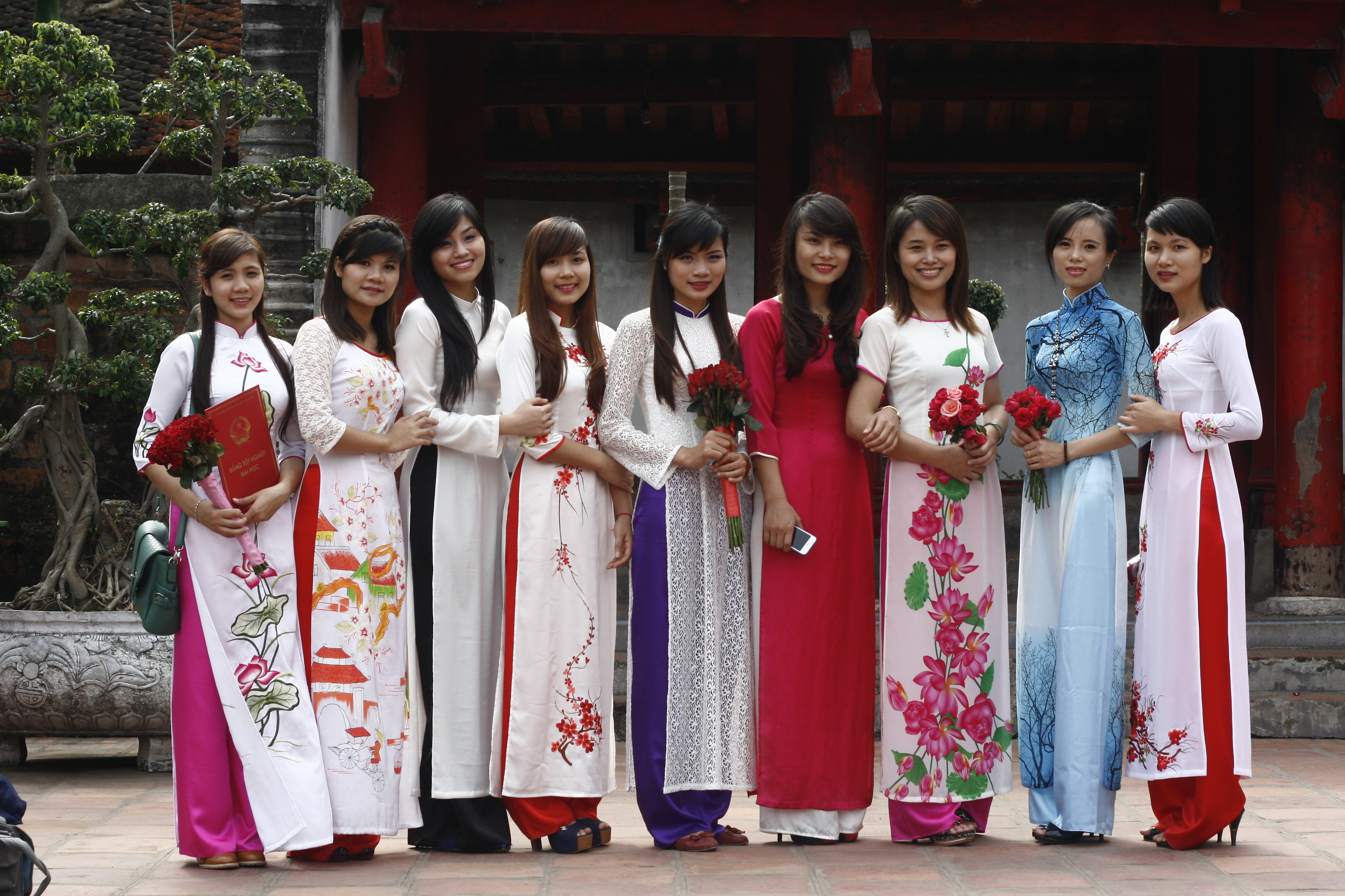
A group of women wearing áo dài with different color and pattern

== See also ==
- Áo giao lĩnh
- Ruqun
- Cheongsam
- Kurti top
- Shalwar kameez
- Việt phục
