= VVOB =

Belgian educational non-profit

- Formation: 1982
- Purpose: Education
- Headquarters: Brussels, Belgium
- Website: vvob.org

VVOB (education for development) is a non-profit organisation founded in 1982. Commissioned by the Flemish and Belgian governments, it contributes to the quality of education in developing countries.

The core of VVOB is technical assistance in projects and programmes carried out in co-management in countries in Africa, Asia and Latin America, funded by the Belgian and Flemish government.

The head office of VVOB is located in Brussels, Belgium. The organisation has operations in nine countries outside Belgium including Cambodia, Democratic Republic of the Congo, Ecuador, Rwanda, South Africa, Suriname, Uganda, Vietnam and Zambia.

In 2025, VVOB was one of several organizations affected by the Flemish development-aid budget cuts that ended government support for organizations working on development cooperation programs. Prior to the budget cuts, a €200,000 government subsidy had functioned as leverage funding, helping VVOB raise €11 million in donations.
