= Hocquard =

Hocquard is a surname. Notable people with the surname include:

- Charles-Édouard Hocquard (1853-1911), French doctor, explorer, photographer
- Emmanuel Hocquard (1940–2019), French poet
- Jean-Victor Hocquard (1910–1995), French musicologist and a specialist of Mozart
