= Ba tầm =

Traditional Vietnamese headwear

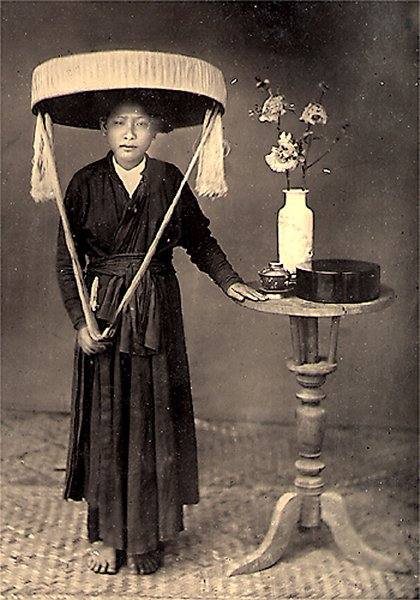
- Woman in an áo ngũ thân with nón Ba tầm.

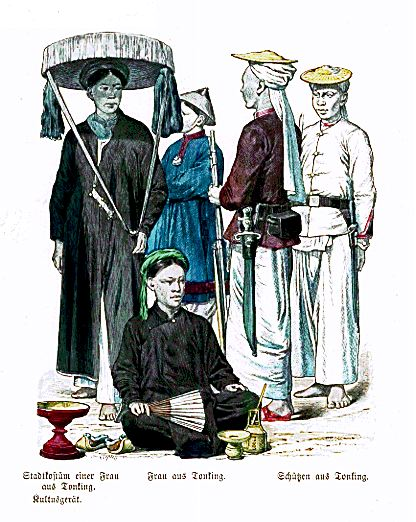
- Depiction of the people of Tonkin, a woman wearing a nón Ba tầm is shown.

Vietnamese name
- Vietnamese alphabet: nón Ba tầm
- Chữ Nôm: 𥶄𠀧尋
- Literal meaning: Three tầm hat

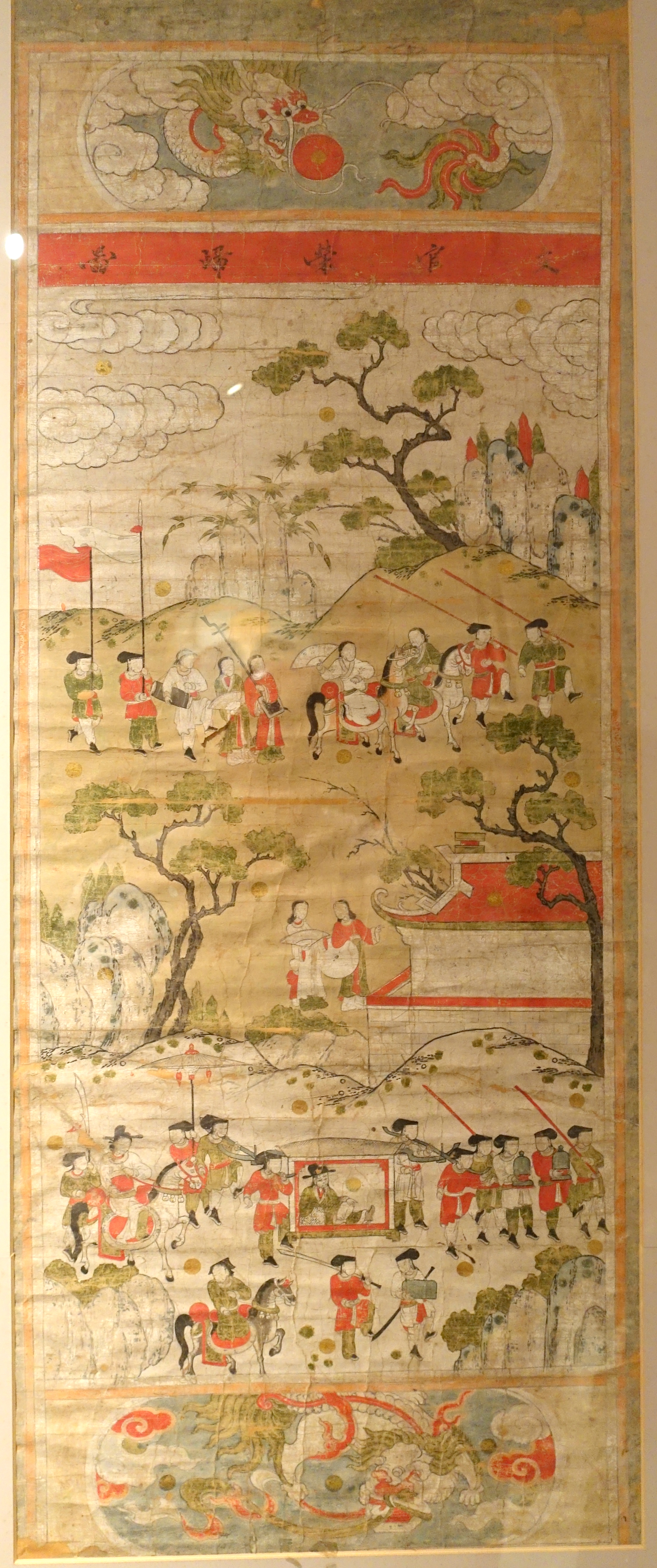
The painting Văn quan vinh quy đồ (文官榮歸圖) dated 18th century shows a woman wearing nón Ba tầm

A nón Ba tầm or nón quai thao is a traditional Vietnamese flat palm hat. It should be distinguished from other traditional Vietnamese headwear, such as the conical nón lá and the coiled turban (khăn vấn). The nón ba tầm is traditionally worn by Vietnamese women as an accessory to elegant garments, in contrast to the more practical clothing associated with farm work.

The hats traditionally worn by shamans featured silver ornaments hanging from silk strings attached around the brim.

== Origin of the hat ==
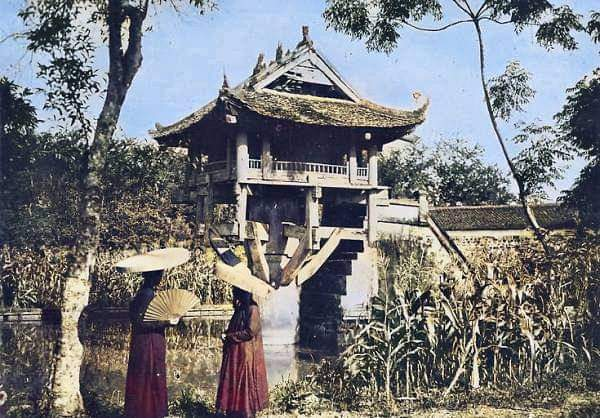
The woman on the left wears a Thúng hat and the woman on the right wears a Ba tầm hat

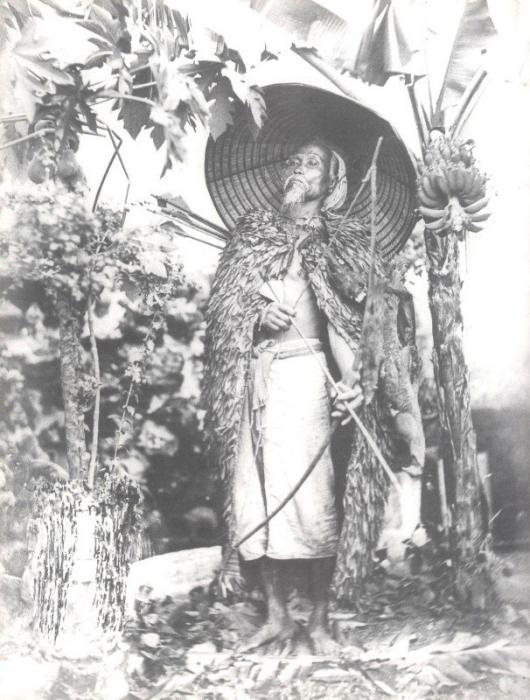
A hunter wearing a Ngoan xác lạp hat and Áo tơi

According to documents from the French at the end of the nineteenth century, ba tầm was translated into French as Le chapeau de trois tầm (literally "the hat of three tầm"). A tầm (尋) was an ancient unit of measurement used in China, Korea, Japan, and Vietnam, equivalent to an arm span. According to Vũ Trung Tùy Bút, the ba tầm hat is a combination of the styles of the dậu, mền giải, and viên cơ hats. The hat has been mentioned in literature since the 18th century, but its origin may be much older.

- Nón mền giải (also referred to as Ngoan Xác lạp 黿殼笠 and Tam Giang lạp 三江笠) was worn by the elderly during the Revival Lê dynasty but eventually fell out of fashion.
- Nón vỏ bứa (Also referred to as Toan Bì lạp, 酸皮笠) was worn by the poor. It is a simplified version of the nón mền giải, made smaller in size. During the Nguyễn dynasty, it was referred to in literature as Thủy Thủ Lạp (水手笠). (Note: During this time, most literature and official documents were written in Literary Chinese, thus the names using lạp 笠, the Chinese word for hat.)
- Nón dậu (Cổ châu lạp, 古洲笠) was worn by elderly relatives of mandarins, middle-class men and women, scholars, and commoners in the capital. The hat had a pointed top, a flat rim, and a few beams of thao thread, a type of silk.
- Viên cơ lạp (圓箕笠) originated in Hoan Châu province (modern-day Nghệ An province). During the Revival Lê dynasty, it was worn by soldiers during the Arrogant Soldiers Rebellion (Loạn Kiêu Binh). This hat featured a long design resembling a winnowing basket (nia). During the Nguyễn dynasty, it was redesigned as a smaller hat, similar to the nón thúng but with a square bevel. A smaller version of the nón Ba tầm, called a nón Nghệ (referred to in French as Le chapeau de Nghệ-an), was typically worn by women.
- Nón thúng (Chapeau en forme de panier) was worn by both men and women. It featured a broader, bronze-tapered design compared to the nón Nghệ.

== Construction of the hat ==
Ba tầm hats are covered with palm leaves or gồi leaves and are shaped like a parasol or mushroom. They have a flat top, with a cone diameter of about 70–80 cm and a brim that is 10–12 cm high or more. The inside of the hat is reinforced with a funnel-shaped rim called a khua or khùa (摳) to help secure it on the user's head. Additionally, colorful thao threads are often tied to the brim of the hat as a decorative charm.

The term nón quai thao is often used to refer to a nón ba tầm. This association stems from an improved design by writer Kim Lân and his son, making the hat more compact and suitable for artistic performances. This modified version was later adopted by female Quan họ singers, which contributed to its increased popularity.

== Gallery ==
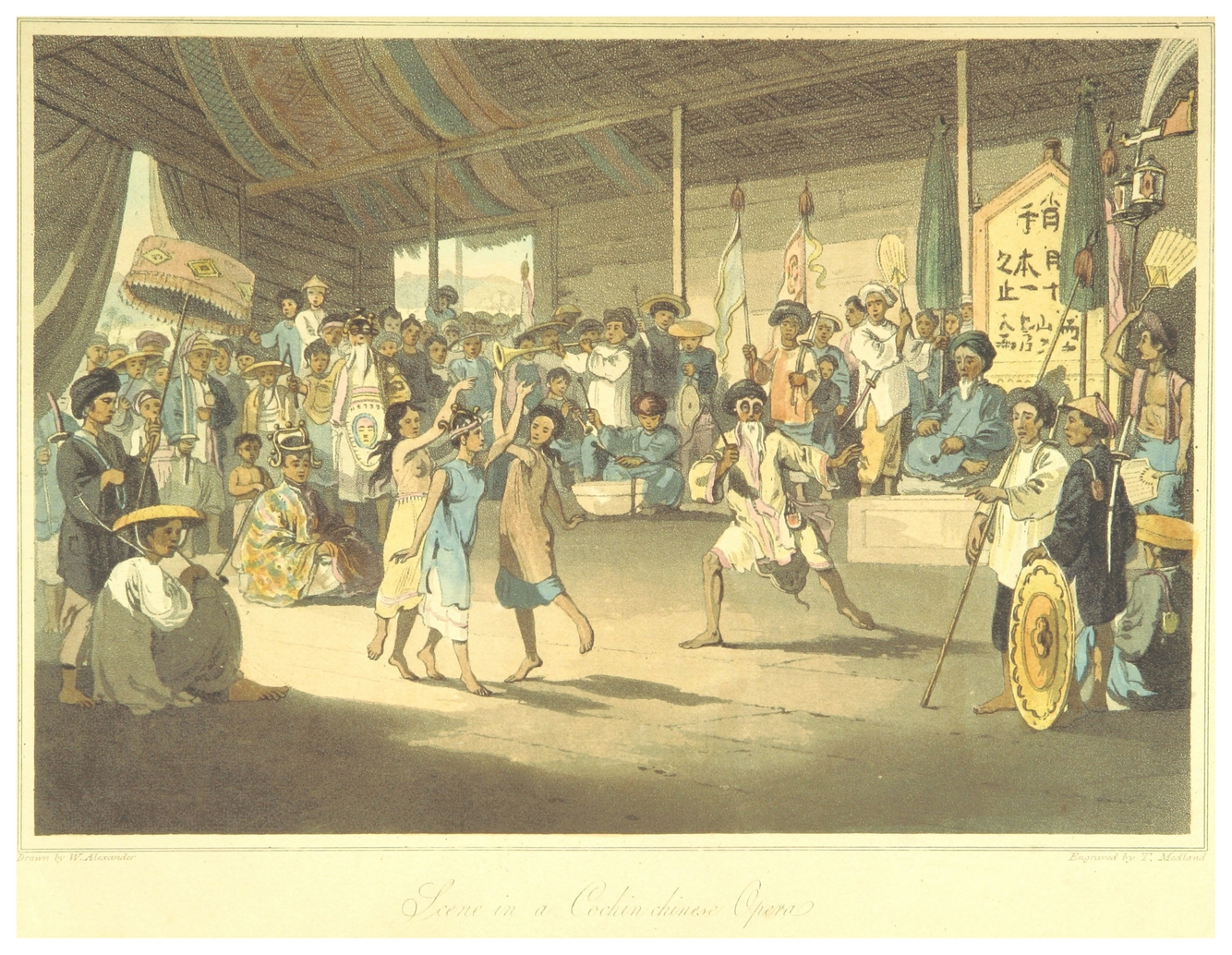
Men and women wearing Nghệ hats at a nhà trò (performing arts centre) in Quảng Nam, 1793

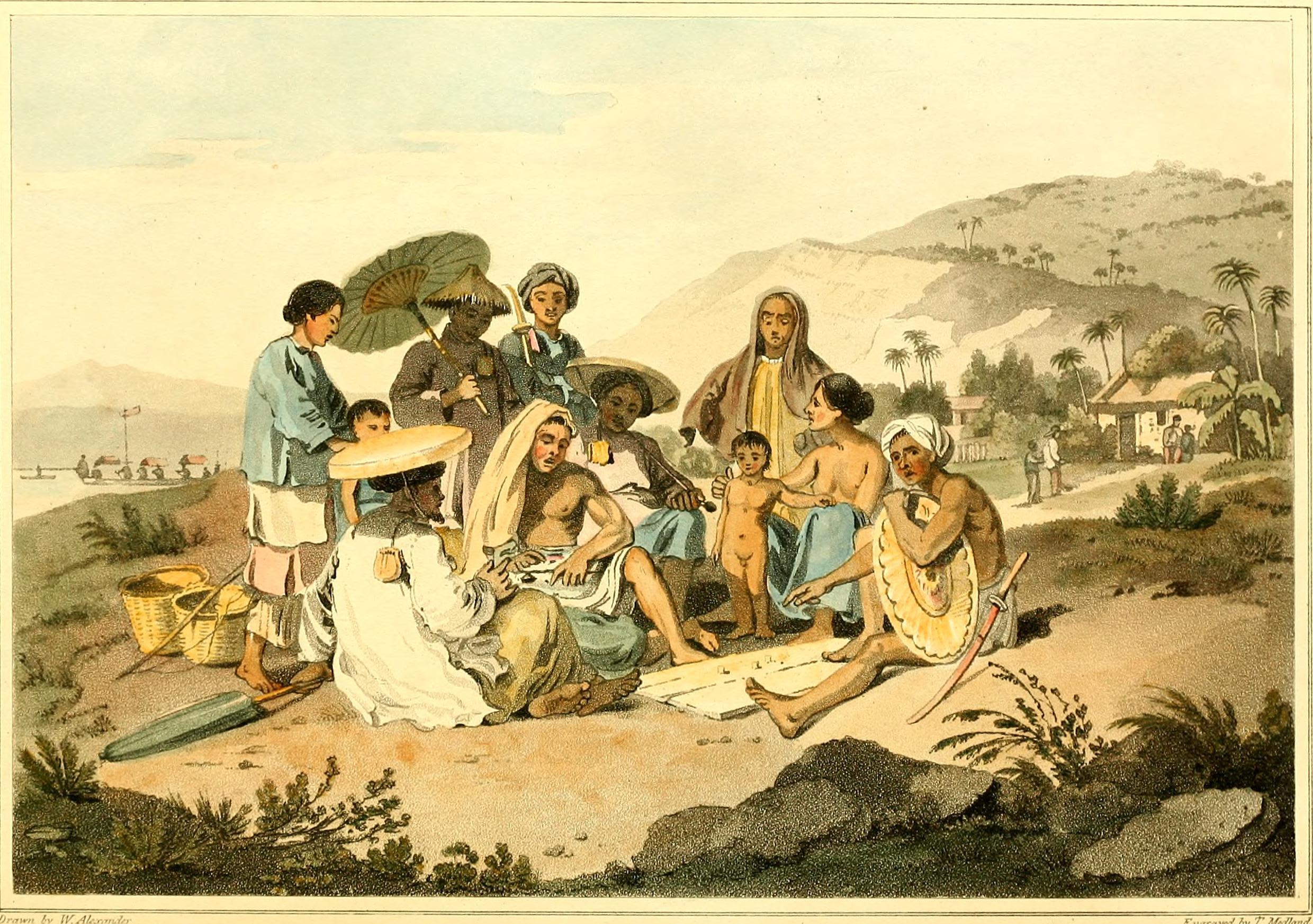
Men and women wearing Nghệ hats at a beach in Danang, 1793

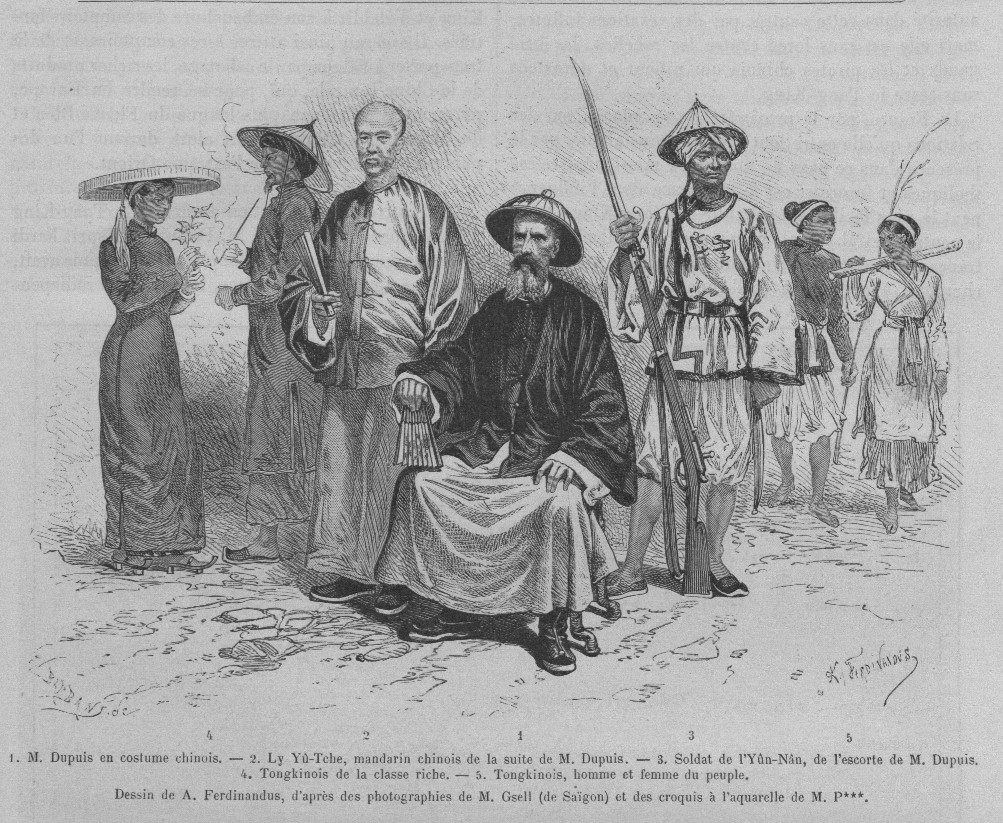
Woman wearing Nghệ hats during explorer Jean Dupuis' voyage.

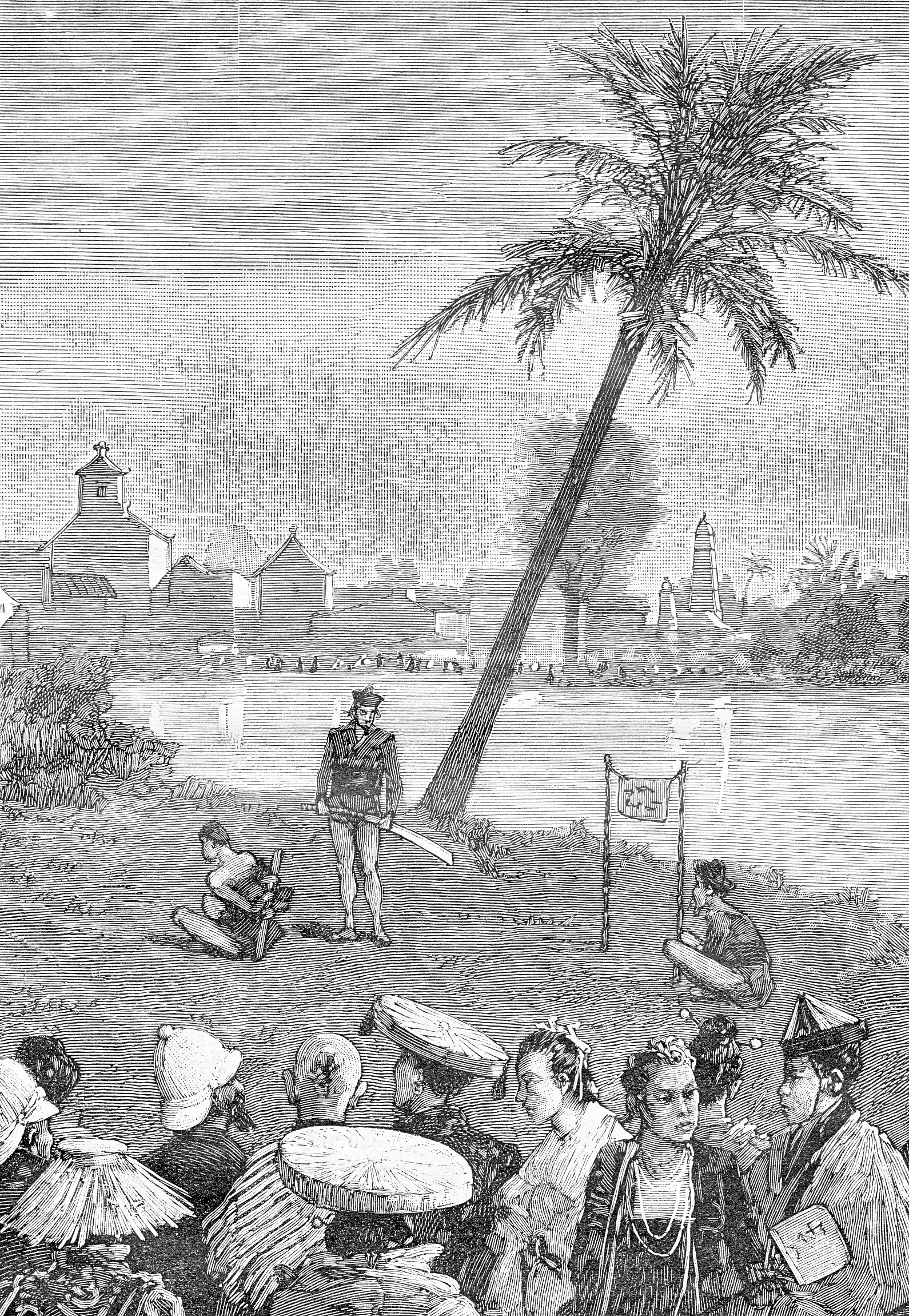
Women wearing nón Ba tầm watch the execution of a pirate chief by the Hoàn Kiếm Lake, 1886

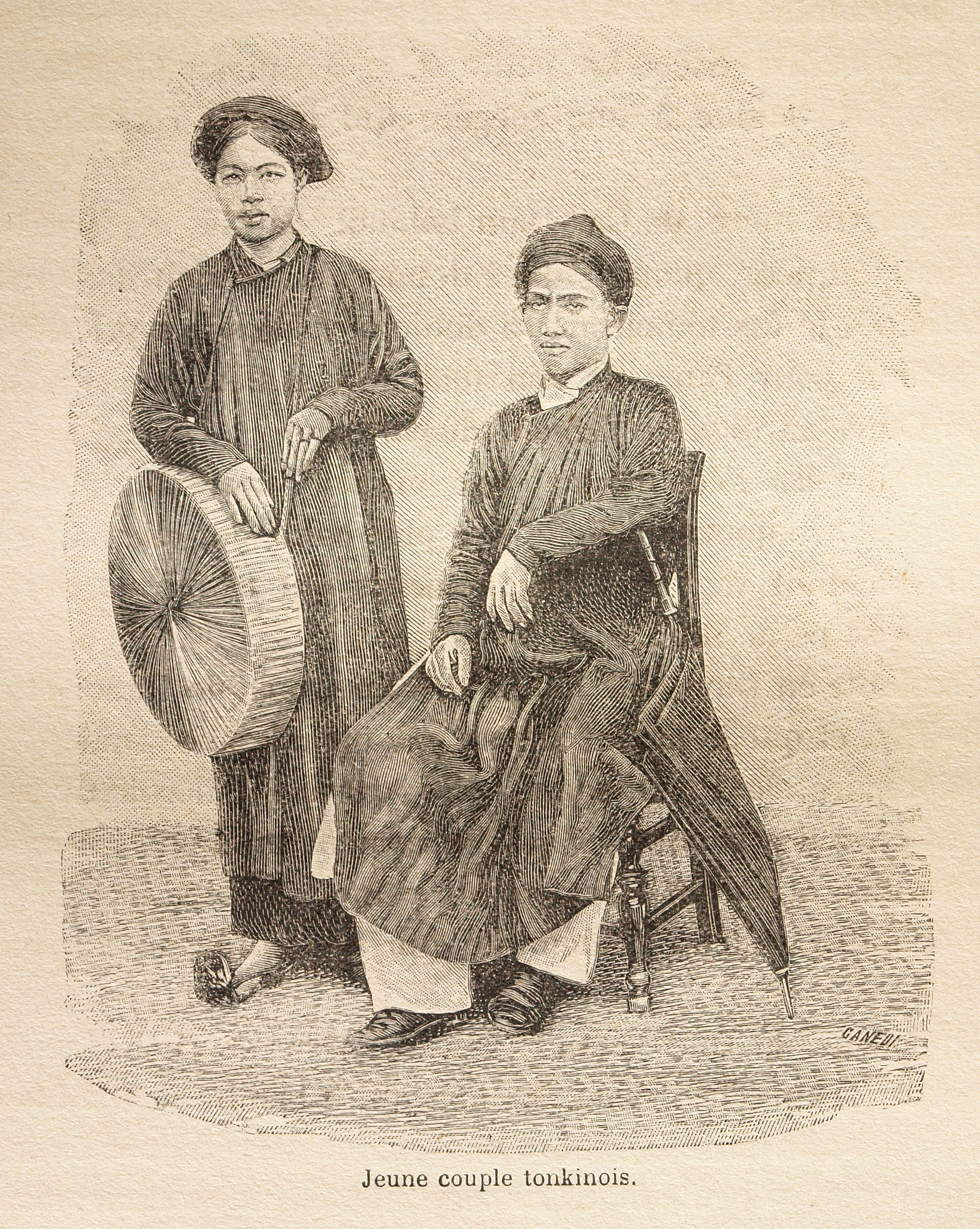
Sketch of a Tonkinese wearing nón Ba tầm, 1899
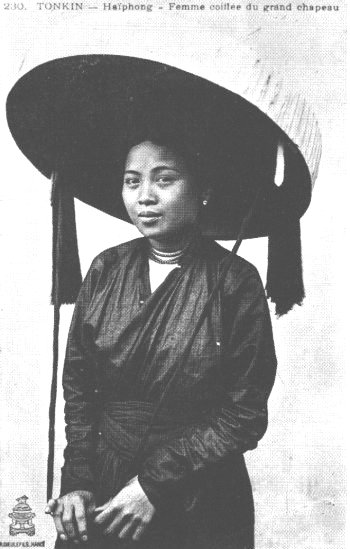
A Tonkin girl wearing nón Ba tầm.

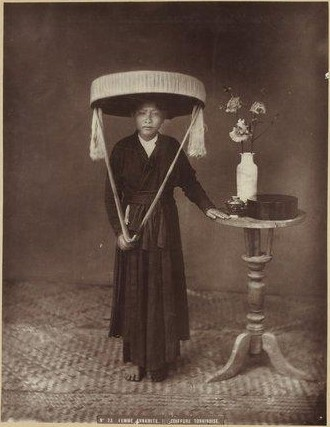
A Tonkinese girl wearing nón Ba tầm, photographed by Charles-Édouard Hocquard in Hanoi, 1885

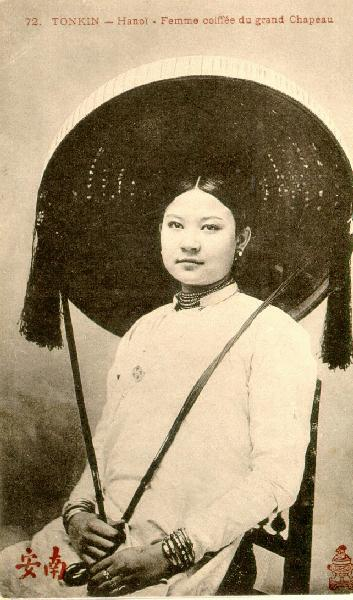
Vương Thị Phượng wears a nón Ba tầm in photo taken in the early 20th century.

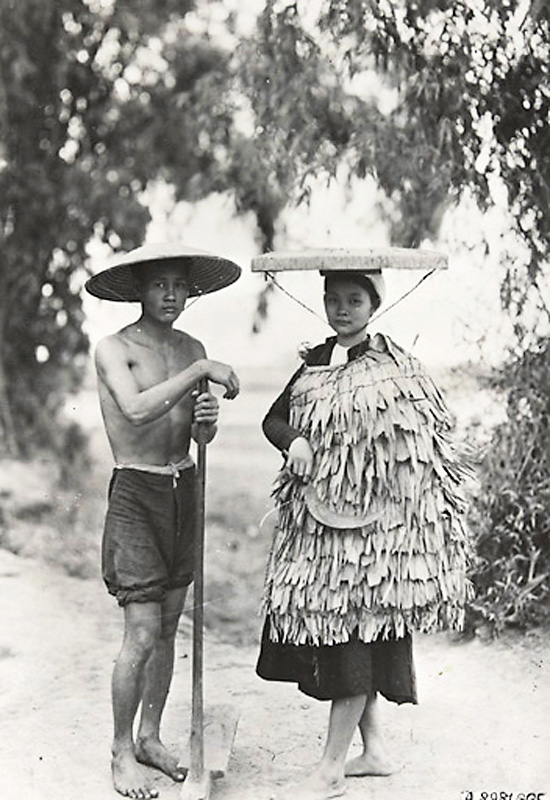
Two farmers Tonkin wearing thúng hats, 1919

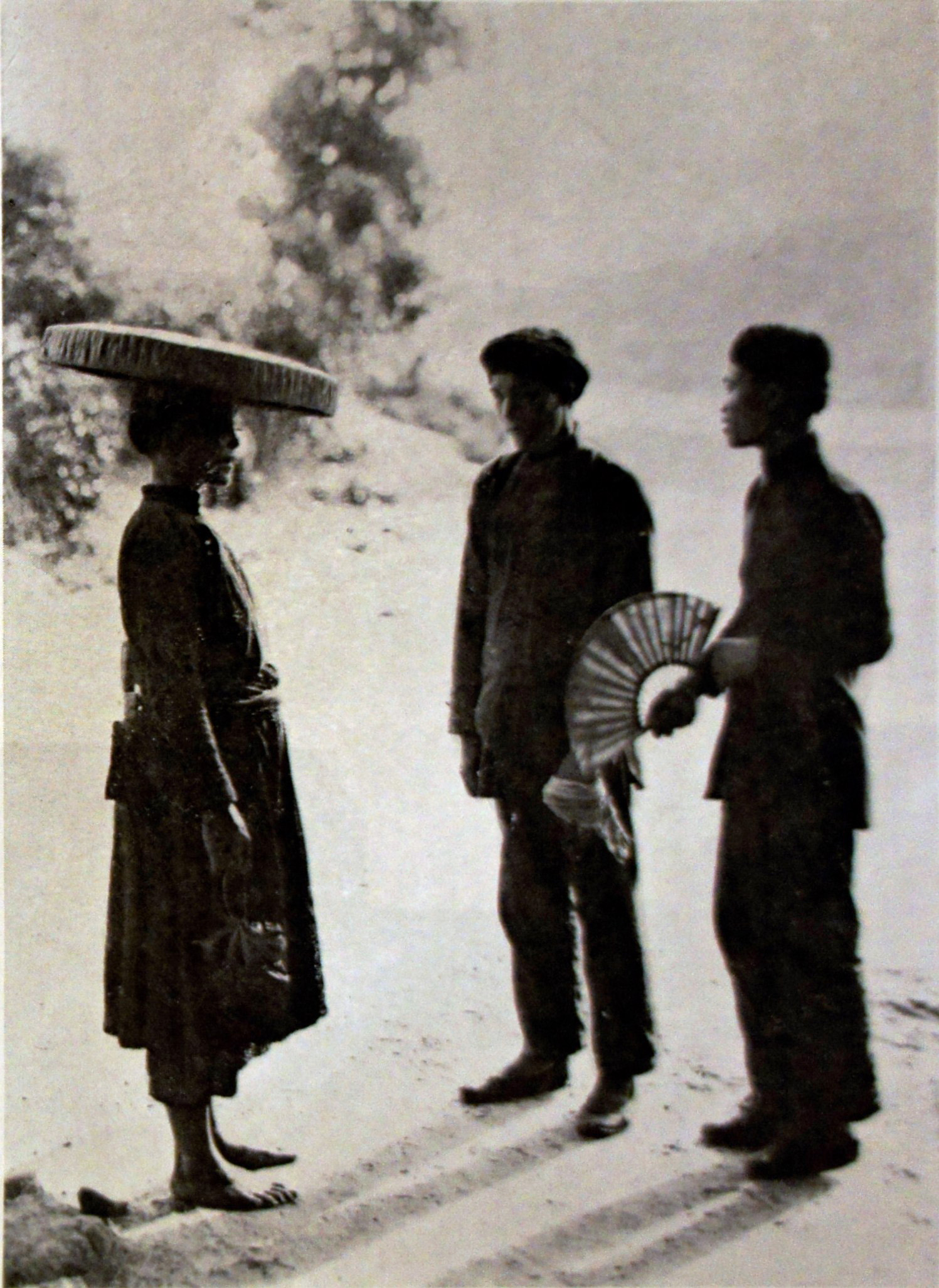
Tày woman wearing a thúng hat, 1931

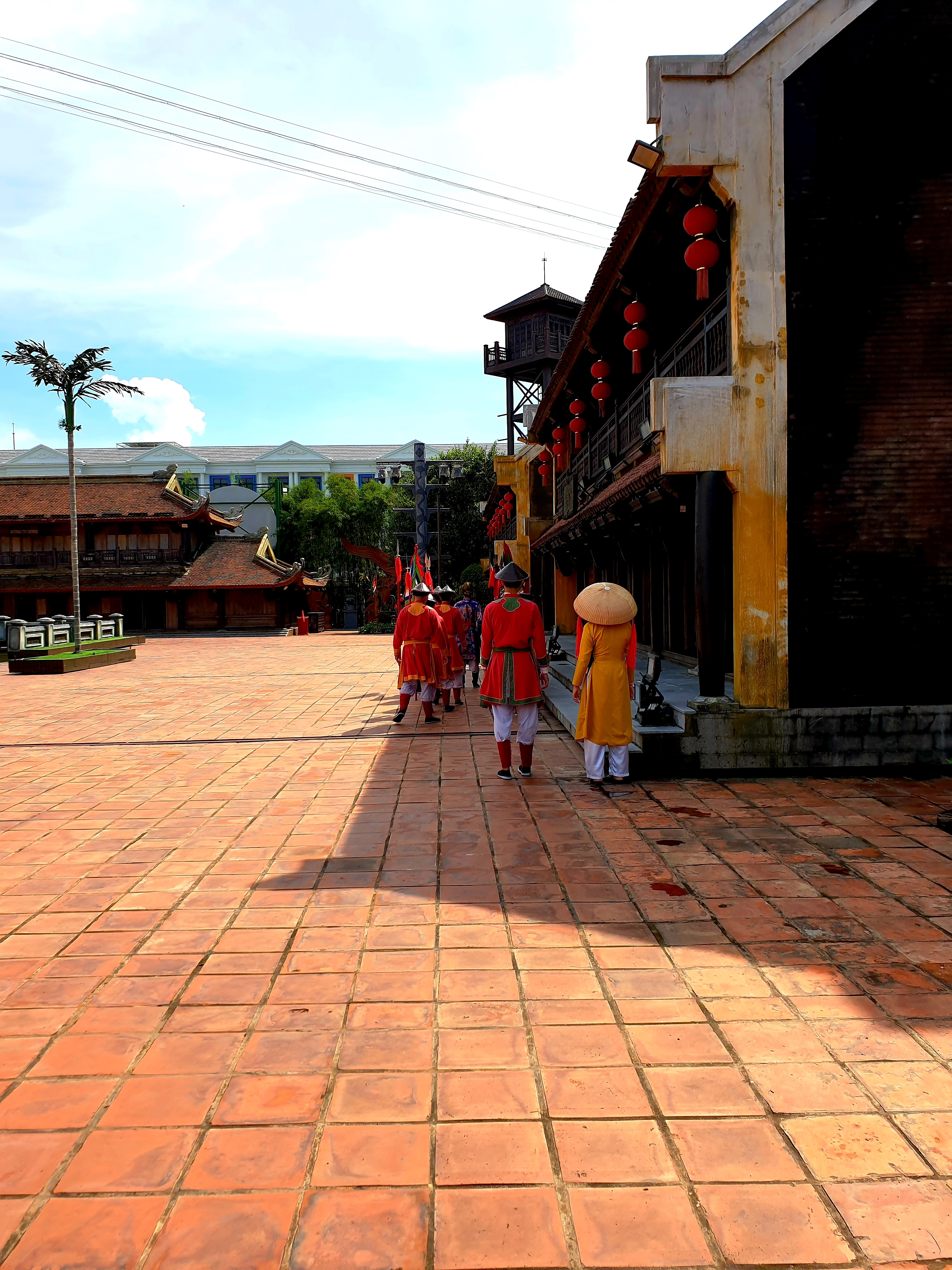
A girl wearing Áo ngũ thân and a Lòng chảo hat in Thăng Long Cổ trấn
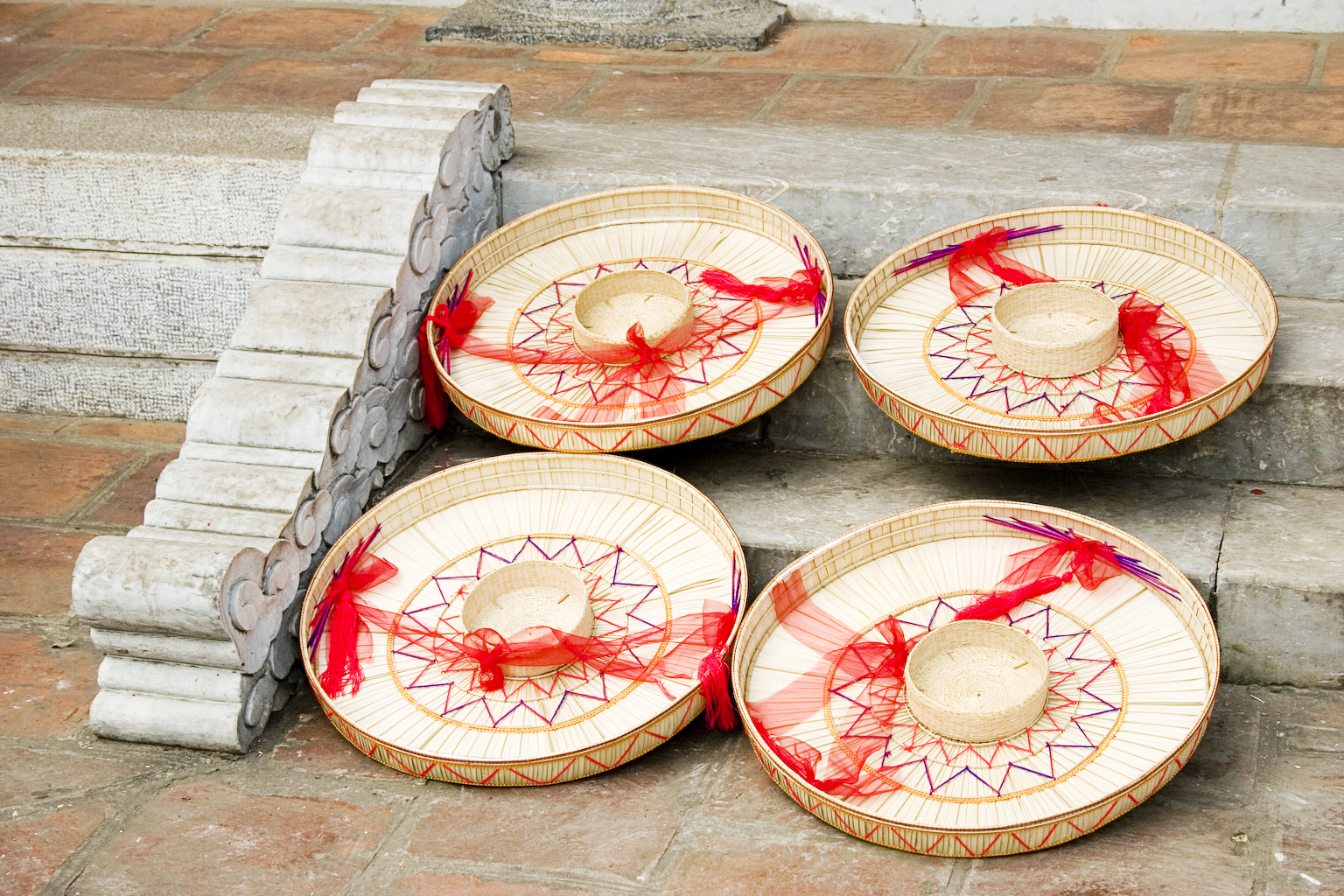
Picture of nón quai thao.

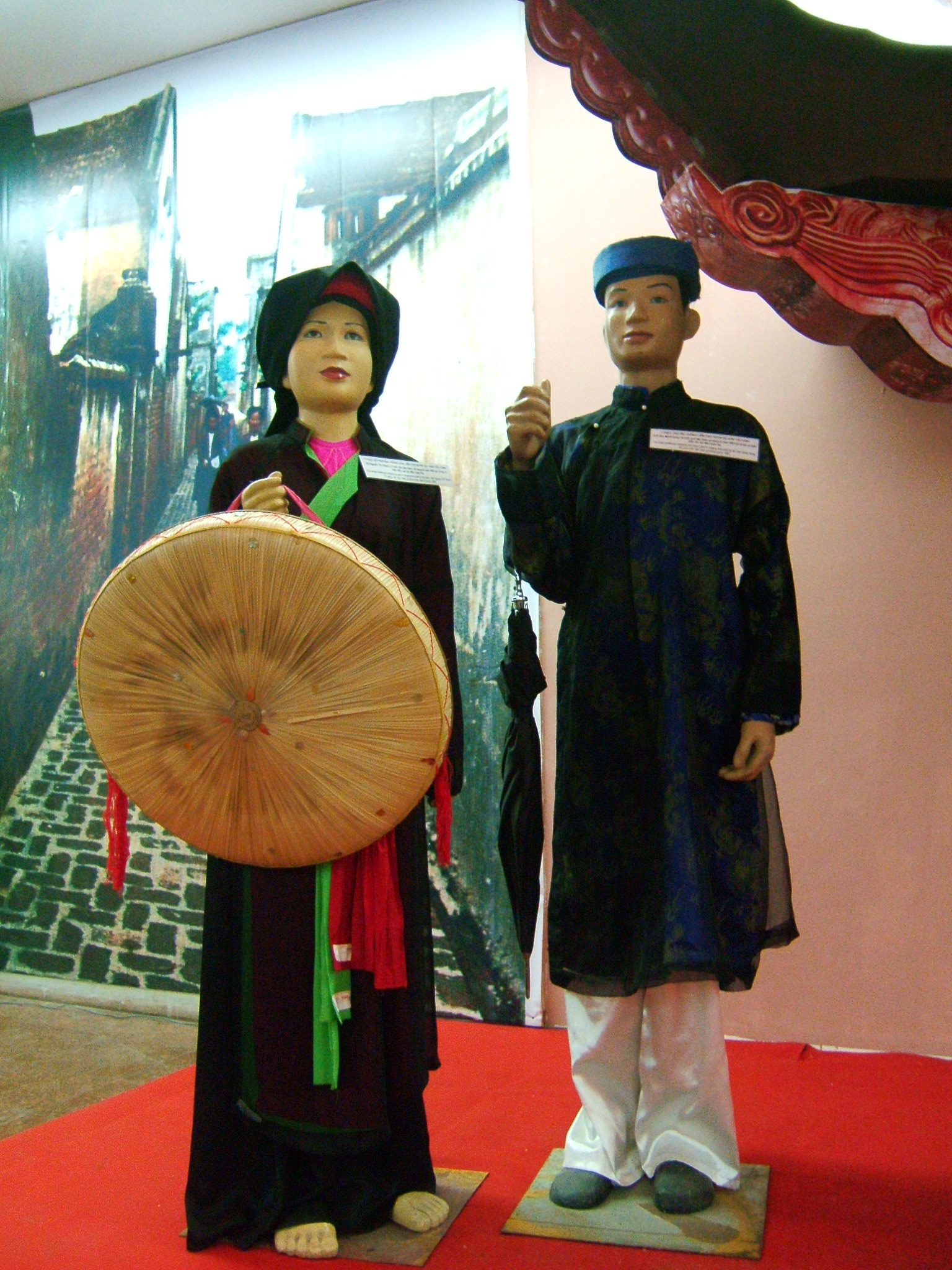
Nón quai thao with traditional male and female dresses for Quan họ.

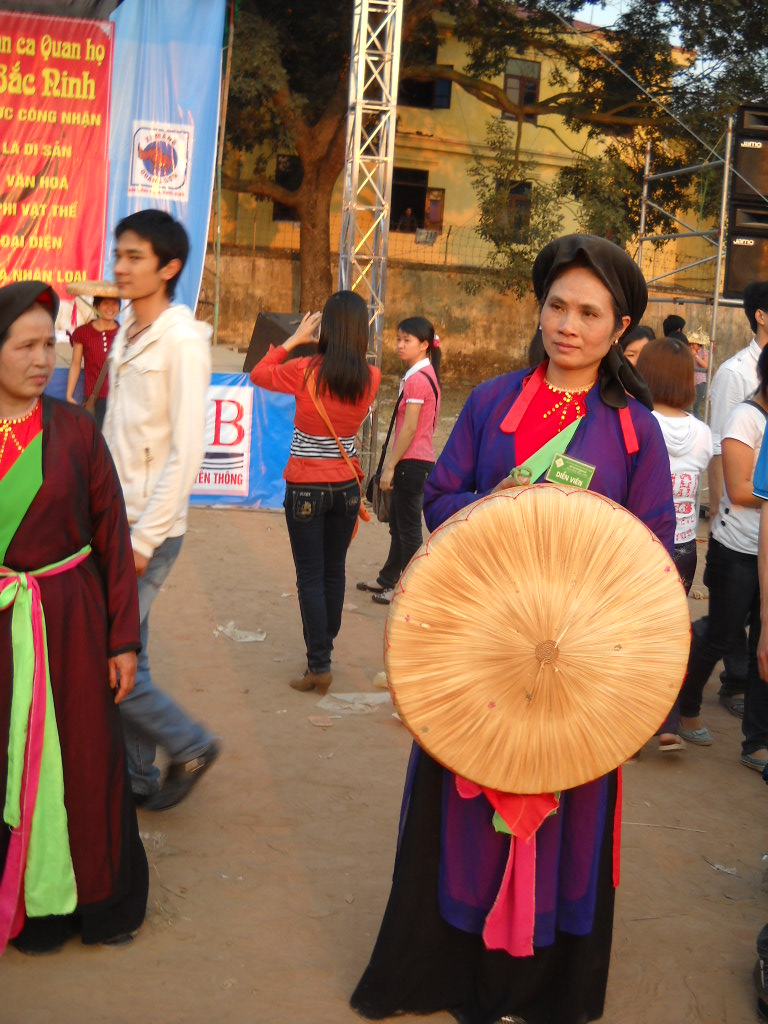
A Quan họ female artist holding a nón quai thao at Lim festival, 2010

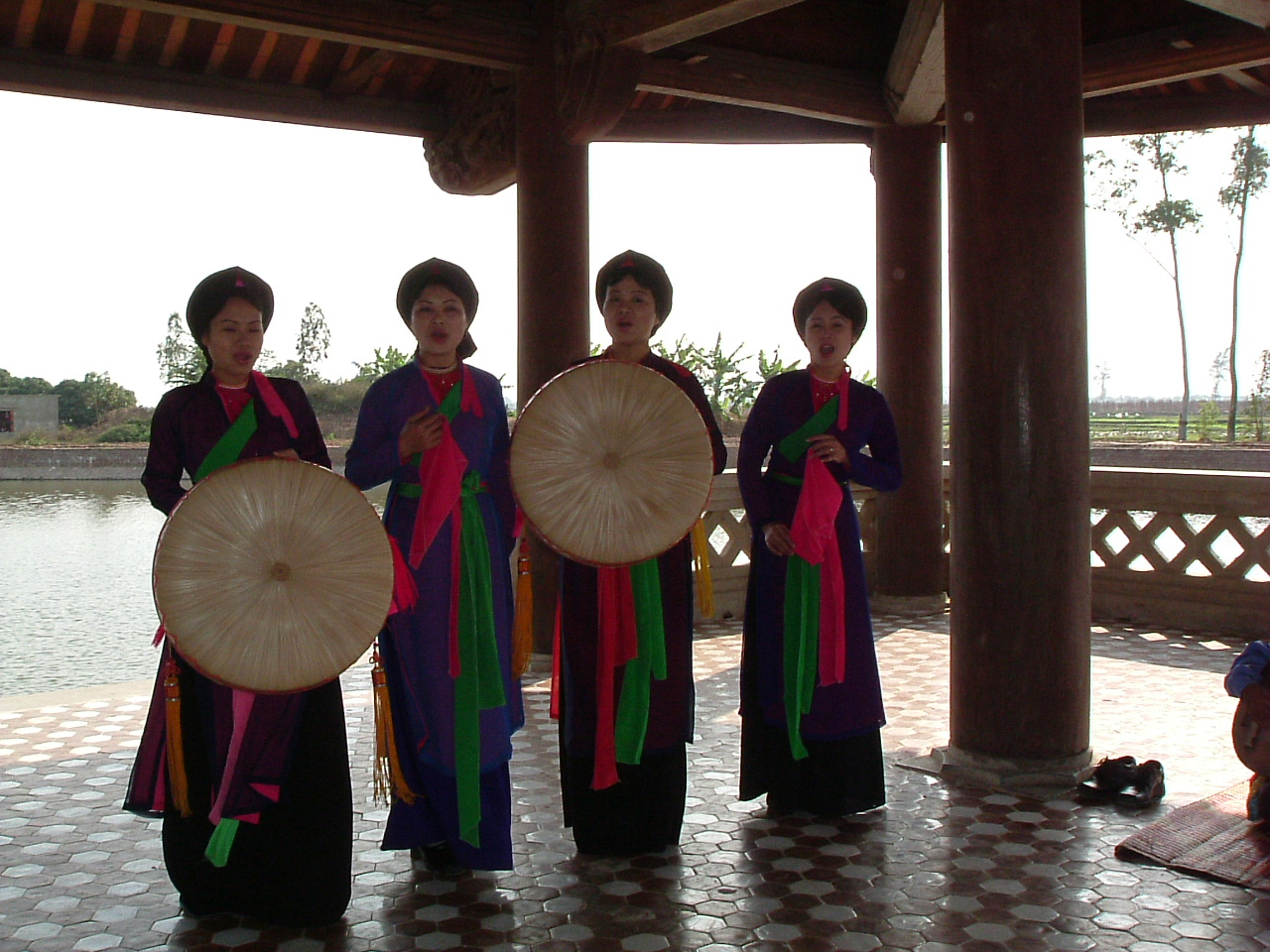
A Quan họ ensemble holding quai thao hats duiring a performance at Đô temple, 2014

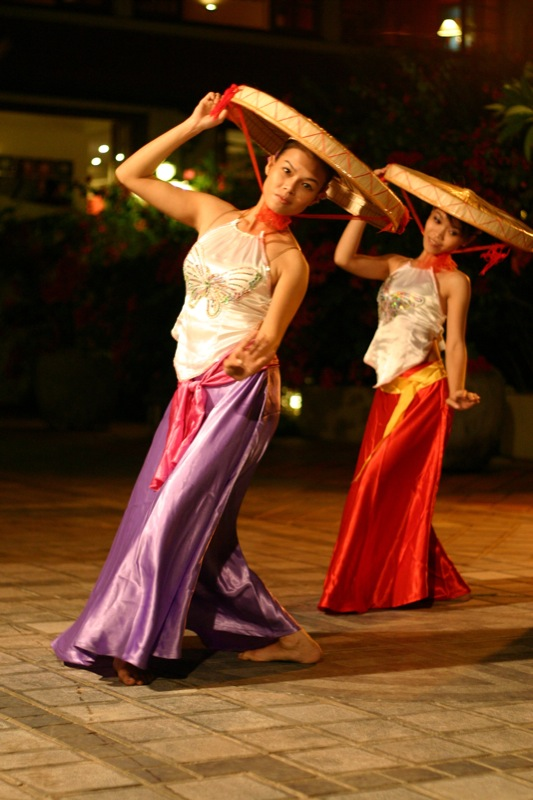
Dancers perform with quai thao hats.

== See also ==
- List of hat styles
- Nón lá
- Đinh Tự
- Phốc Đầu
- Vietnamese clothing
