= Kim Bác Sơn =

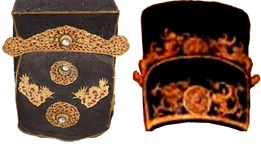
19th century gilded Kim Bác Sơn

Kim Bác Sơn is a small gilded metal ornament to decorate the caps of kings, queens, officials, and nobles in the Nguyễn dynasty. It is thought to first appear in the late Lê dynasty.

== Images ==
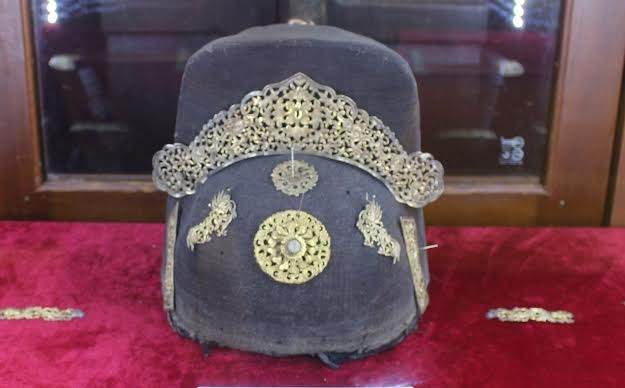
19th century Phốc Đầu with Kim Bác Sơn.
