= Nón lá =

Traditional Vietnamese headwear

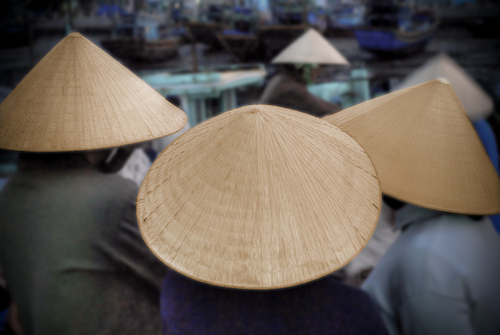
- Popular headgear of Vietnamese people

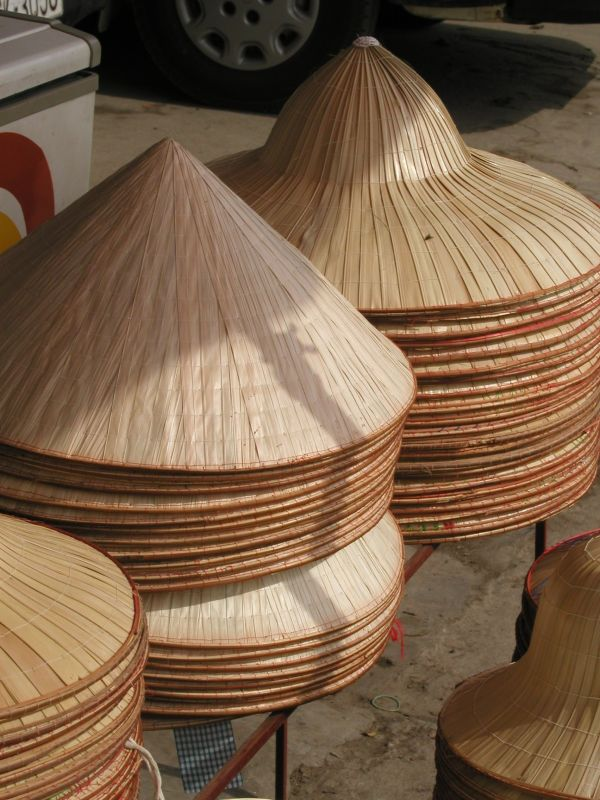
- The two most popular nón lá designs today

Vietnamese name
- Vietnamese alphabet: Nón lá
- Chữ Nôm: 𥶄蘿

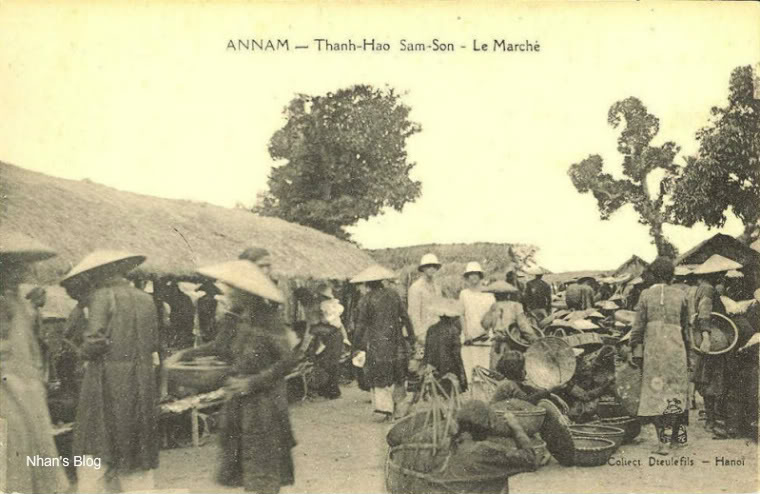
Nón lá at Sầm Sơn market in 1905

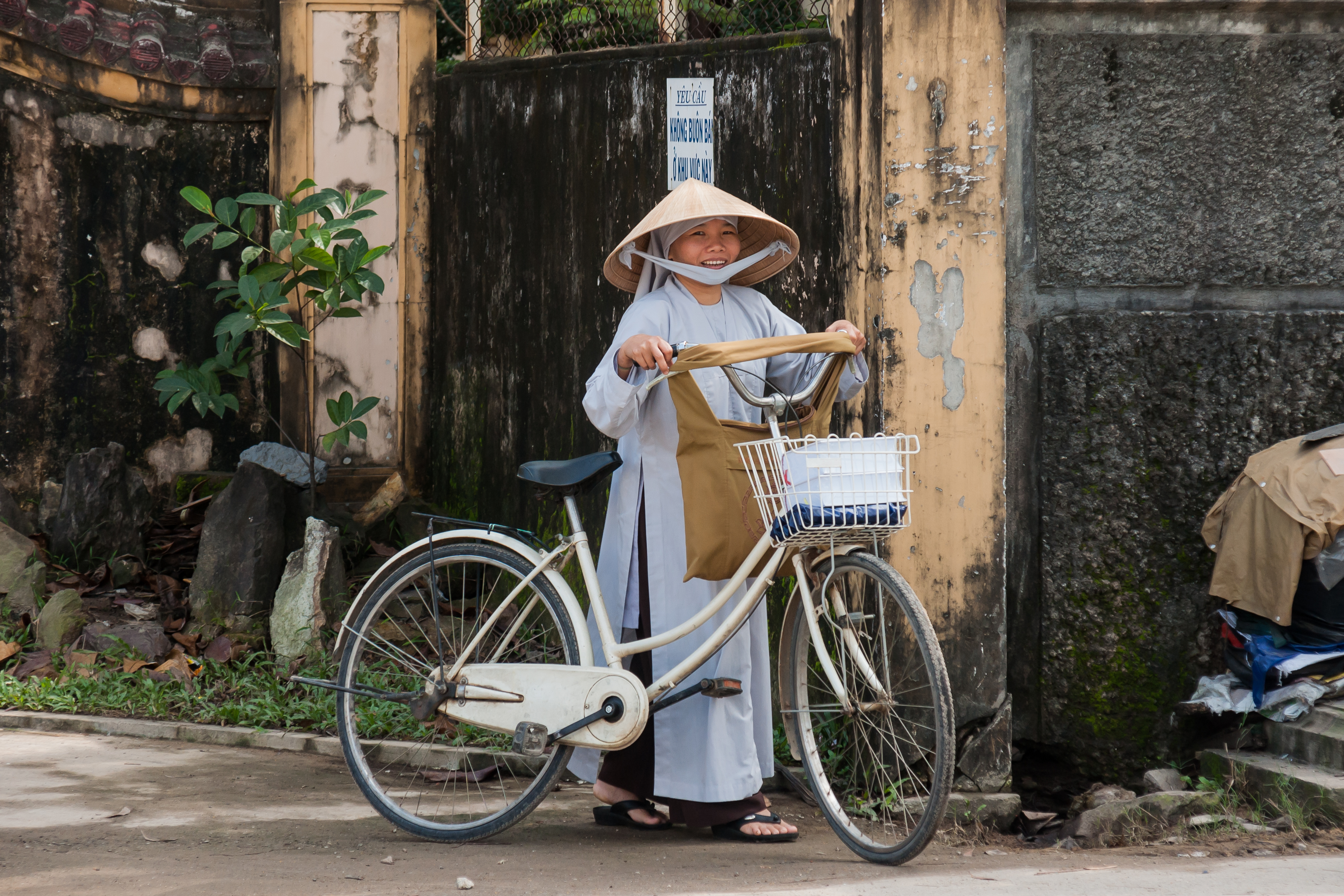
A bhikkhunī in Huế is wearing a nón lá and riding a bicycle

Nón lá (chữ Nôm: 𥶄蘿; lit. 'leaf hat') or nón tơi (𥶄𥵖) is a type of Vietnamese headwear used to shield the face from the sun and rain. It is a common name for many types of hats in Vietnam, but now it is mainly used to refer to cones with pointed tips.

The hats have been worn since ancient times to protect the wearer from the sunshine and rain of Vietnam's tropical monsoon climate. Although conical bamboo hats are often stereotypically portrayed as synonymous with Vietnam, they are found across many Asian societies and are often associated with rice-farming peasantries. It was independently created and adapted by peasants of rice farming cultures across thousands of miles since it is the ultimate tool for surviving long hours in fields flooded with water.

In Vietnam today, there are a number of traditional hat-making villages, including Đồng Di (Phú Vang), Dạ Lê (Hương Thủy), Trường Giang (Nông Cống), Phủ Cam (Huế), and Chuông (Thanh Oai, Hanoi).

== Characteristics ==
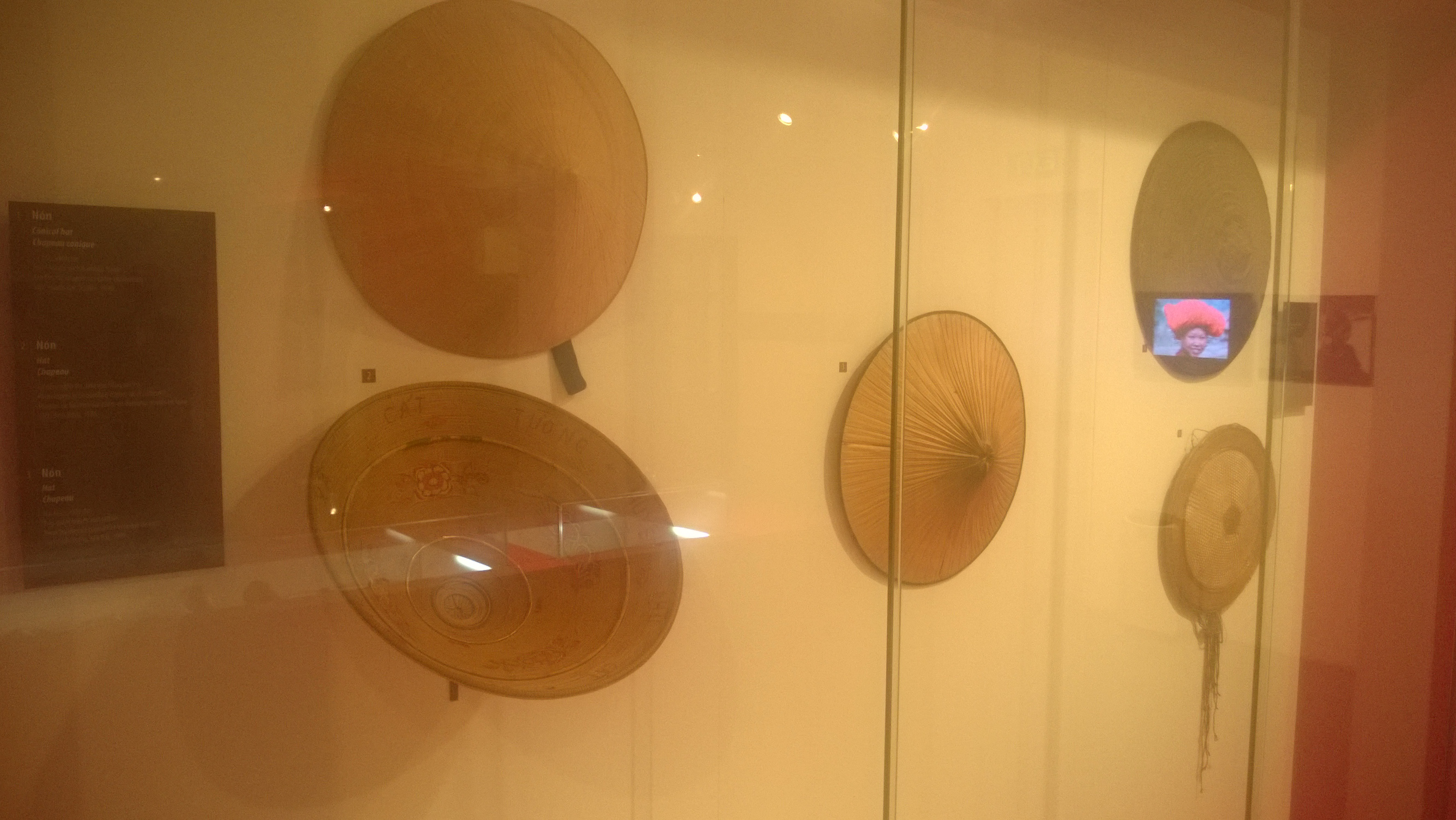
Some types of nón lá

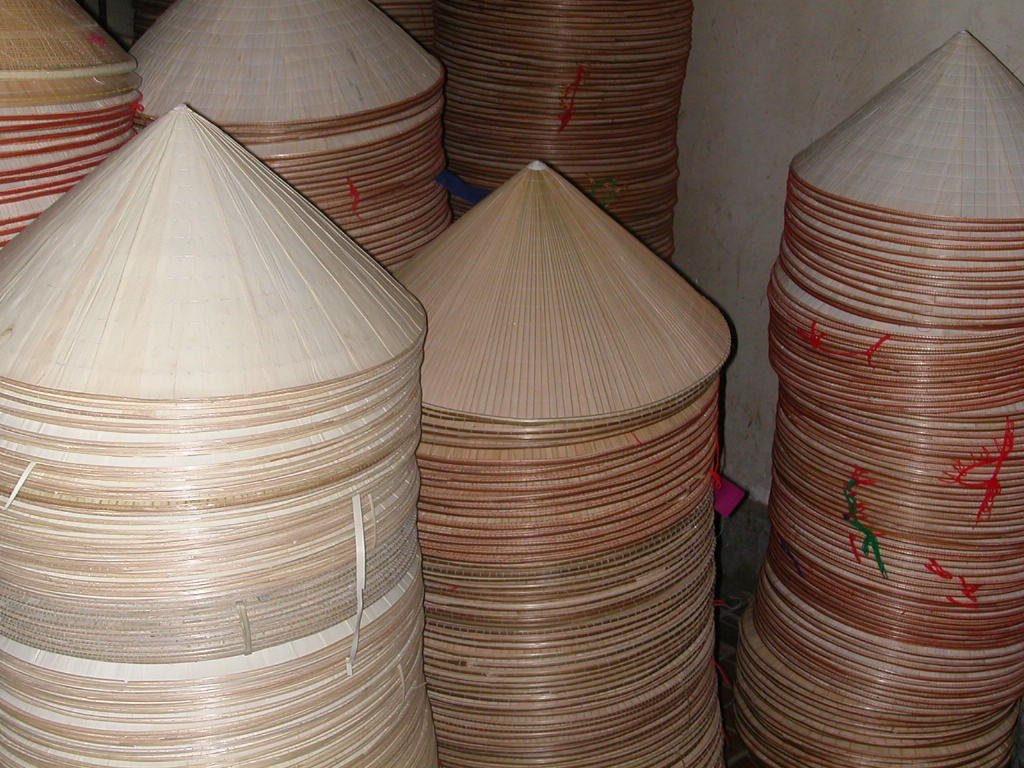
A stall selling Nón lá in Hanoi

Nón lá are typically woven with different types of leaves such as palm leaves, straw, bamboo, mortar leaves, hồ leaves, pandan leaves, and du quy diệp leaves.

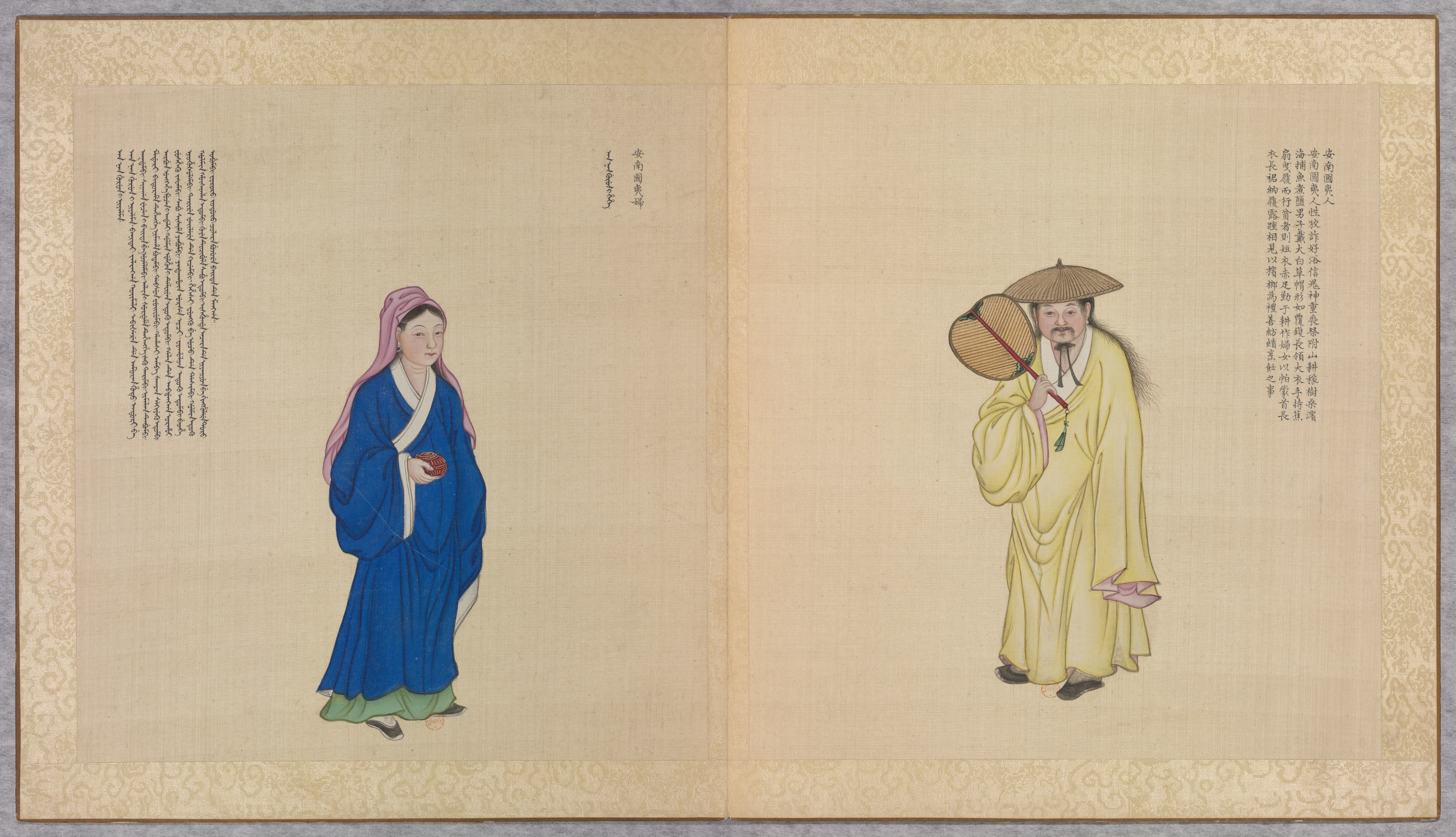
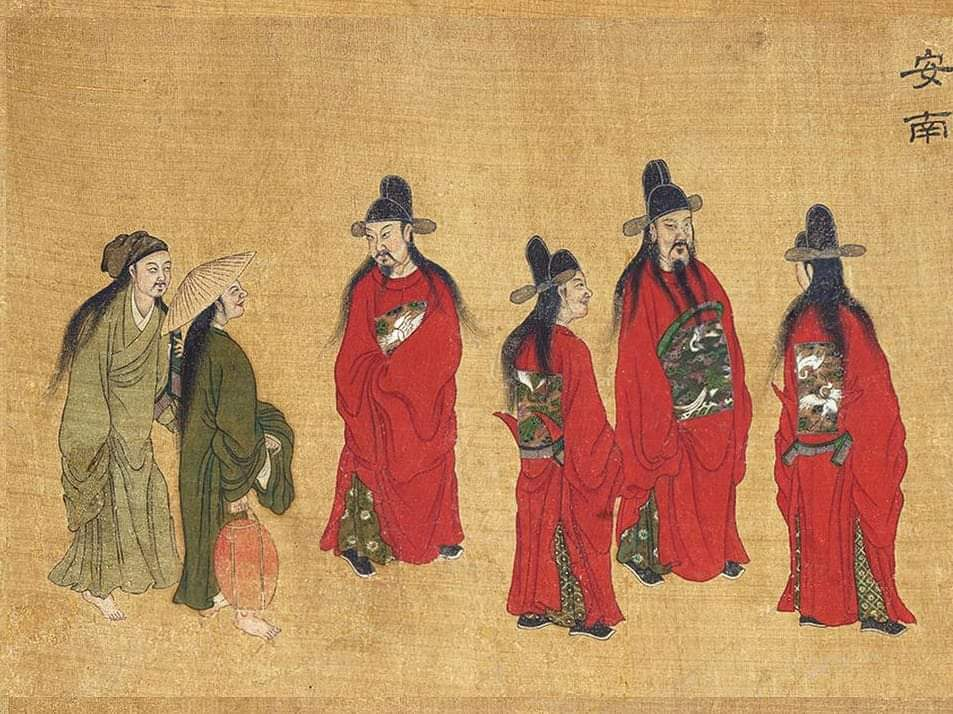
Nón lá during the Revival Lê dynasty

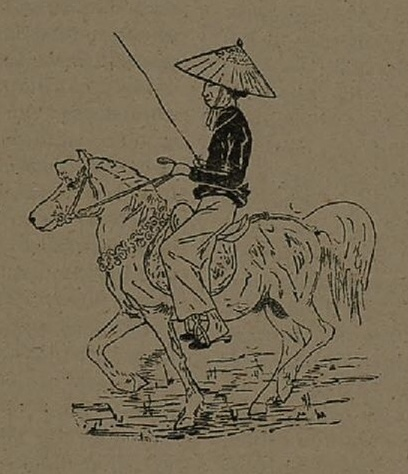
Painting of a man wearing a nón ngựa (a kind of hat for noble men) riding a horse in Nam Phong Tạp chí No. 2

Cones are usually conical in shape, but there are also some types of cones that are wide and flattened. The conical leaves are arranged on a frame consisting of small bamboo slats bent into an arc, pinned with thread, or silk or monofilament. The spokes are made into thin, small and supple bamboo sticks and then bent into circles of different diameters to form cones. All are arranged next to each other on a pyramidal mold.

Nón lá is made by flattening each leaf, cutting the top diagonally with scissors, threading around 24 to 35 leaves together with a needle for one turn, and then equally arranging them on the hat mold. Since the conical leaves are thin and easily destroyed by heavy rain, the artisans created a layer between the two layers of conical leaves using the dry bamboo sheath, giving the hat strength and durability.

In the next stage, the craftsman uses rope to tie the conical leaves that have been spread evenly on the mold with the hat frame together and then they begin to sew. The worker puts the leaves on the side of the cone and then uses a wire and a sewing needle to make the hat into a pyramid. After forming, the hat is coated with a layer of varnish to increase durability and aesthetics (can add art decoration for hats used in art). In the middle of the 3rd and 4th spokes, the worker uses only two symmetrical pairs to tie the straps. Straps are usually made from velvet, soft silk, with many colors.

== Classification ==
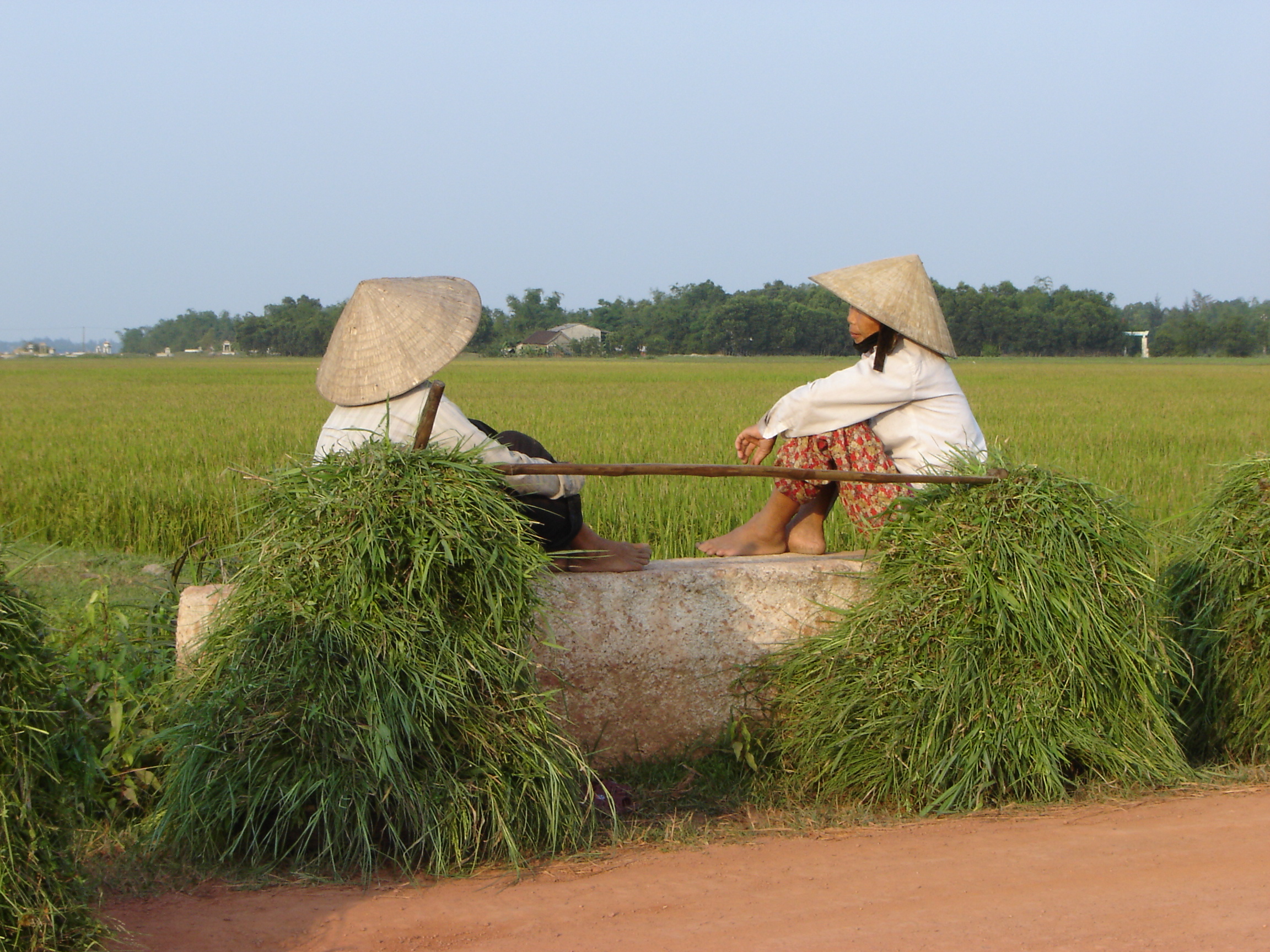
Two farmers resting after a morning of work

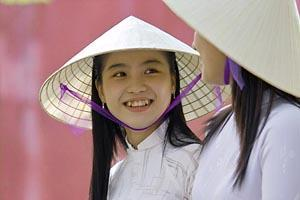
Female student with áo dài and nón lá.

Nón lá is a common name for many other types of hats:

- nón ngựa or nón Gò Găng made in Bình Định, made of lụi leaves, often used when riding a horse
- nón cụ, often worn in weddings in South Vietnam
- nón Ba tầm, popular in the North of Vietnam
- nón bài thơ, a thin white conical hat with pictures or a few verses usually from in Huế
- nón dấu, a cap with pointed tips of beast soldiers from the feudal period
- nón gõ, a hat made of straw, grafted for soldiers in the feudal period
- nón khua, a cap worn by servants of feudal mandarins
- nón rơm, a hat made of hard-pressed straw
- nón cời, a type of hat with tassels at the edge of the hat
- nón lá sen or nón liên diệp
- nón thúng, a round conical hat similar to the basket's basket, from the idiom "nón thúng quai thao"
- nón chảo, with a cone that is round on the top like an upside-down pan

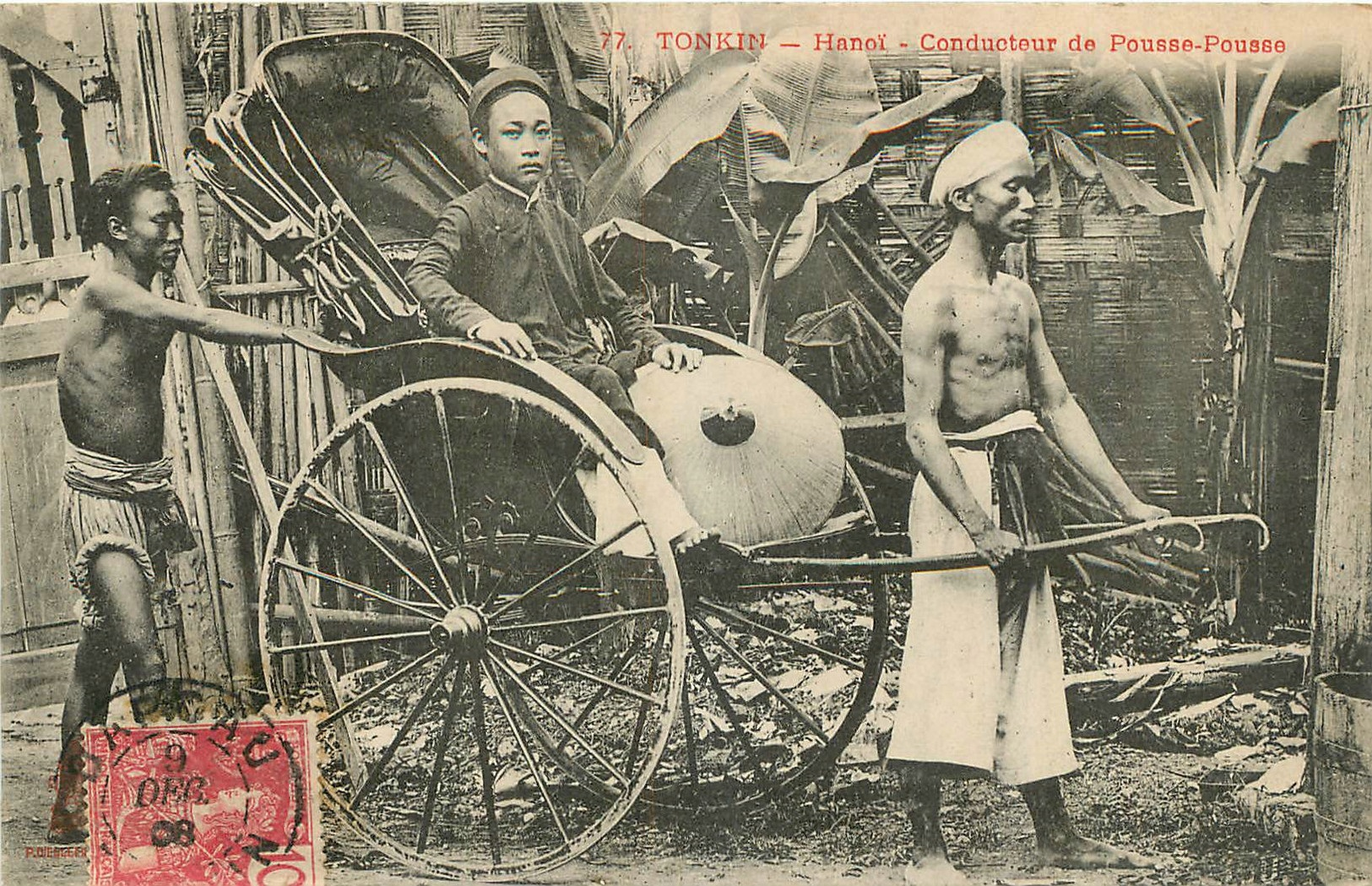
A man's nón ngựa on a rickshaw

Today, it is most commonly referred to the type of cone with a pointed tip.

== Uses ==
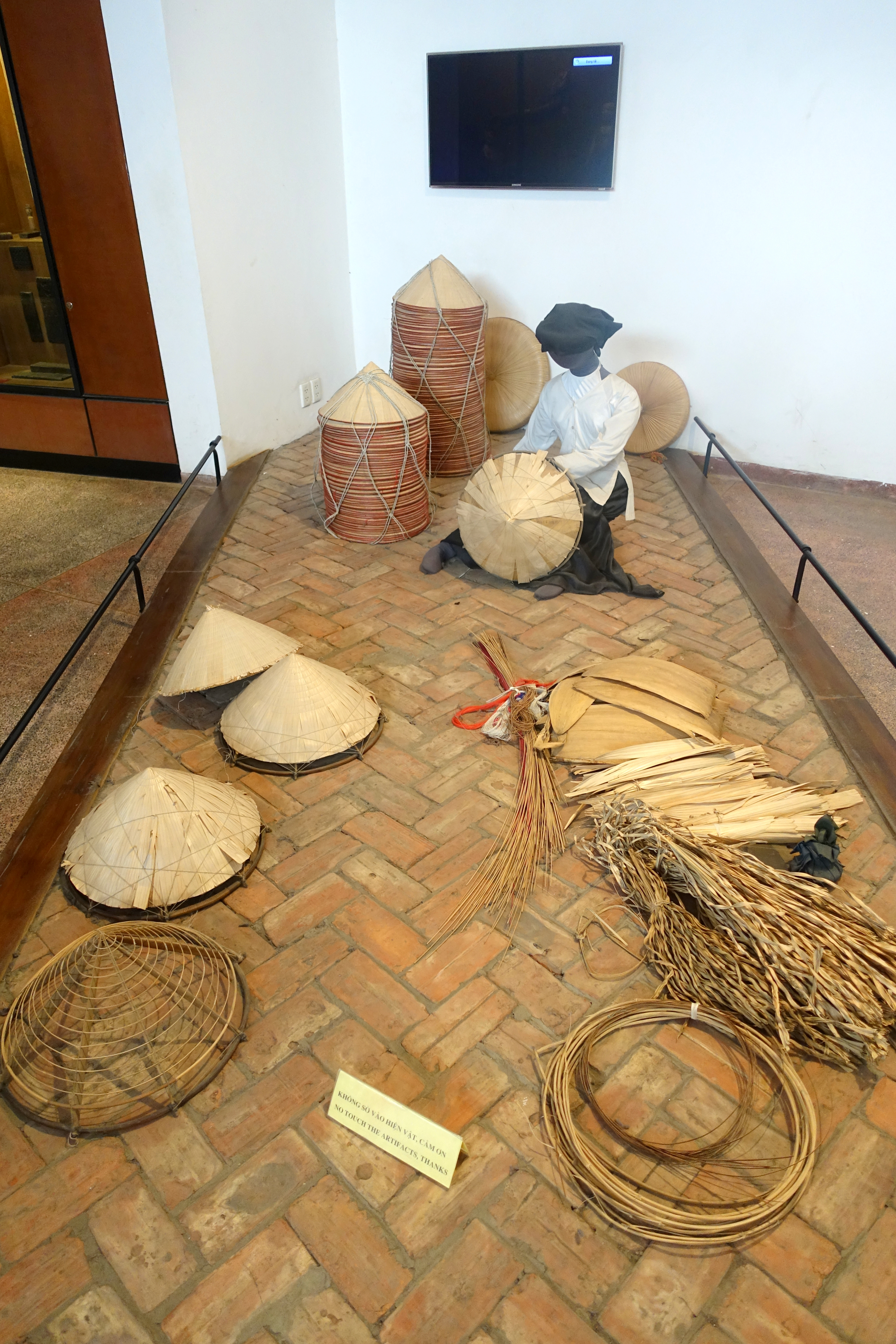
Diorama of making nón lá inside the Vietnam Museum of Ethnology, Hanoi

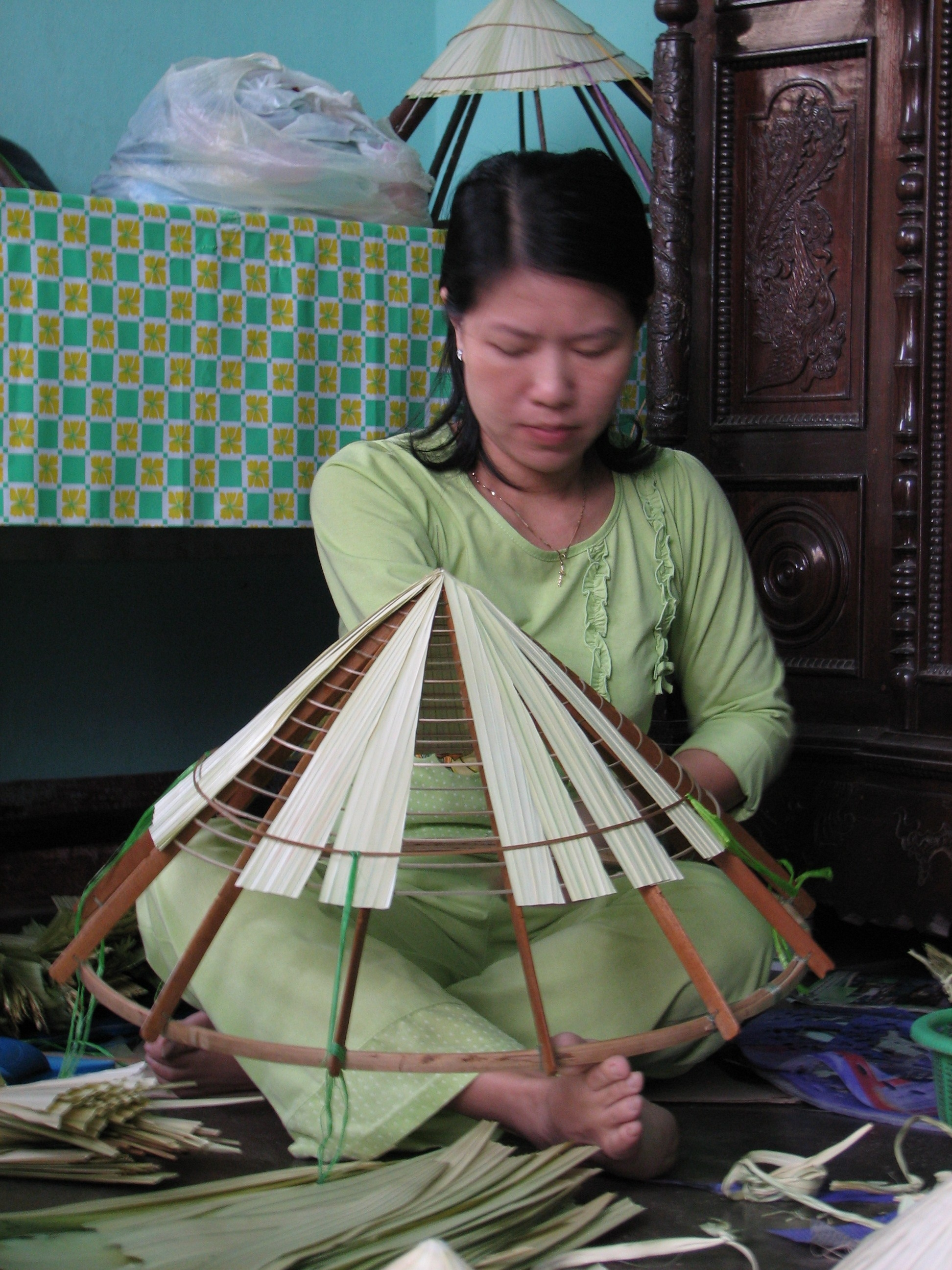
Handmade nón lá knitting in Huế.

Nón lá are often used to protect the wearer from the sun, rain, and can be used as a fan. Sometimes it can be used to draw water or to store it. Today, nón lá are also considered a special gift for tourists when visiting Vietnam.

== Cultural Aspects ==
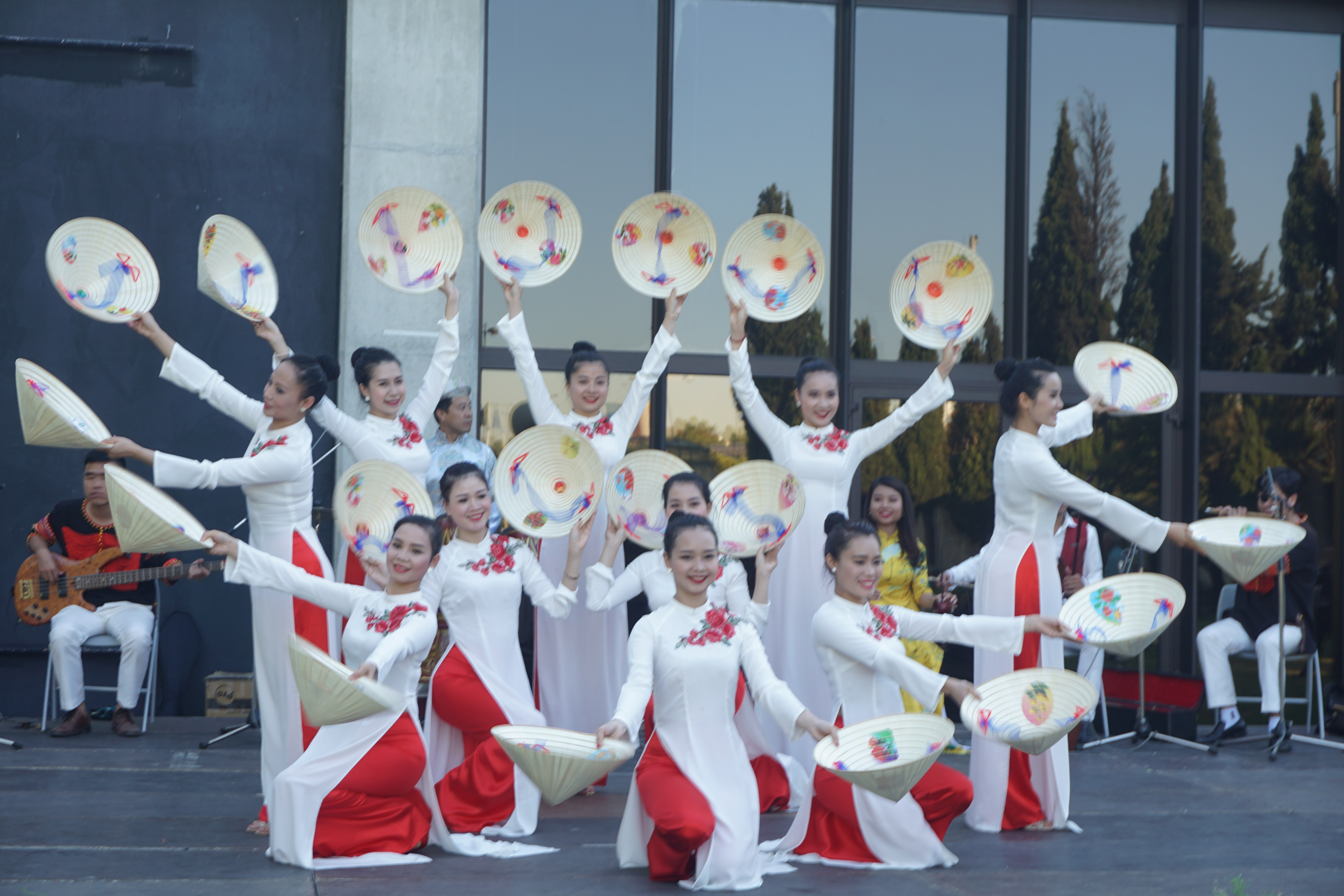
The girls are performing the nón lá dance

In theatrical art, nón lá appear in the girls' dance performances. It can be used within choreographies to create intricate illusions through the gentle and flexible movements of the dancers.

== See also ==
- List of hat styles
- Ba tầm
- Khăn vấn
- Vietnamese clothing
- Asian conical hat
