= Đinh Tự =

Mũ Đinh Tự (chữ Hán: 帽丁字), also known as mũ chữ đinh, mũ Nhục, is a type of hat with the shape of the letter Đinh (丁) was a type of hat worn in Vietnam by civil and military officers in the Lê dynasty and fell out of favor in the 19th century. Nowadays it can still be seen at local festivals.

== Images ==
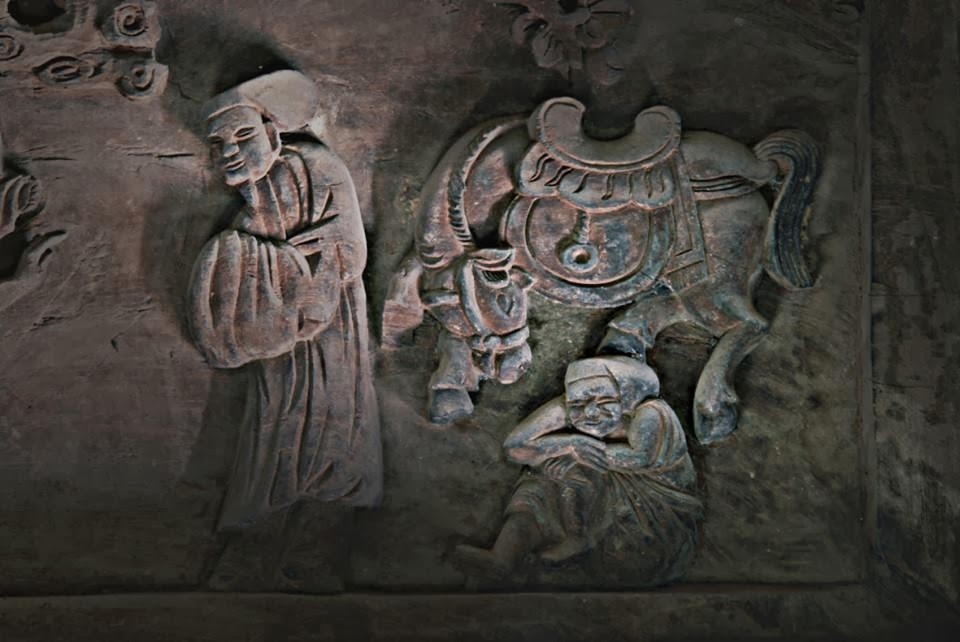
Đinh Tự hat at Cầu Hiền, Đình Hoành Sơn, Nghệ An

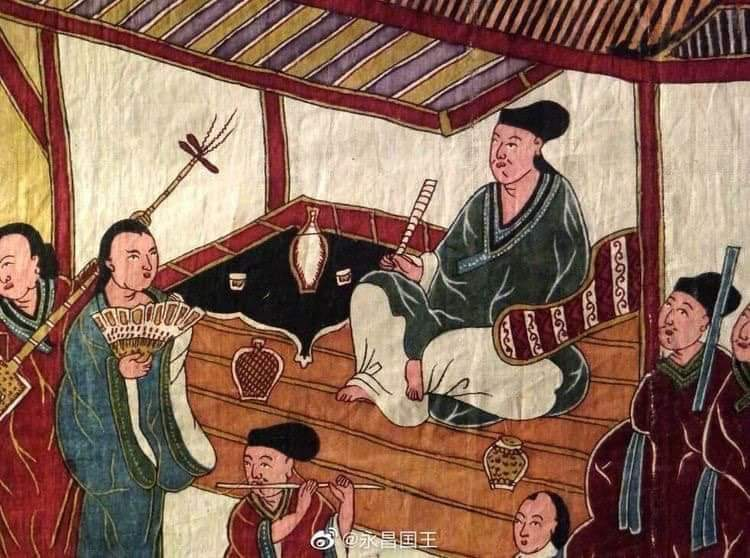
Paintings of activities of the Revival Lê dynasty show that men at that time wore Đinh Tự hats

== See also ==
- List of hat styles
- Ba tầm
- Phốc Đầu
