= Phốc Đầu =

Hats for Vietnamese mandarins

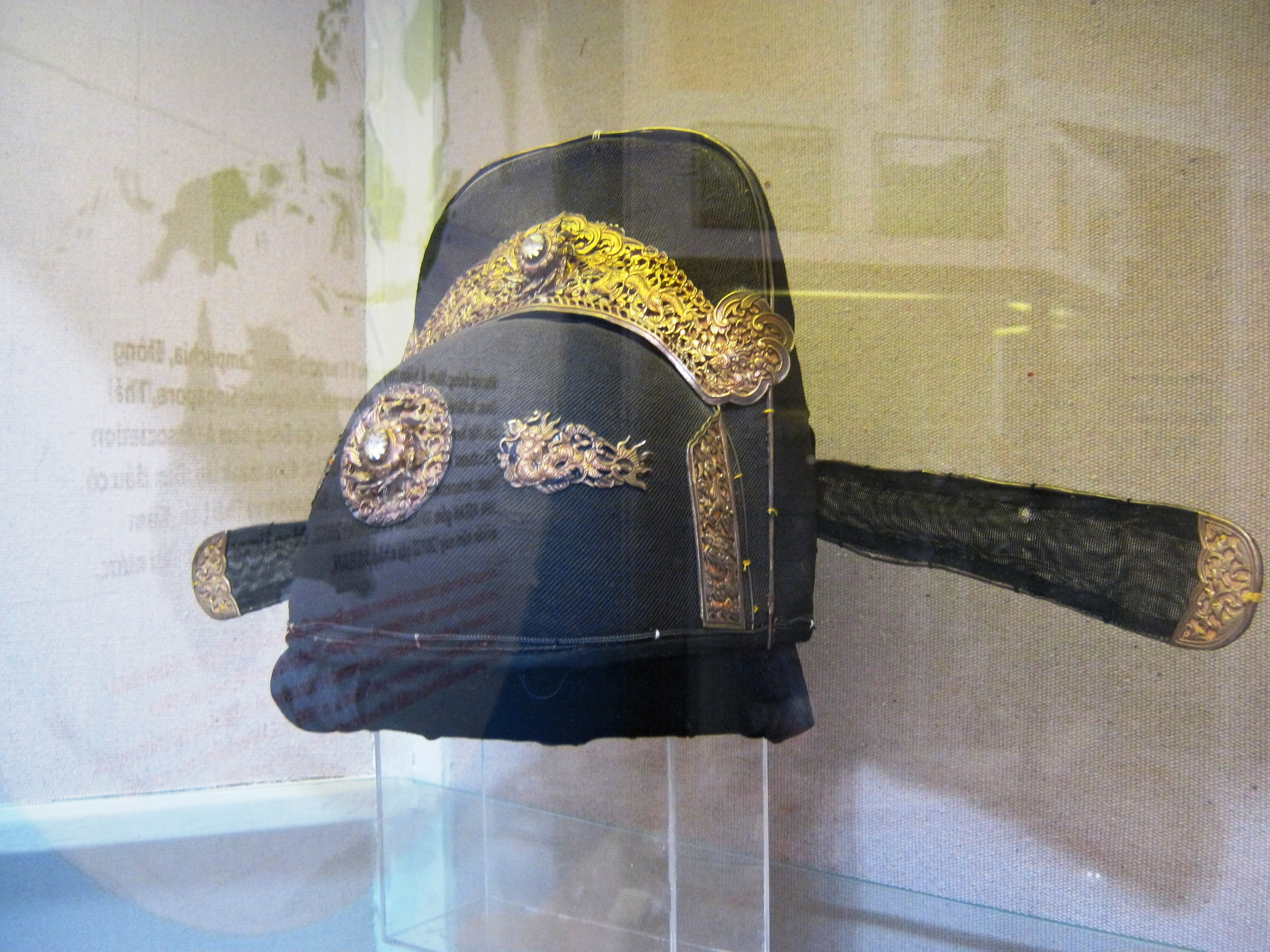
Phốc đầu of the Nguyễn dynasty

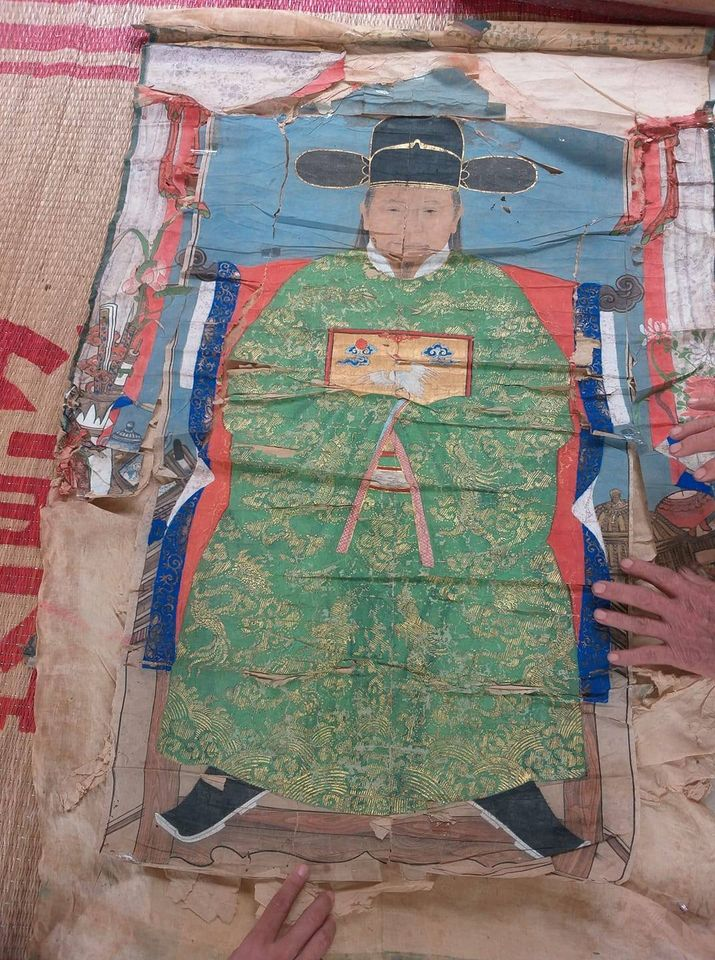
Mandarin of the Revival Lê dynasty

Phốc Đầu (chữ Hán: 幞頭) is derived from the Chinese Futou (襆頭). It was formal wear for Vietnamese mandarin officials. It is the predecessor to the Mũ cánh chuồn or also called Mũ ô sa, which was derived from the Chinese Wushamao (烏紗帽).

== Gallery ==
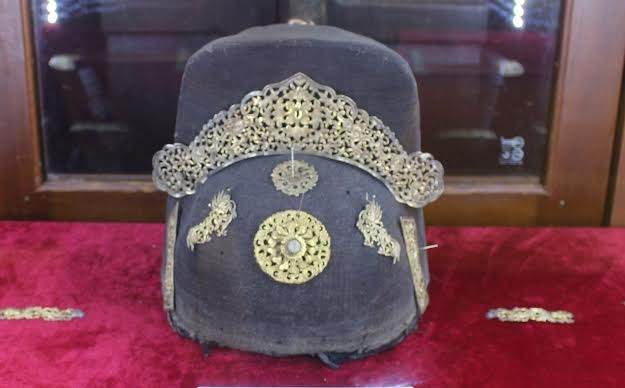
19th century Phốc Đầu with Kim Bác Sơn

== See also ==
- Ba tầm
- Đinh Tự
