= Charles-Édouard Hocquard =

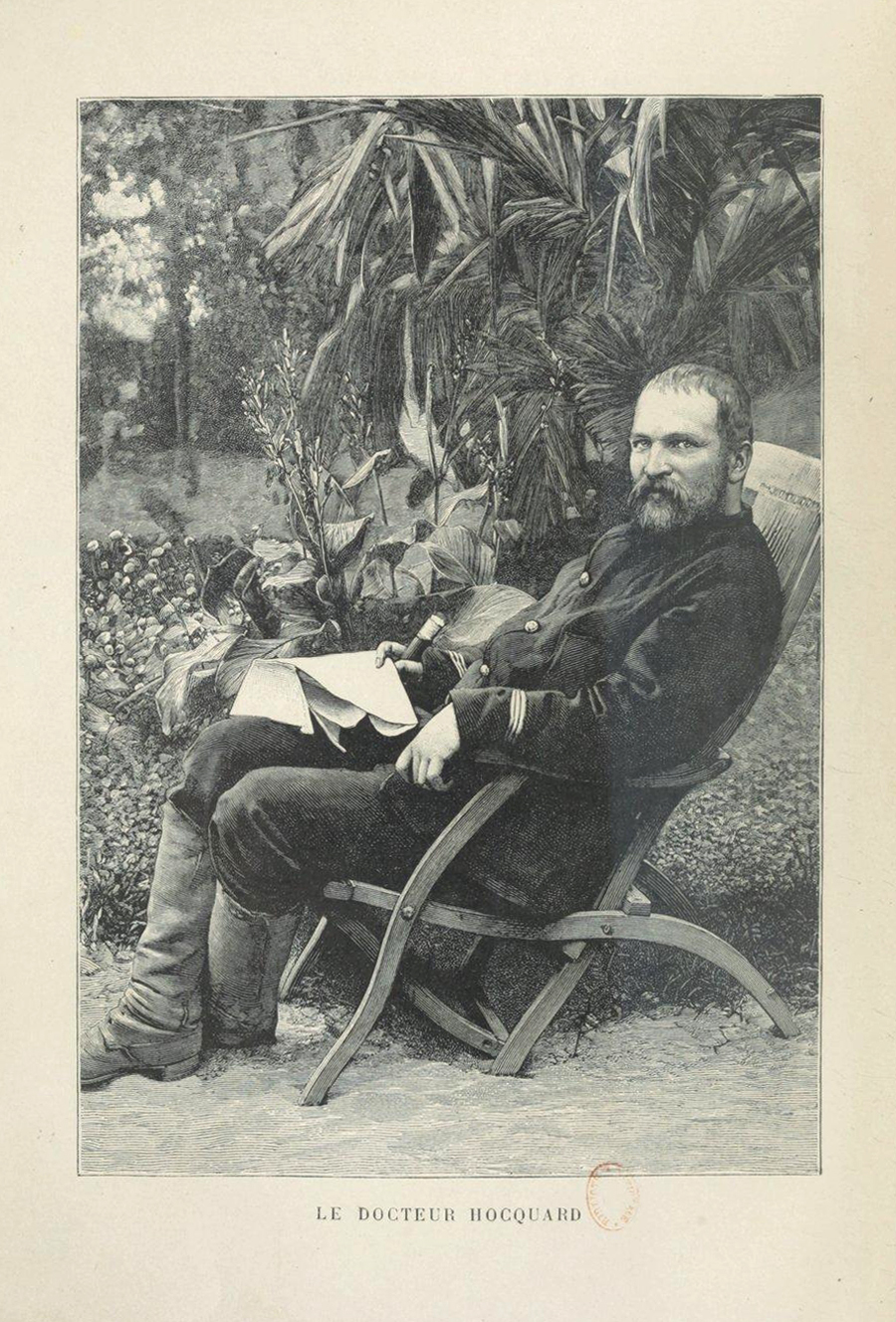

Charles-Édouard Hocquard (Nancy 1853 - Lyons 1911) was a French medical doctor and explorer, remembered primarily as a photographer.

== Biography ==
Born in Nancy, he studied military medicine in Paris at Val-de-Grâce Hospital. He volunteered for the French expedition in Tonkin (now North of Vietnam) in 1883 and explored Indochina, from the Chinese frontiers to the delta of Saigon.

His photographs were displayed at the Antwerp Universal Exhibition in 1885 where they were awarded by a gold medal. He published Trente mois au Tonkin (Thirty Months in Tonkin) in Le Tour du Monde (1889 and 1891) and Une campagne au Tonkin in 1892.

Hocquard travelled to Madagascar and Comores in 1894, and became director of the military health service of the French expeditionary troops in Madagascar. He published in 1896 L'Expédition de Madagascar, journal de campagne.

He died in Lyons in 1911 from influenza.

== Photographs ==
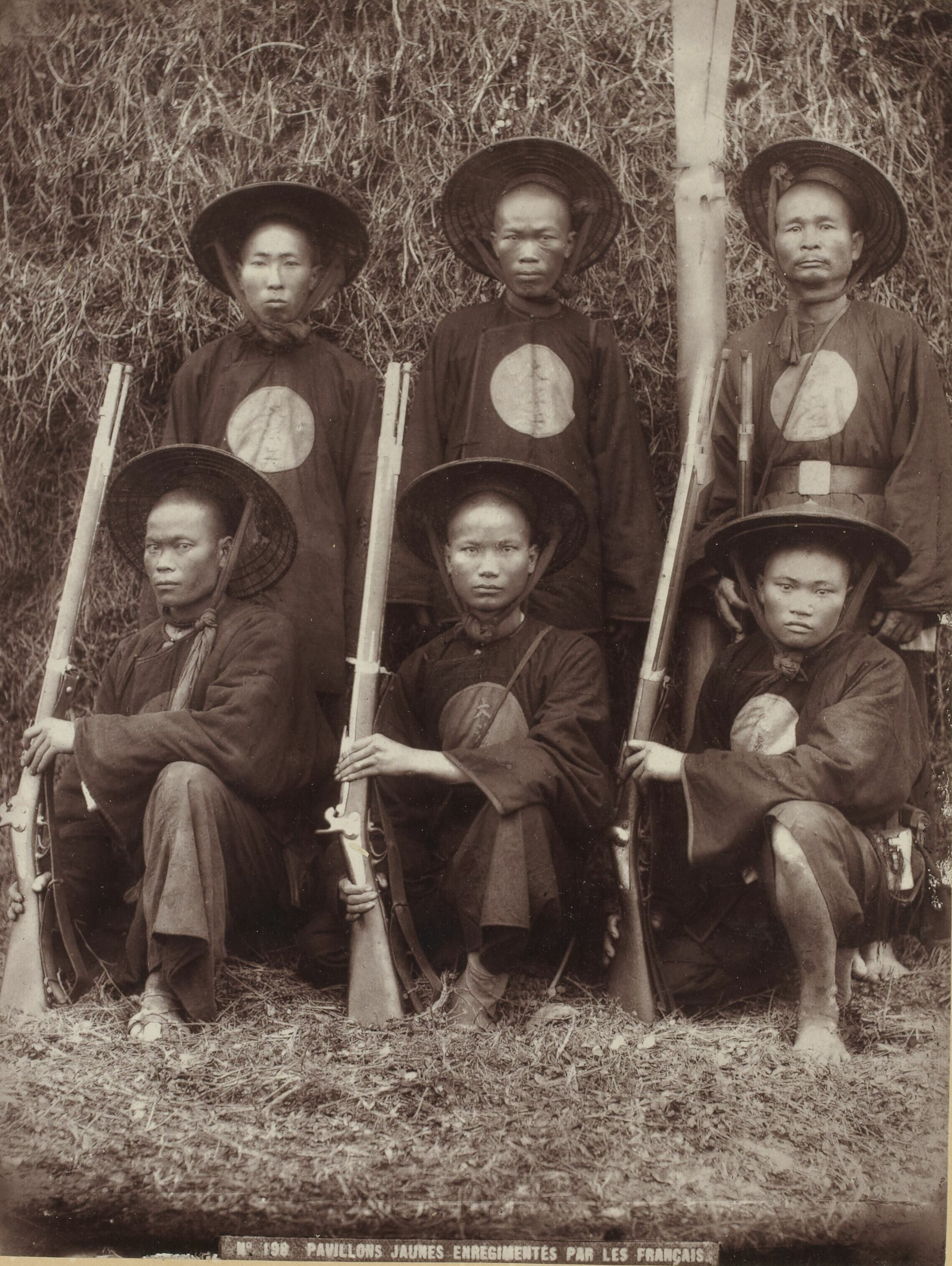
Soldiers of the Yellow Flag Army, enlisted by the French, 1883–1886

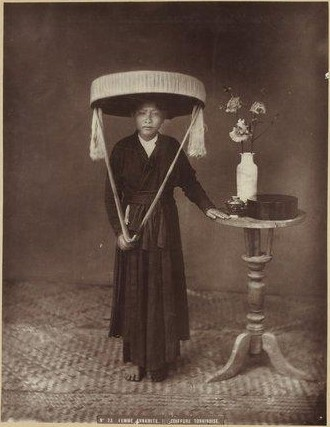
Woman from Tonkin, 1883–1886

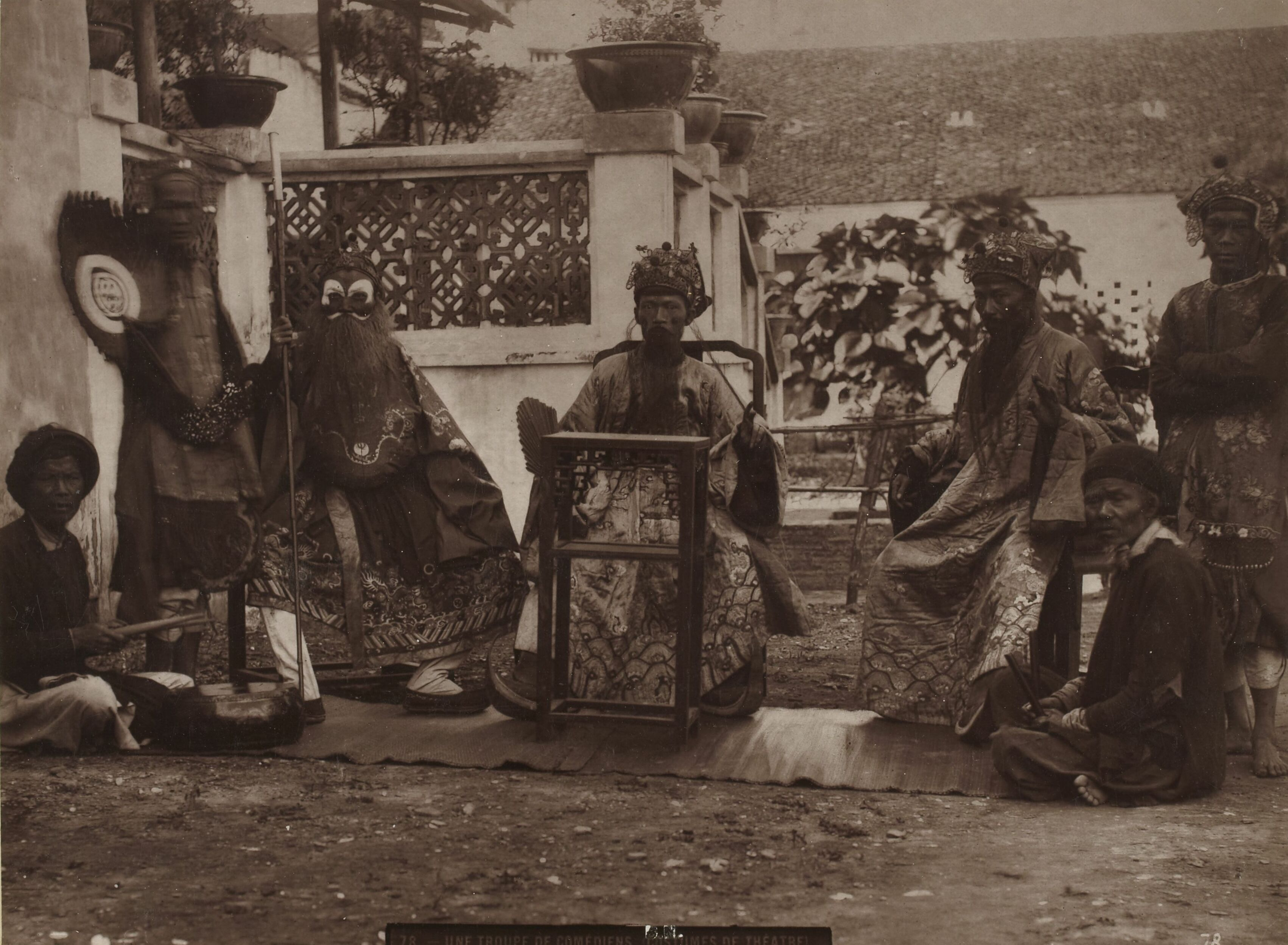
Actors, 1883–1886

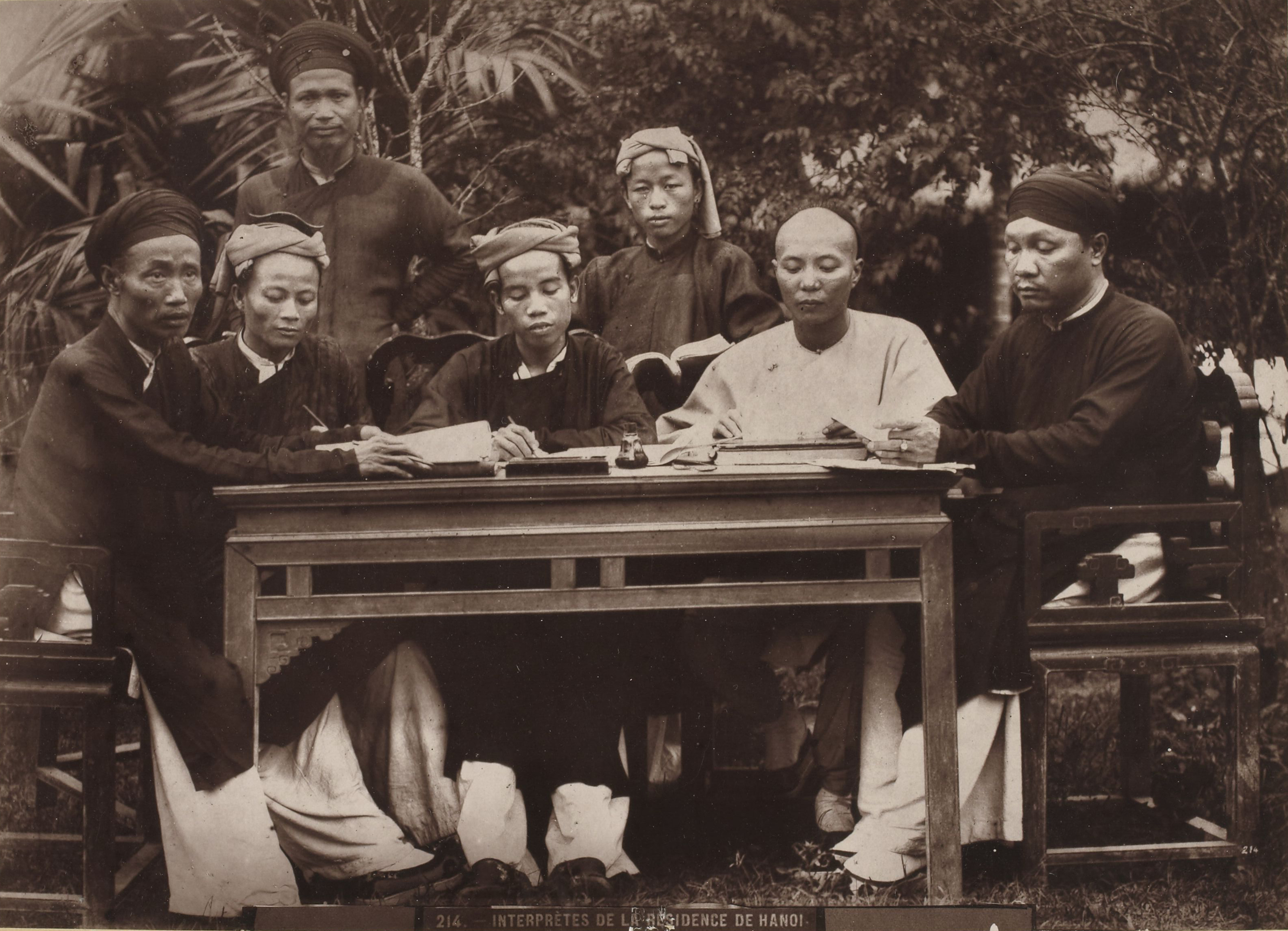
Translators at Hanoi Residency, 1883–1886

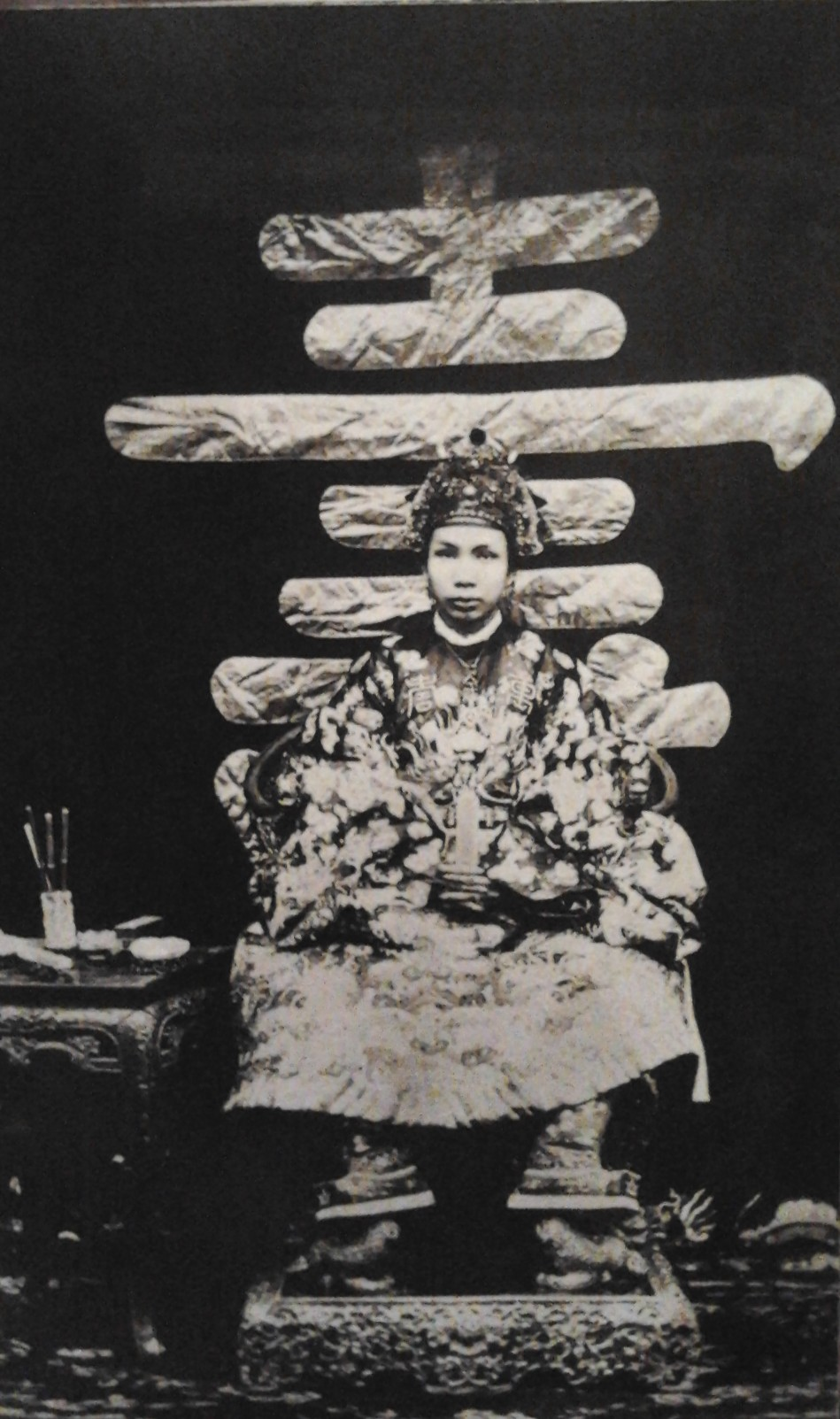
King Dong Khanh's enthronement, 1885

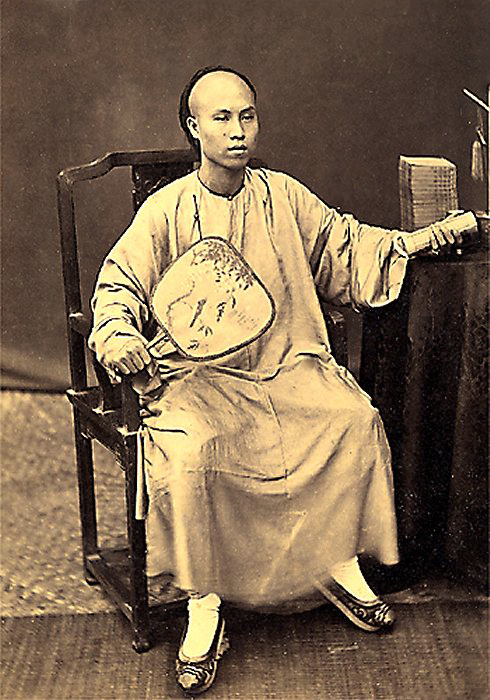
Hoa merchant in Hanoi, 1885

== Sources ==
- Antoine Lefébure (dir.), Explorateurs photographes. Territoires inconnus. 1850-1930, La Découverte, 2003 (pp. 40–42)
