= Traditional Vietnamese wedding =

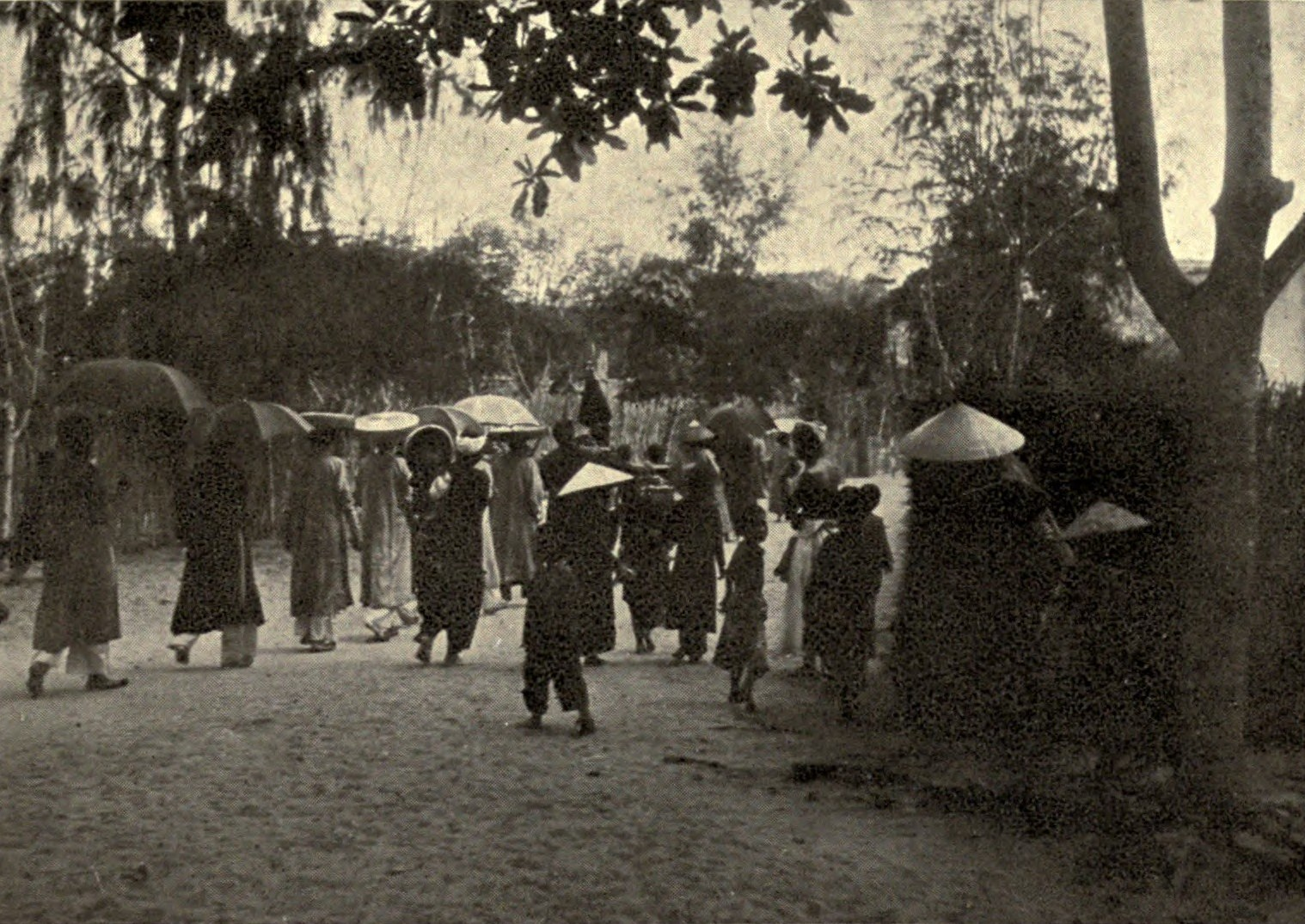
A wedding in Annam (Middle of Vietnam) in the 1900s. The bridegroom's family was going to bride's house to ask her parents to take her home, a traditional process of Vietnamese people.

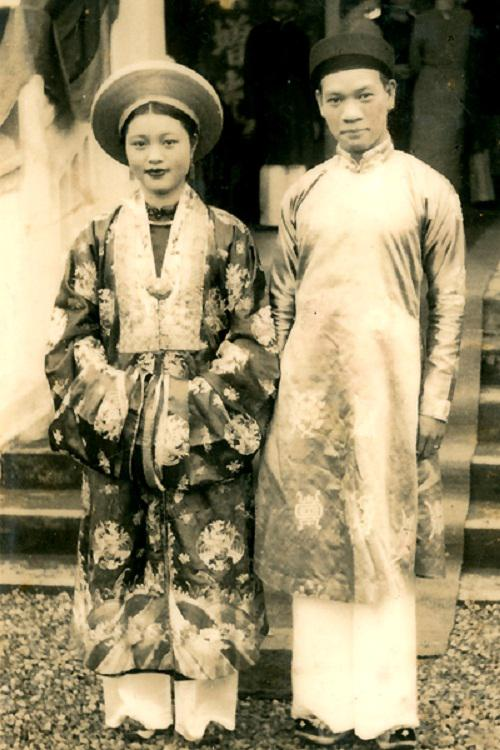
Wedding of professor Nguyễn Văn Huyên and Ms. Vi Kim Ngọc in 1936. The bride was wearing áo nhật bình, the groom was wearing áo ngũ thân and they used khăn vấn on their head.

The traditional Vietnamese wedding is one of the most important ceremonies in Vietnamese culture, which is influenced by Confucian and Buddhist ideologies.

== Traditional Wedding Clothes ==
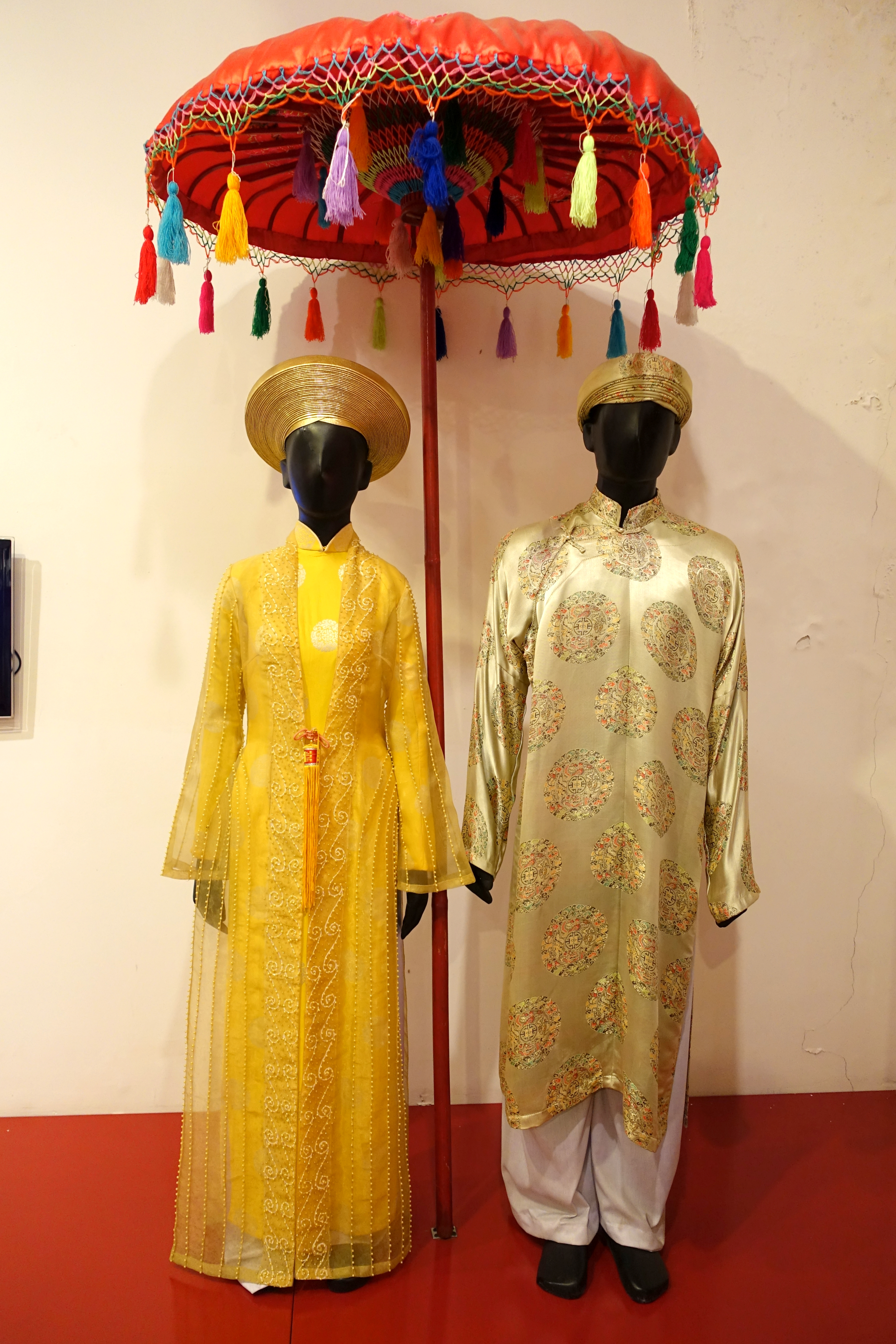
A typical wedding gown for both the bride and groom. Nowadays, some gowns take on Western influences, such as a long train in the back or wearing colours besides the typical blue and red palette.

Traditional Vietnamese clothes have always been diverse depending on the area and occasion, so wedding clothes varied in style and trend throughout history. It was only after 1744 and during Nguyễn dynasty that men and women began to wear very elaborate áo tấc (ancient formal áo dài with long sleeves) for their wedding ceremonies; this tradition still continues into the modern era with various trends and styles over the years. Nowadays, men would either follow suit with their own male version of the Áo dài or wear a tuxedo.

The traditional gowns were modelled after the áo nhật bình (worn by royalty women and ladies) of Nguyễn dynasty members of the court. The fashion trend of the Nguyễn dynasty has remained popular and is still used today by Vietnamese individuals both in and outside of Vietnam, with some couples altering the design slightly to modernise or suit their taste; the silhouette of the traditional gown still remains the same. The wedding gown compared to other traditional Vietnamese clothes is more intricate in terms of design and only reserved for the wedding days.

For brides, the outfit includes an extravagant (often transparent) outer cloak; some brides choose to not wear it in favour of showing off their dresses more or replace the cloak with an attached cape instead. Traditionally, no jewellery will be worn by the bride until later on in the ceremony; if worn, it was typically simple and can be easily taken off. Both brides and grooms, if the groom chooses to wear áo dài as well, wear a headpiece called a khăn vấn; the turban can range from simple and small to elaborate and big. Women would wear the female variation of the headpiece while men would wear the male one, which is smaller and simpler than the bride's. Both headpieces can be matching or contrasting the color of their gowns.

By tradition from Nguyễn dynasty, the gowns of the bride had many layers, including pink (hồng), blue or green (xanh), and the outermost layer was black. Huế brides wore red (điều - đỏ) layer inside a dark blue (xanh chàm) thin layer, the 2 colours mixed became purple colour. Nowadays, the wedding outfits can vary in colours. Reds and pinks remain a popular choice for brides while grooms go with blues or blacks. The bride and the groom can also have their traditional outfits match in color or design instead. In terms of design, the clothes are usually embroidered or beaded with imperial symbols such as a phoenix or dragon; nature imagery can also be seen.

These gowns are either custom made for the couple or rented from a bridal shop, like Western wedding outfits. Like the Áo dài, the wedding clothing design can range in sleeve length, collar type, and the type of materials used to create the gown. For the bride, the design is traditionally long sleeved and high collared. Wedding Áo dài for men do not vary much in design. Because the gown is typically made of lighter fabric, Vietnamese weddings that occur in colder regions outside of Vietnam will be scheduled during warmer seasons or the dresses will be designed to suit the colder climate.

Bridesmaids and groomsmen may also wear their áo dài as well. Bridesmaids will traditionally wear matching pink gowns or in a color contrasting the bride's own gown, and groomsmen can wear black, blue, or matching the bridesmaid gowns. The wearing of Áo dài by the bridesmaids and groomsmen is equivalent to like Western bridesmaid dresses and groomsmen tuxedos, with the gowns being much more simple compared to what the bride and groom wears. Depending on the couple's preferences, the bridesmaid and groomsmen may also wear their own khăn đóng, though a more plain and smaller one compared to the bride.

The rest of the wedding attendees will either wear their own respective Áo dài without the headpiece or formal Western clothes instead. Some attendees may wear traditional Vietnamese clothing for the beginning of the actual wedding ceremony and change into Western clothes afterwards for the reception or even earlier for the Western ceremony. It is often expected for all the women in both sides, especially the bride's, in the ceremony to wear an Áo dài.

Previous to the Nguyễn dynasty, it is likely that women simply wore fancy, elaborate versions of áo tứ thân.

== The Proposal and Engagement ==
The entire wedding process begins with the lễ dạm ngõ, or the proposal. The future groom's family visits the future bride's family to ask for permission for the soon-to-be groom and bride to be established as a couple. In the past, when marriages were commonly arranged by the parents or the extended family, this ceremony was used to begin preparations for the wedding, and the future bride was traditionally not present during the event. The purpose of marriage at the time was mainly to create an alliance between families within the community, so the lễ dạm ngõ is meant for both families to begin preparations for the said alliance that will occur. Unlike many events that will occur during the actual wedding, the proposal is very informal; only immediate family members (mostly the parents) are involved and arrangements were done over drinks and food; the groom's family traditionally will provide the wine, sweets, betel leaves and areca nuts as a symbol of their agreement. The families will use this time to also discuss the dowry and other conditions that need to be addressed. The wedding (and possibly the engagement) date will be chosen during the proposal. This is typically decided by a Buddhist monk, Spiritual leader, or fortune teller due to the spiritual nature of the occasion, and the date is based on the couple's horoscopes; because of this, the proposal may last for a few days to finalise plans and dates.

An engagement ceremony, called the Đám Hỏi, usually occurs half a year or so before the wedding. The engagement ceremony serves as an announcement to the rest of the community that a wedding will take place soon and marks the day that the future bride is now the fiancée of the future groom.

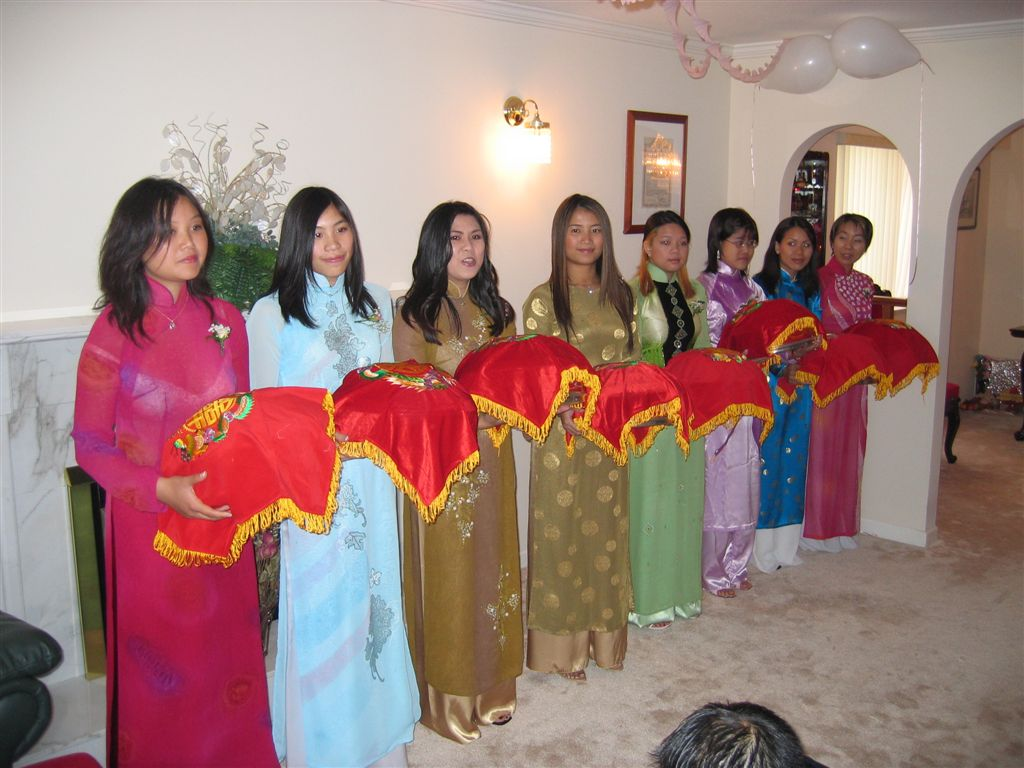
Gifts are exchanged in a similar manner for both the engagement and the wedding ceremony.

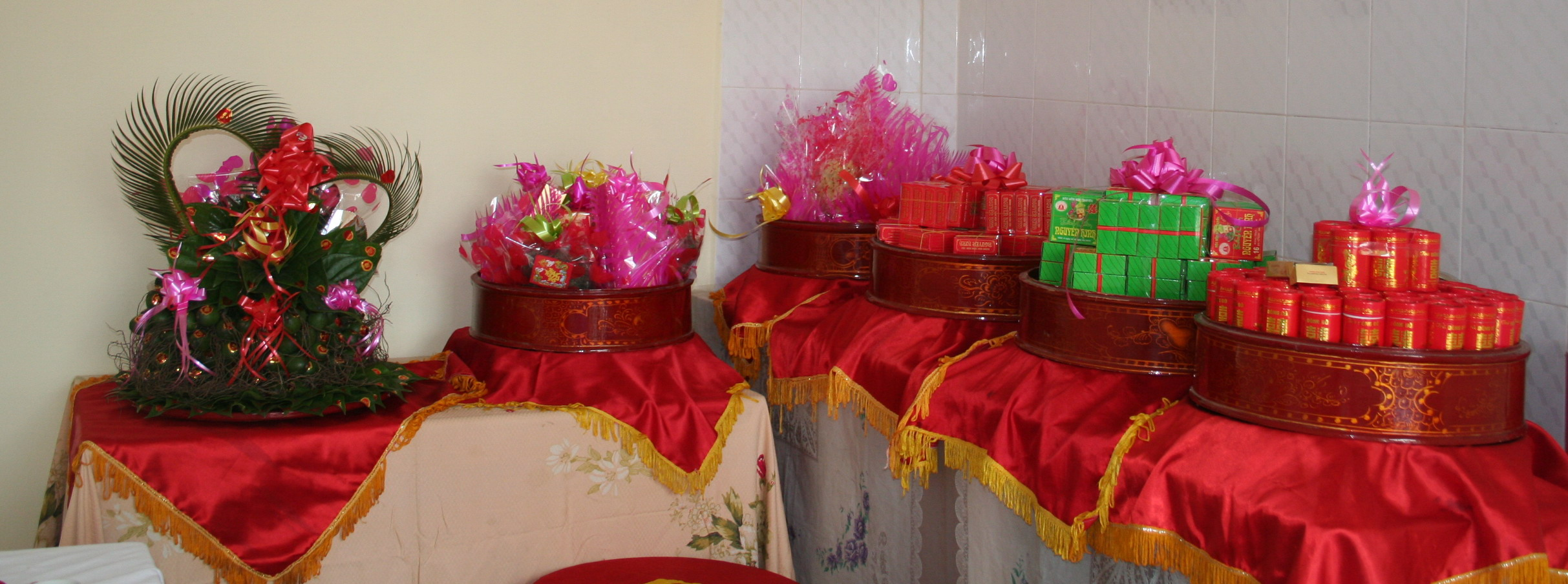
Traditional Vietnamese wedding gifts from the groom's family to the bride's family: Betel & Areca catechu, tea box, Bánh cốm, Bánh phu thê

The ceremony was mainly used to announce that the arrangement is confirmed and the wedding shall happen; usually the bride and groom will have no final say in the matter, but some are consulted based on many factors such as interests and horoscopes. It was not unusual for the future bride and groom to meet for the first time on the day of their engagement. However, in the last few decades, the practice of arranged marriages became obsolete, and the engagement ceremony is barely practised. Those that still celebrate the ceremony typically do so as a means to simply announce the engagement; it is a general party that kickstarts the upcoming wedding.

The Đám Hỏi is similar to the actual wedding ceremony, though more simpler and with some variations. The future groom's family and friends will go to his future bride's home with offerings; traditionally, these gifts are fruits, betel leaves, areca leaves, wine, tea, fruits, cakes, tobacco, jewellery and a roasted pig. The gifts are contained in amount of lacquer boxes, called mâm quả, that are covered in red paper or cloth and carried by the younger unmarried men of the future groom's family; the amount of each gift is even (with the exception of the roasted pig) while the amount of boxes are odd. (In Vietnamese culture, odd numbers and red symbolise luck for the young couple). The future groom and his entourage will wait at the door until the other family says the bride is ready. Once the group is accepted into the home, the gifts are received by the same number of younger unmarried women from the future bride's side. Refreshments prepared by the future bride's side are made ready to be served to the other family members. A representative from each family will introduce the family members of both sides respectively; the representatives by tradition are respected male elders of each family, and introductions begin with the future groom's side. The representative of the first side will explain their purpose of being there and their request for the future bride's hand in marriage. Once the gifts are unwrapped and approved by the future bride's family, the future bride herself is then brought out. She will then pour tea or water to invite her future groom's family and the future groom will conversely do the same for her family. Some of the gifts brought in will be placed on the ancestral altar. The future bride and groom will burn incense to notify the future bride's ancestors of the engagement. Jewelry, typically an engagement ring, a pair of earrings, and at least one circular gold necklace called a kiềng, will then be placed onto the future bride. The ceremony will either end or a simple banquet hosted by the future bride's side will occur afterwards. During the ceremony, both members attending may either wear an Áo dài or formal Western clothing. The future bride in particular may wear an Áo dài that had been gifted to her by her own family in celebration for her upcoming engagement.

Traditionally, future brides would embroider a pair of lovebirds, known as chim uyên ương, and give them to their fiancé during the ceremony. The gift was the equivalent to today's engagement ring, and the birds symbolise fidelity and love.

== The Wedding Ceremony ==
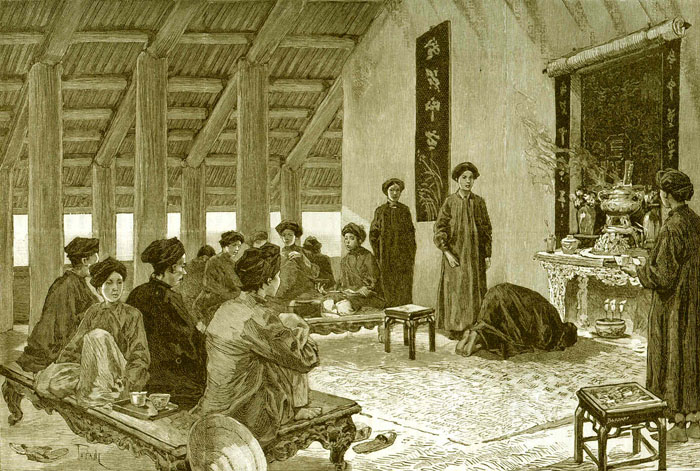
The figure at the wedding ceremonies of Central Vietnam in 1894

Weddings in the past were also seen as family reunions; family members from the bride's side will travel to the bride's house a few days prior to participate in the wedding. These members will help with the preparation for the wedding and serve as witnesses to the ceremony.

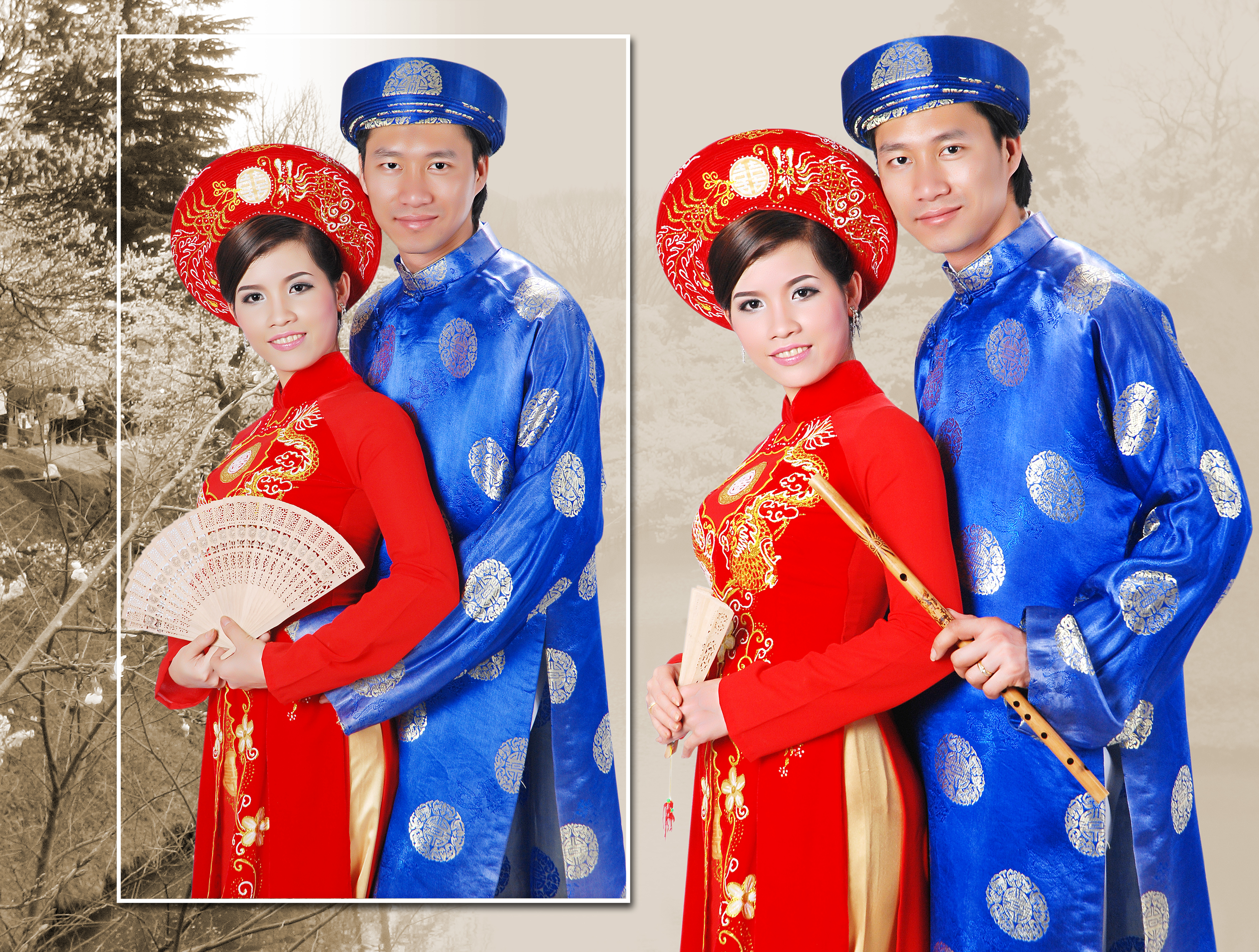
Traditional wedding áo dài with head piece

The wedding itself consists of an extensive set of ceremonies: asking permission to receive the bride, receiving the bride at her house, and bringing the bride to the groom's house. Both Vietnamese and oversea-Vietnamese who desire to have a hybrid traditional Vietnamese and Western-style wedding will often incorporate a Western-style wedding ceremony. At the end of the ceremonies, there is a wedding reception for the two families and their guests.

=== Asking to Receive the Bride ===
Before the wedding day, the groom's family would make a trip to the bride's home with a gift of betel nuts to officially ask permission to receive the bride. At this time, the bride's family would confirm the wedding and further proceedings would take place.

This now obsolete ceremony was used in the past to confirm—last minute—that the marriage would still take place; this ceremony was more so used to confirm that the wedding would proceed and the bride has not run away. Permission must be asked by the groom and his family or the marriage will not take place. Once asked and approved, the groom will be welcomed and the bride may be received in the next stage of the ceremony.

In modern times, families that still perform this ceremony do so in an informal setting done over snacks and drinks. It served as a chance for immediate in-laws to get acquainted with each other and start wedding plan discussions. Often, this part of the ceremony can span days.

An engagement party may be held 6 months before the wedding. This party serves to announce the couple's upcoming nuptials and follows a similar process as the wedding, though in a more casual setting. The bride and groom do not wear their wedding gowns; the former may wear an Áo dài gifted to her by her family as a wedding gift.

=== Receiving the Bride at Her House ===
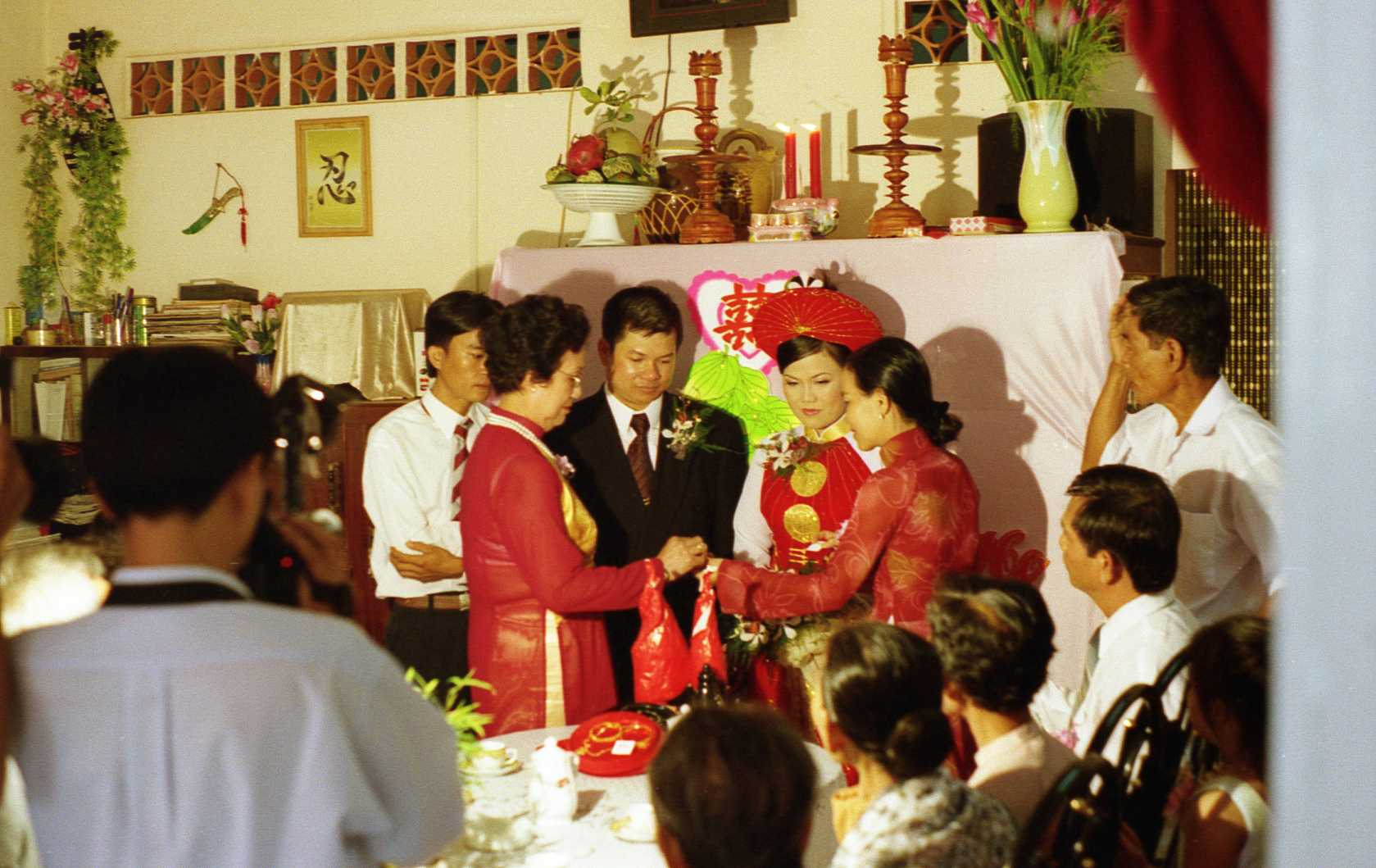
A Vietnamese country wedding

An informal tradition between the bride and the mother will occur the night before the wedding. The mother of the bride will comb the bride's hair as a symbol of their last moment together as mother and daughter. During this time, the mother will instruct the bride on how to be a good wife, mother, and daughter-in-law for her new family. The event is often marked with sadness, as marriage for the bride traditionally represented her severing ties from her family and especially her own mother, and it is a common practice for mothers to style their daughter's hair up until the daughter's wedding. The tradition itself is no longer largely practised today, but it represents the strong bond between mother and daughter that is prominent in Vietnamese culture.

On the day of the wedding, the procession of the groom's family is led in specific order. The first person would be the representative of the groom's house followed by the groom's father, the groom, then the rest of his family and close friends. The number of people participating in the groom's procession varies but is usually restricted to a smaller number (20 or so). This typically makes it easier on the bride's family, who must receive all the guests in their home. If the groom's entourage is very small or small in comparison to the bride's, some of the male members of the bride's family may join on the other side to help out.

In the past, the groom's mother might not take part in the procession as a sign that she would not be a threat to the future bride; she would even "hide" for a short period upon the bride's welcoming to the groom's home. However, this practice has long been abandoned.

In the procession, the groom, his family and friends bear elaborately decorated mâm quả, or lacquer boxes, covered in red cloth. Inside these boxes are gifts representing the dowry that the groom's family will bring to the bride's family. Gifts include betel leaves, fruit, cakes, a roasted pig, fabric, and an abundance of jewellery for the bride, and are typically carried by the groomsmen- like the engagement ceremony. Usually, the number of gift boxes is 5, 7, or 9.

Upon arriving at the bride's home, the procession lights fireworks to alert the bride's family, who then lights its own round of firecrackers to welcome the groom's procession. Traditionally, the groom and his entourage are not allowed in until the bride's family believe they are ready to do so, and bad luck may fall on the young couple if the groom does not wait until the approval. The lacquer boxes are handed from the groomsmen to the bridesmaids who then place them on a table. The representatives of both families introduce each family member of their respective sides, and the groom's representative asks the bride's family for permission to take the bride home. The gifts are unwrapped in front of the bride's family, with some of the gifts offered to the ancestral altar, and the groom is given permission to greet the bride, who is finally brought out (usually by an unmarried female of her family). The groom will bow to the bride's parents and then give the bride a bouquet of flowers.

The permission ceremony begins in front of the bride's ancestral altar. The bride and groom, with their respective parents, burn incense sticks, asking for permission from the ancestors to bless them. The couple turns and bows to their parents, gives thanks for raising and protecting them. The bride and groom will then bow to each other.

A formal tea and candle ceremony along with speeches follow. While tea has always been an essential part of Vietnamese life, Vietnamese tea culture is not as complex or ritually rigid as its counterparts in China, Japan or Korea. A traditional wedding may be the only time in a Vietnamese person's life that a formal tea ceremony is essential. For some families, wine is served instead of tea.

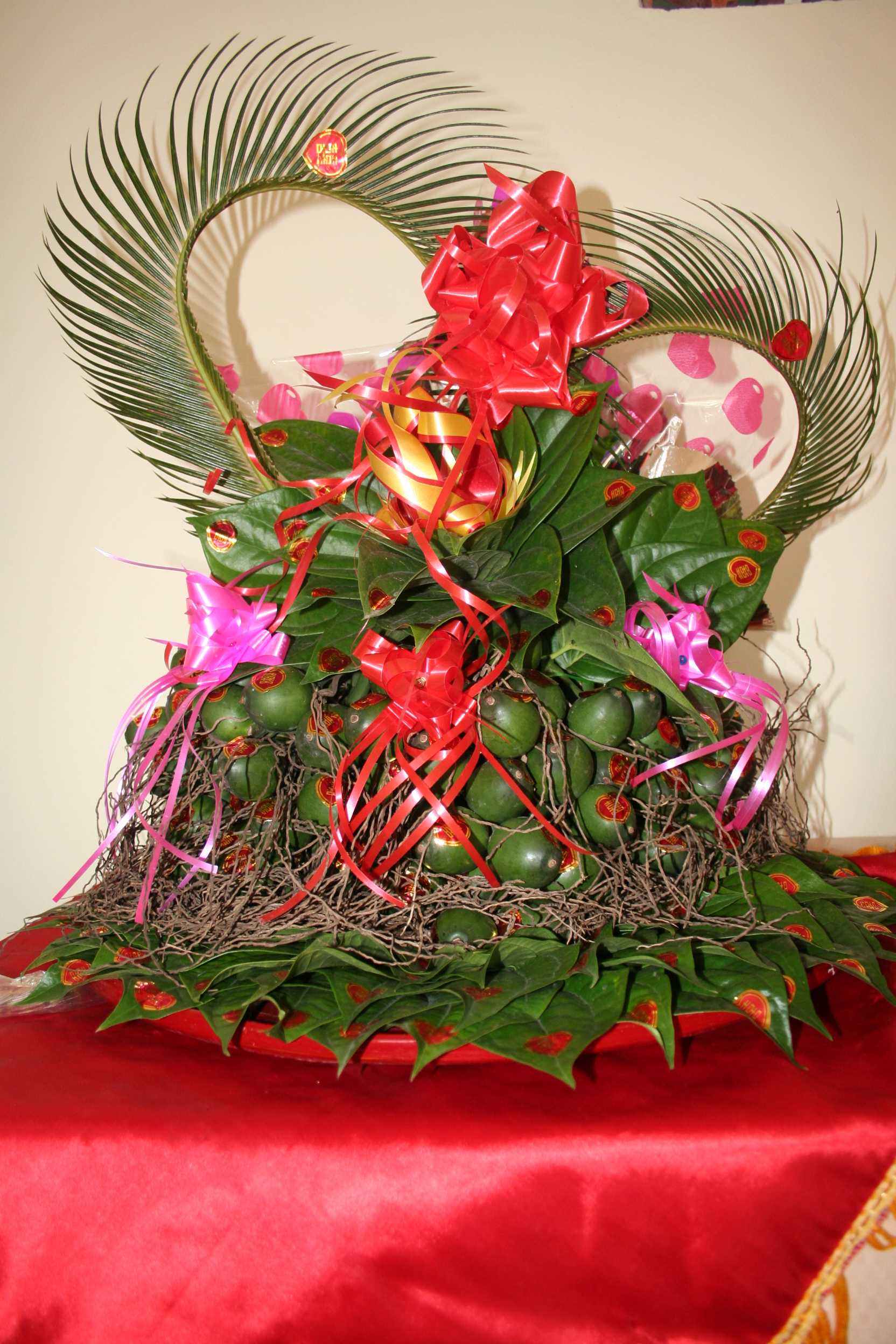
Betel leaf with areca nut as traditional gifts

The bride and groom, in front of all their guests, will turn to their parents. Each parent will then give advice about marriage and family to the couple. A candle ceremony will follow, symbolising the joining of the bride and groom and the joining of the two families. The bride's family will then reveal their gifts to the new couple, which include but are not limited to a pair earrings and at least one kièng. The groom's mother will then put each piece on the bride for good fortune. Rings may be exchanged between the couple. Half of the gifts received by the bride's family will then be returned to the groom's side.

Due to Western influence in the concept of wedding rings, modern weddings still include the giving of jewellery to the bride but are followed by the exchange of wedding bands between the bride and groom. However, some Vietnamese families, especially Catholic ones, will reserve the exchange of wedding bands for the separate ceremony (the church or other Western marriage ceremony).

=== Bringing the Bride to the Groom's House ===
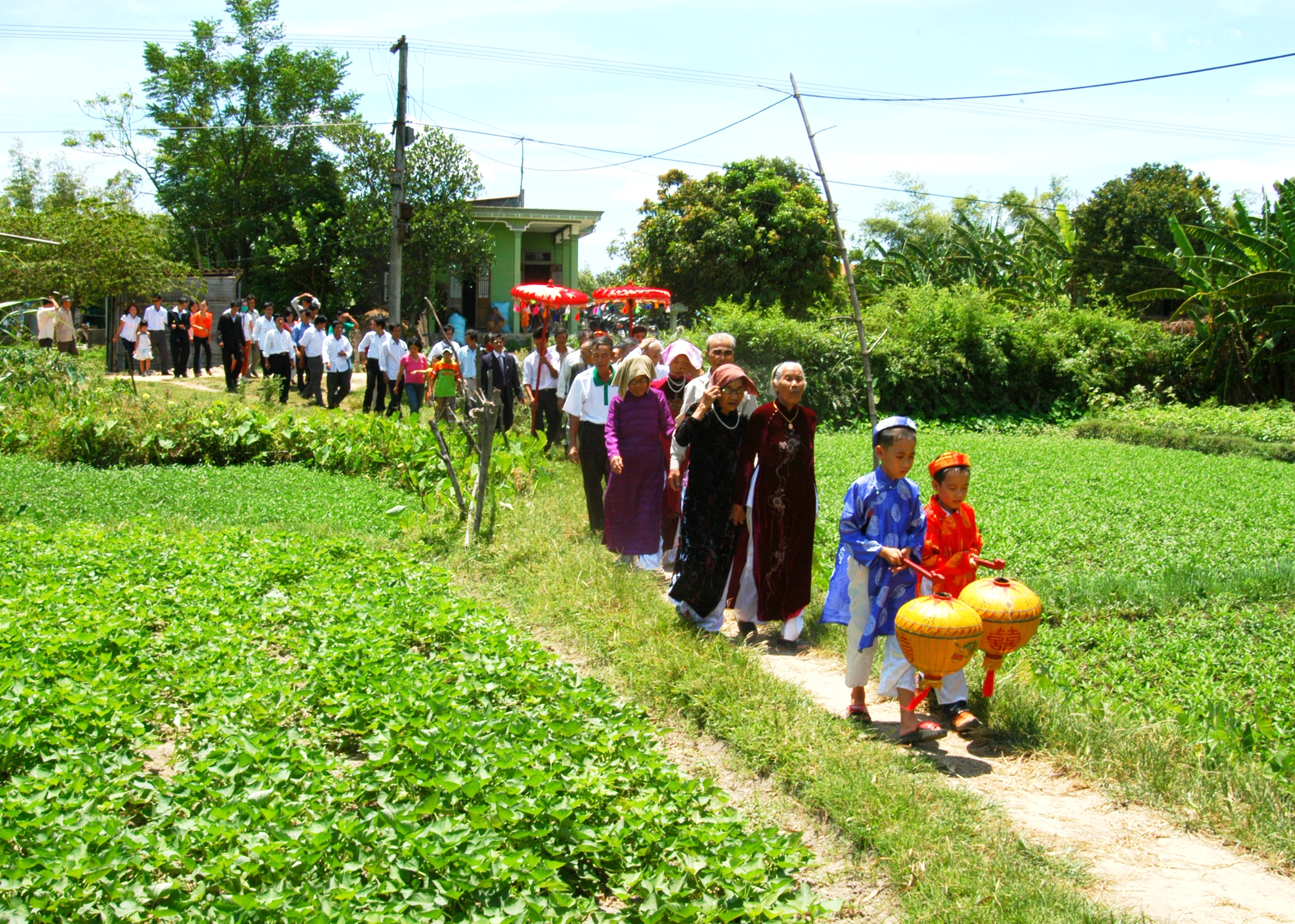
Wedding procession on the countryside

Half of the dowry will be given back to the groom family. This represents the bride's family showing humility and gratefulness for the groom's generosity. If chosen to do so, a reception is held before the next part of the ceremony.

The groom will now bring the bride back to his home. Traditionally, the groom will now lead the procession on a horse, and a litter that contains the bride will follow him. The bride's belongings and the rest of the entourage will follow behind.

As the procession arrives back at the groom's house, the groom's family members that did not take part in the procession but remained at home will light firecrackers in celebration. The newlyweds will be brought to the groom's ancestral altar, where the ceremony before at the bride's house takes place again, this time with the bride before everyone, and she is introduced to the groom's relatives. Finally, the bride is brought to the couple's room and shown their marriage bed.

In more modern times, especially if the groom is not Vietnamese, this part of the ceremony is omitted and replaced with a Western ceremony or straight to the reception instead.

=== The Reception ===
Following the ceremony at the groom's house, all of the bride and groom's family and friends are invited to a reception that traditionally takes place at the groom's house.

Nowadays, however, the reception typically occurs after the procession ceremony to the bride's house, and takes place at any desired location---such as either couple's house, a restaurant, or a hotel banquet hall. It is not until after the reception that the bride is brought to the groom's house, their own established home, or on their way to their honeymoon destination.

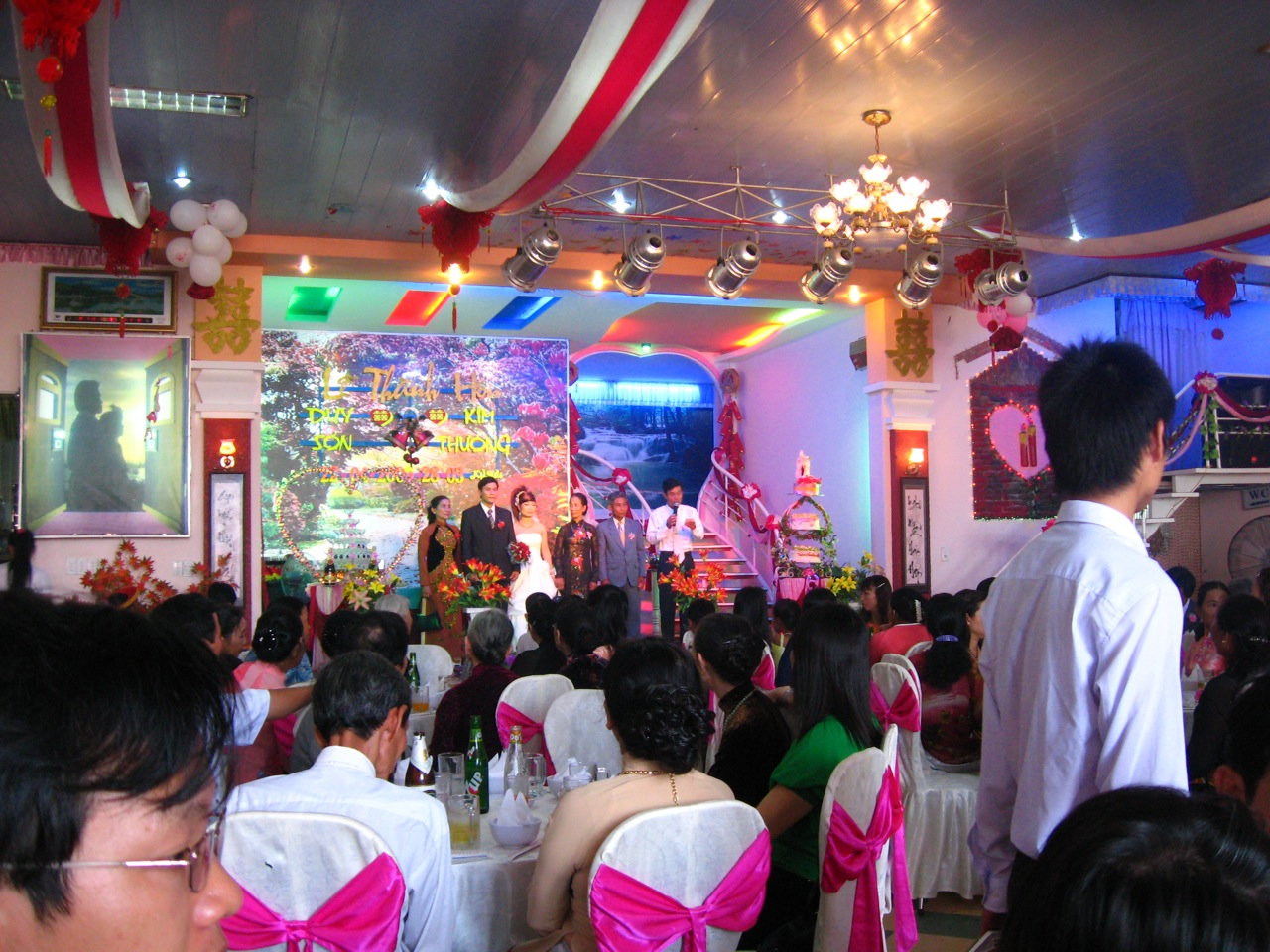
A Vietnamese wedding reception held at a venue.

The number of guests in attendance at these modern-day receptions is often large, usually in the hundreds; extended family members and family friends who may not have attended the events prior are typically invited. Elaborate 7 to 10 course meals are served, often starting with cold platters then followed by hot dishes such as seasoned lobster, seafood hot pot, and other Vietnamese and Chinese banquet dishes. Meals would end with desserts such as hot chè or a fruit platter.

Entertainment, often in the form of singing, is served during the meal, and some receptions allow guests to perform songs for the couple. Western traditions during the event, such as cake cutting and the first dance, may also occur during the reception. The party would end with the guests dancing with the bride and groom, and the wedding cake being served. It was not unusual for the reception to go on as late as dawn.

=== Traditional Vietnamese Wedding Gifts ===
Traditionally, gifting is made in the form of money inside a red envelope or card. This was seen as symbol of prosperity, health, and happiness, and actual gifts were discouraged. The money specifically given at weddings is referred to as "money warding off evil spirits" and is believed to protect the person of younger generations from sickness and death. Immediate family usually gives more money to the bride and groom and many couples use the money to pay for the entire wedding. During the reception, the bride and groom "chào bàn", or table greeting, which is the customary process of going from table to table to personally thank guests for their well wishes and to collect cards and gifts. Usually, each table selects a representative to give a quick congratulatory toast to the bride and groom.

In the US, some couples opt to leave a box at the sign-in table for guests to drop in their gifts, but this is frowned upon by older traditional Vietnamese.

=== The Bride's Change of Dress ===
In modern weddings, brides usually change into at least three different gowns throughout the entire wedding or even during just the reception itself. Besides the wedding Áo dài worn in the wedding ceremony, the dresses usually consist of the Western white wedding gown for the civil or religious ceremony, a second Western dress to be worn at the end of the evening for dancing, and a third traditional Áo dài, though less elaborate yet still formal, to be worn during the traditional table visits.

== Modern infusions in religion and culture ==
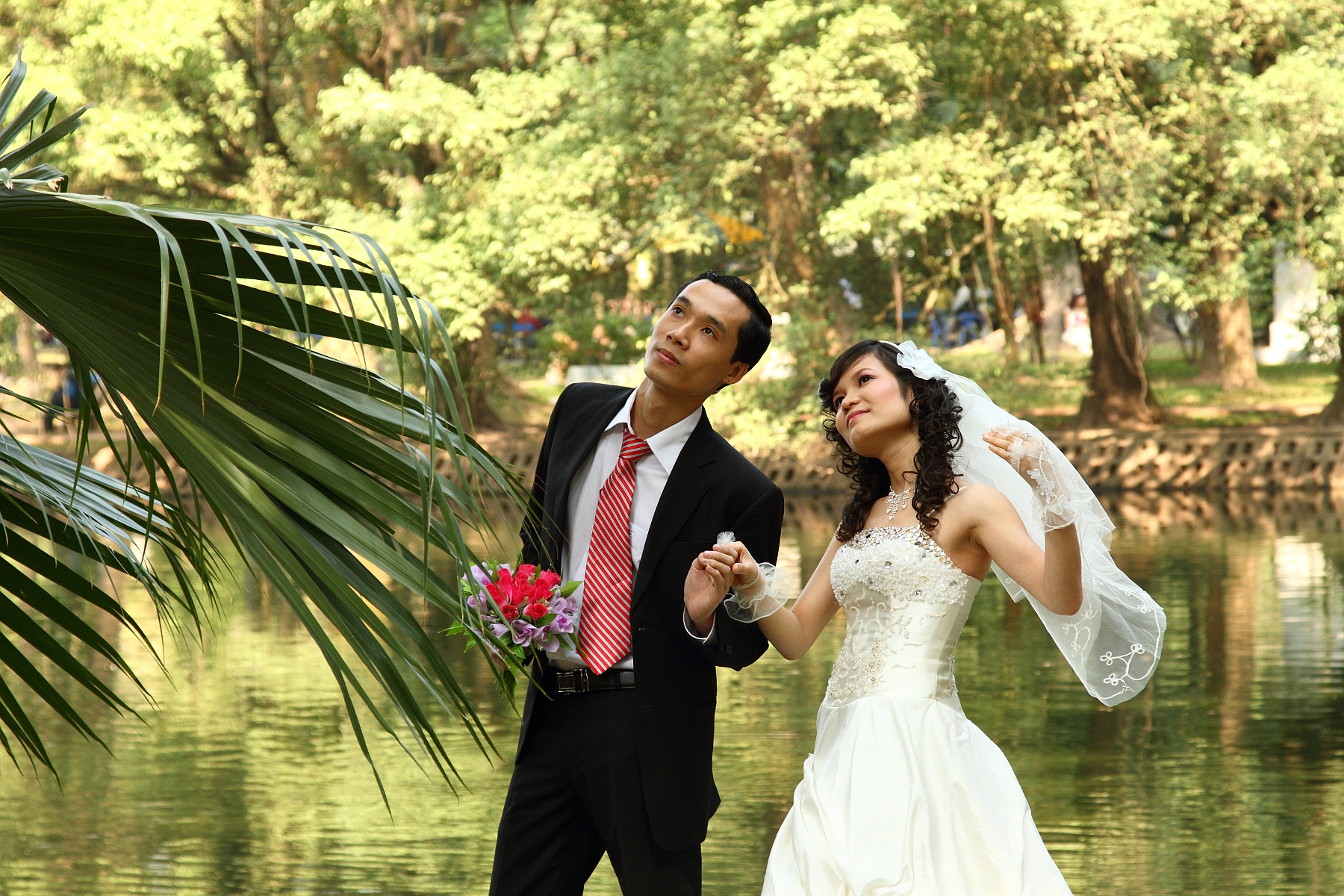
A Vietnamese couple wearing a Western wedding gown and a tuxedo for their wedding.

While most Vietnamese are Mahayana Buddhists, a significant number are Christians, with the majority being Catholic. However, Vietnamese Catholics will still incorporate all parts of the wedding ceremonies and reception. The only difference may lie in the ancestor worship at each newlywed's house; because Catholicism does not condone such worship, this ceremony is often omitted or replaced with worshipping the Christian God or venerating Mary instead. Due to the strong cultural values, this substitution or omission is not always made, however. A church ceremony in addition to the traditional Vietnamese ceremony is required to make the wedding official, and is often done afterwards.

Most current-day Vietnamese weddings—both in Vietnam and overseas—incorporate both Western and Vietnamese traditions. One such infusion is the bride wearing both a Western wedding dress and an áo dài during the wedding and reception. If the marriage is interracial, the Vietnamese bride or groom will also incorporate their spouse's culture by wearing their family's traditional clothing in addition or even merging some of the traditions from the other culture into the wedding ceremony.

Perhaps the most significant Western and Vietnamese infusion is the proceedings of the traditional three ceremonies. With the omitting of the first traditional ceremony ("asking permission to receive the bride"), the last two traditional ceremonies ("receiving bride at her house" and "bringing bride to groom's house") tend to no longer take place on the day of the wedding but instead are used in place of a Western engagement ceremony. Thus, the actual wedding day may only include a religious wedding ceremony in the morning or early afternoon, and large wedding reception in the evening.

== Symbols ==
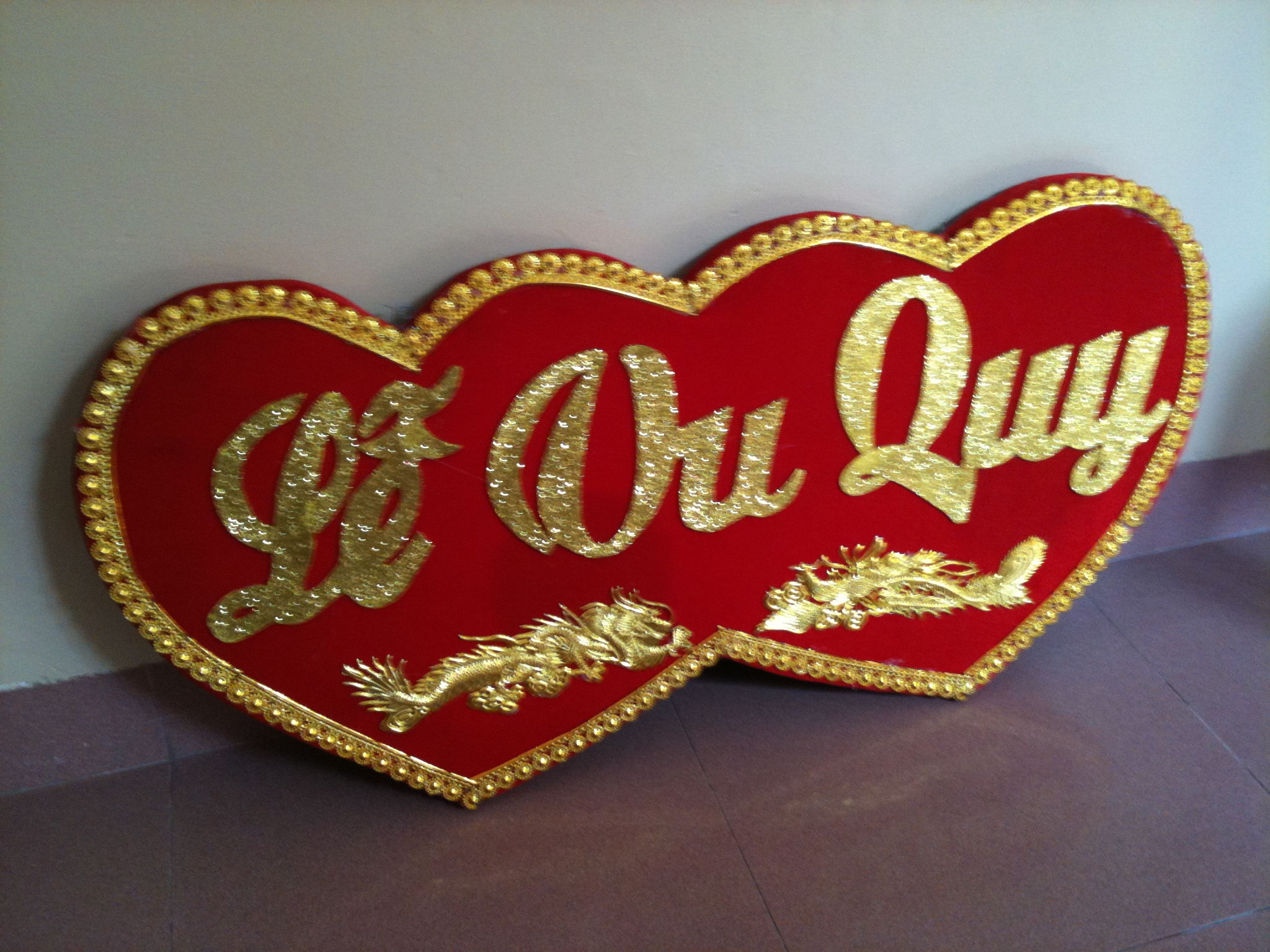
Vietnamese sayings of good fortune and a happy marriage for the couple are seen in many wedding decorations.

Traditional and modern symbols of marriage are often featured during Vietnamese marriage ceremonies as decorations on the wedding umbrellas, lacquer gift boxes (or the red cloth that covers them), or even the decorations in the homes of both the bride and groom. These symbols are to represent luck, fidelity, and happiness for the young couple, among many other things. These symbols and color choices are similar to that of many Asian cultures.

Decorations in the ceremony, from the clothing to the gifts received usually will include lanterns, doves, initials of the couple, among other things. However, one symbol that is indispensable are the words "song hỷ." This phrase also appears as the character 囍, which reflects the influence of Chinese characters. While literacy in these scripts during feudalistic times was restricted mostly to scholars, officials and other members of the elite, characters such as these have always played an aesthetic role in important occasions such as weddings. Words that are written on the décor are often written in cursive, and it was common to display the names of the couple in front of the bride and groom's house to show the community who is getting married.

== See also ==
- Culture of Vietnam
- History of Vietnam
