= Flattened rice =

Type of rice dish

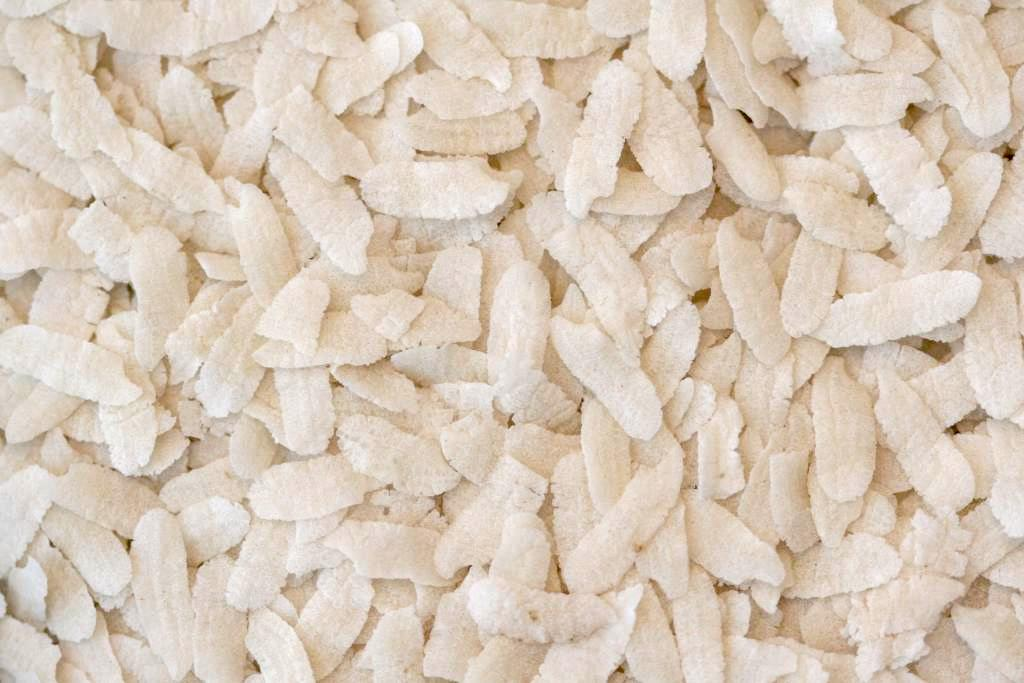
- Region or state: South and Southeast Asia
- Main ingredients: Dehusked rice

Flattened rice is a preparation of rice made from raw, toasted, or parboiled rice grains pounded into flat flakes. It is traditional to many rice-cultivating cultures in Southeast Asia and South Asia. It is also known as rice flakes, beaten rice, pounded rice, pressed rice or chipped rice.

It is toasted, fried, or used as ingredients or toppings for other dishes. Depending on their use and texture, it can be crispy, crunchy, chewy, or soft. Much like oatmeal, the term "flattened rice" and its equivalents in other languages may refer to the ingredient itself or a dish based on the ingredient.

== South Asia ==
Flattened rice is a breakfast staple in South Asia, where it is called chiura, poha, avalakki (Kannada), aval (Tamil, Malayalam), atukulu (Telugu), chuda (Odia), chira (Bengali), chiura/chura (Bhojpuri), sira (Assamese), phovu/fov (Konkani) and other names depending on the local language. Poha is made by dehusking rice grains and then parboiling or soaking them in hot water for 45 minutes. They are then dried, roasted, and flattened with rollers. They usually come in thin, medium, and thick varieties. Thinner varieties are ideal for cooking and dessert use, while thicker varieties are ideal for deep-frying. Poha can be eaten as snacks such as Indori poha, or cooked into various sweet, savory, or spicy dishes. Enthusiasts of the dish, especially in India, celebrate 7 June as International Poha Day.

=== Nepal ===
Flattened rice is called chiura (चिउरा) in Nepali and baji in Newar. It is part of the traditional samay baji platter, and holds an important place in the traditional Newar wedding ceremony. Chiura is usually included in the bride price. After the initial wedding ceremony, the families escort the bride back to the groom's house. During this procession, the pounded rice ceremony occurs. The bride and groom are seated next to one another, and the bride is given the chiura. The groom asks three times for the bride to give him the chiura, each time using a less formal version of the pronoun "you".

== Southeast Asia ==
=== Cambodia ===
Flattened rice is known in Cambodia as ambok (Khmer: អំបុក). It is made by toasting newly harvested rice (with husks on) on a wok, then pounding the heated rice with a large wooden mortar and pestle until flat. The husks are then removed. Ambok plays a very significant role in the Cambodian Water Festival (Bon Om Touk). They are commonly eaten mixed with bananas, palm sugar, and coconut water, or roasted together with small shrimp.

=== Myanmar ===
Flattened rice in Myanmar is known as mont hsan (Burmese: မုန့်ဆန်း). In Lower Myanmar, it is traditionally given as an offering to U Shin Gyi, a guardian nat (spirit) of waterways. Mont hsan is also consumed in Upper Myanmar, and is used as an ingredient in Burmese snacks called mont.

=== Philippines ===
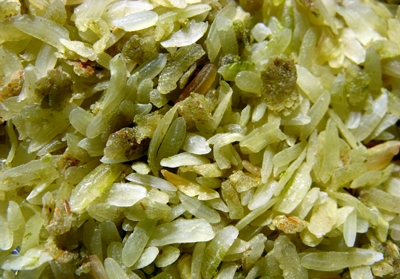
Duman, a variant of pinipig from the Philippines

Flattened rice in the Philippines is called pinipig. It is made using immature glutinous rice that is pounded and toasted. Pinipig is commonly eaten plain, used as toppings in desserts and drinks, or made into cakes.

A notable variant of pinipig, from Pampanga, is duman, which differs in that it is toasted before being pounded. It is celebrated annually in the Duman Festival of Santa Rita, Pampanga.

=== Thailand ===
Flattened rice is known as khao mao (Thai: ข้าวเม่า) in Thailand. Similar to the Philippine variant, it uses immature green glutinous rice. It is made by soaking dehusked rice grains in water for several hours, steaming them in a bamboo container, toasting them in a wok, and then pounding them flat in a mortar with a pestle.

=== Malaysia ===
Across the Malay Peninsula from Perlis bordering Thailand to Perak to Malacca, rice flakes (in Malay: emping padi) is often made with rice grains that has not matured at first harvest (rajau or padi peremping). It is often mixed with grated coconut and sugar into a traditional snack known as ringgi.

Although emping padi have for a long time been often made traditionally as a cottage industry during harvest around November, machines made to mechanise its production have been developed.

Rice flakes were often an item of payment to witchdoctors after a successful harvest following certain rituals done.

=== Vietnam ===
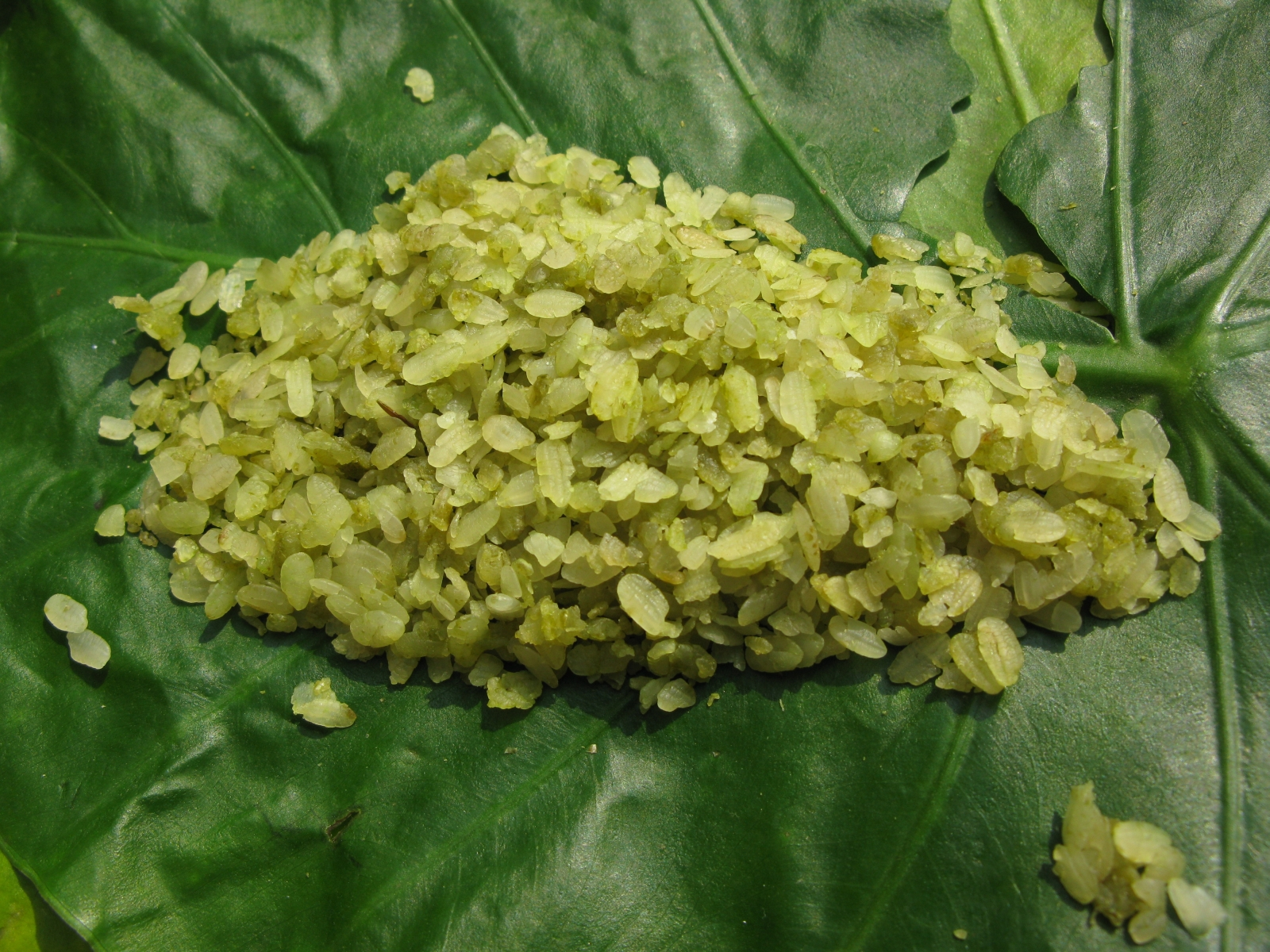
Cốm from Vietnam

Flattened rice in Vietnam is known as cốm. It is made by toasting immature green rice grains over low heat and then pounding them flat in a mortar with a pestle. The husk is removed afterwards via winnowing. It can be eaten plain, used as an ingredient in other dishes, or made into cakes known as bánh cốm. It is commonly eaten during autumn.

== See also ==
- List of rice dishes
- Puffed rice
- Rice Krispies
- Rolled oats
