= Jeeravan Masala =

Indian spice mix

Jeeravan (Hindi: jīrāvana), also spelled Jeerawan or Jeeravan masala, is a spice blend associated particularly with the cuisine of Indore, Madhya Pradesh, India. It is commonly used as a seasoning and taste enhancer, especially with Indori poha. Jeeravan is a blend containing cumin and other spices, although its composition varies between formulations.

== Description ==
Jeeravan is a powdered spice mixture used primarily as a seasoning or finishing spice.

The exact composition of Jeeravan is not uniform. Common ingredients includes dried red chilli, dried mango powder (amchur), coriander, turmeric, black salt, cumin, fennel, dried ginger, cinnamon, cloves, black cardamom, shahi jeera, nutmeg, and asafoetida.

== Culinary use ==
Jeeravan is associated with Indori poha, a popular breakfast and street food of Indore. It is generally sprinkled over prepared poha together with other toppings such as sev and onions.

The spice mixture is also used as a seasoning for salads, chaats and other snacks.

Jeeravan is also used outside Indori poha. Foods including kachori, idli, papad, puri, paratha, fruit and other snacks.

== Regional associations ==
=== Indore ===
Indore is the city most prominently associated with Jeeravan in contemporary food writing.

The spice is also included among foods associated with Indore's culinary culture.

=== Pratapgarh ===
Jeeravan also is associated with Pratapgarh, Rajasthan.

The association with both Indore and Pratapgarh reflect the contemporary production and culinary use of Jeeravan in parts of the Malwa region and neighbouring Rajasthan, rather than establishing a single universally accepted place of origin.

== Geographical indication ==
An application for a geographical indication named Indore Jeeravan is recorded in the Geographical Indications Registry of India.

As of the date of that government document, the application was therefore recorded as being under examination rather than as a granted geographical indication.

== Airport incident ==
In April 2023, Jeerawan attracted national attention after aviation authorities included it among items prohibited in hand baggage at Devi Ahilyabai Holkar International Airport in Indore.

A senior airport official said that the restriction was based on safety norms laid down by the Bureau of Civil Aviation Security. A display at the airport showing prohibited items included a packet of Jeerawan alongside various other objects.

== See also ==
- Indori poha
- Malwa region
- Indian spices
- Chaat masala
- Garam masala
