= Ringgi (food) =

Malay dish with sugar and grated coconut

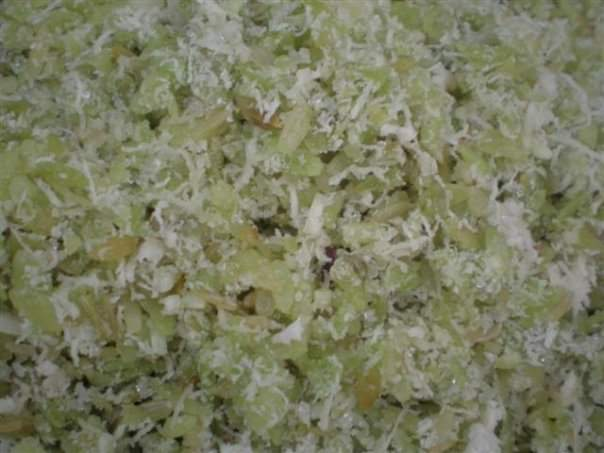
- Type: Snack
- Place of origin: Malaysia
- Region or state: Perlis
- Created by: Malay
- Main ingredients: rice flakes

Ringgi (Jawi: ريڠڬي) is a traditional snack unique to the northern Malaysian state of Perlis made of rice flakes mixed with sugar and grated coconut. It is sometimes eaten with buffalo milk.

== See also ==
- Cuisine of Malaysia
