= Indori poha =

Indian Food dish made from flattened rice

Poha Jalebi
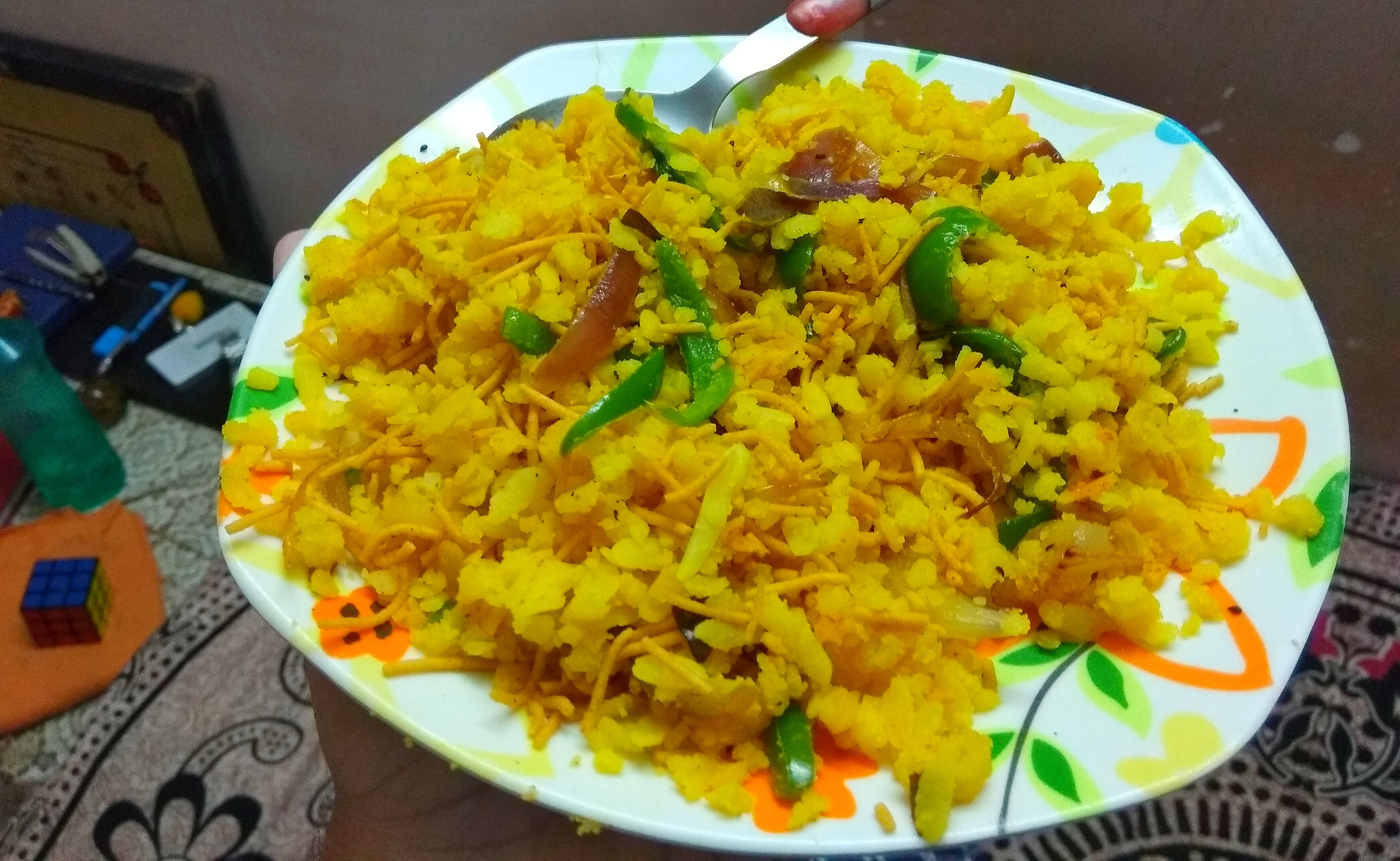
- Alternative names: Indori Pohe-Jalebi (with Jalebi)
- Course: Snack
- Place of origin: India
- Region or state: Madhya Pradesh, Maharashtra, Uttar Pradesh
- Main ingredients: rice, chilies, onions, lemon, peanut, mustard seed and cumin seeds, curry leaves

Indori poha (poha of Indore) is a flattened rice snack that is likely to have originated in the Indian metropolis of Indore. It contains steamed poha (flattened rice) and is usually served with a unique combination of jalebi (called poha-jalebi combined), sev, usal, sliced onions, fennel seeds and sprinkle of Jeeravan Masala on top of it.

Unlike the other varieties of Poha found across India, Indori Poha is cooked in steam instead of being cooked directly with other ingredients. This provides Indori Poha its distinct taste, softness, and flavor. Indori poha is sweeter in taste compared to other variaties of Poha. Vendors generally prefer peas instead of peanuts, in contrast to typical Indian poha dishes. Indori poha is generally served with jalebi.

Once cooked, the dish is traditionally garnished with fresh coriander, chopped onions, and a generous topping of spicy, crispy Ratlami sev, and Jeeravan Masala. The contrast between the soft, steamed poha and the crunchy sev significantly enhances both the texture and the overall flavor profile.

== History ==
Indori poha gets its name from the city of Indore which is its place of origin. It is believed that it was created after India's independence (1947). The recipe of Indori poha differs from vendor to vendor, though generally, it comes with a blend of North and Central Indian spices, snacks and namkeen.

Indori poha is mainly sold by vendors all around the city during the morning time, often alongside the city's other popular snacks "kachori-samosas". It is also available in nearby cities Ujjain, Dewas, Sagar, Dhar, Ratlam and Bhopal and is becoming a very popular dish in Maharashtra, Gujarat, Uttar Pradesh and Bihar.
