= Áo nhật bình =

Vietnamese court dress

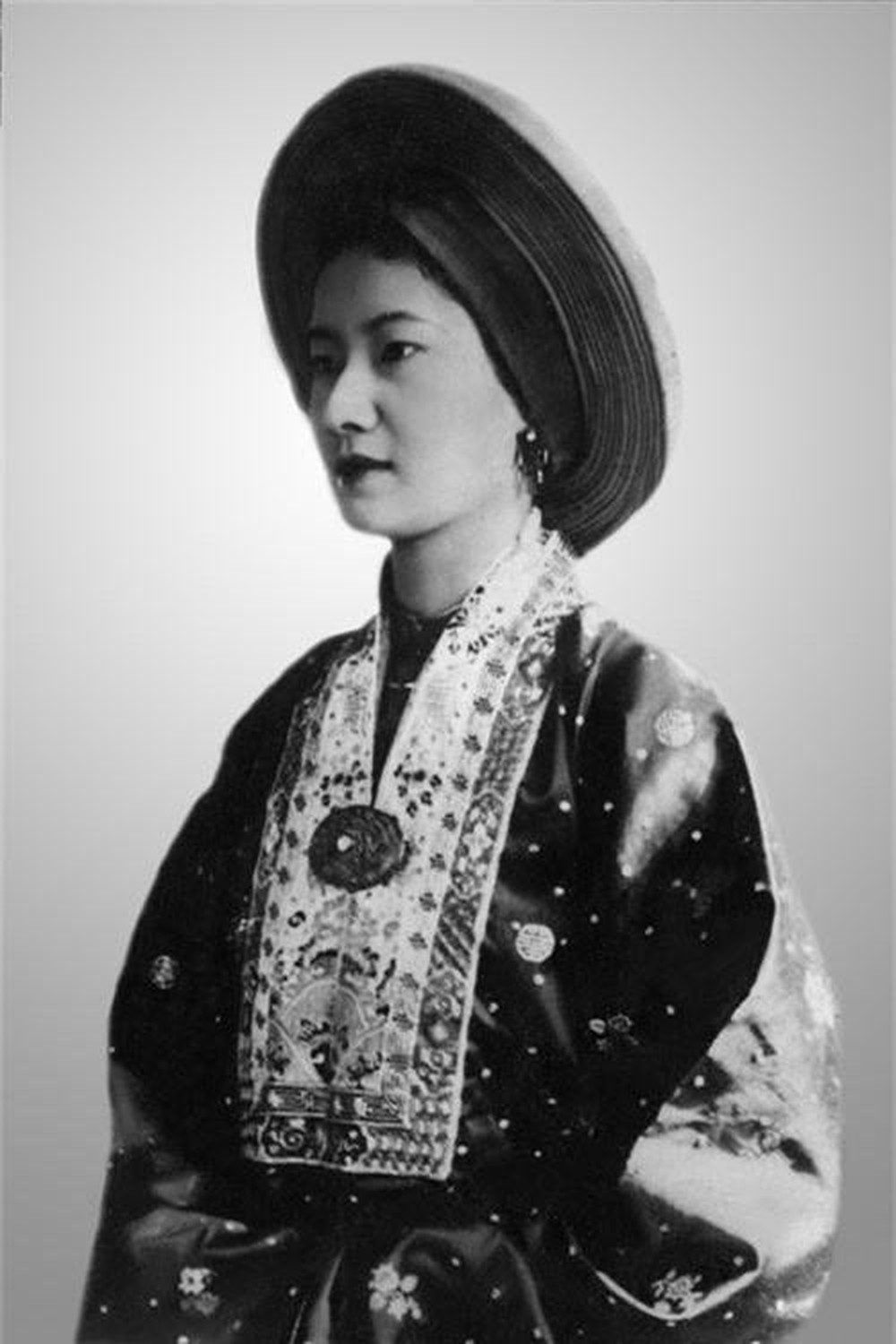
Empress Nam Phương wearing a nhật bình robe along with a turban.

Áo nhật bình was a Vietnamese court dress worn by female members of the royal family and aristocratic women during the Nguyễn dynasty (1802–1945). It served as ceremonial attire for occasions such as the Tết festival, weddings, and court audiences, symbolizing status and authority through its distinctive rectangular collar and intricate motifs.

== History ==
The áo nhật bình originated during the era of the Nguyễn lords in Đàng Trong and was formalized under the Nguyễn dynasty. It was based on the Ming dynasty robe, Zhiling Pifeng (simplified Chinese: 直领披风; traditional Chinese: 直領披風; pinyin: zhílǐng pīfēng). However, the áo nhật bình bares Qing dynasty motifs such as lishui. The Vietnamese garment derives its name from "nhật" (日) and "bình" (平), referring to the collar's shaped design. Emperors Gia Long and Minh Mạng established regulations on colors, patterns, and materials based on rank. It was documented in official regulations such as the Khâm định Đại Nam hội điển sự lệ (欽定大南會典事例).

During the reign of Đồng Khánh, regulations were simplified, replacing elaborate hats with scarves and reducing accessories.

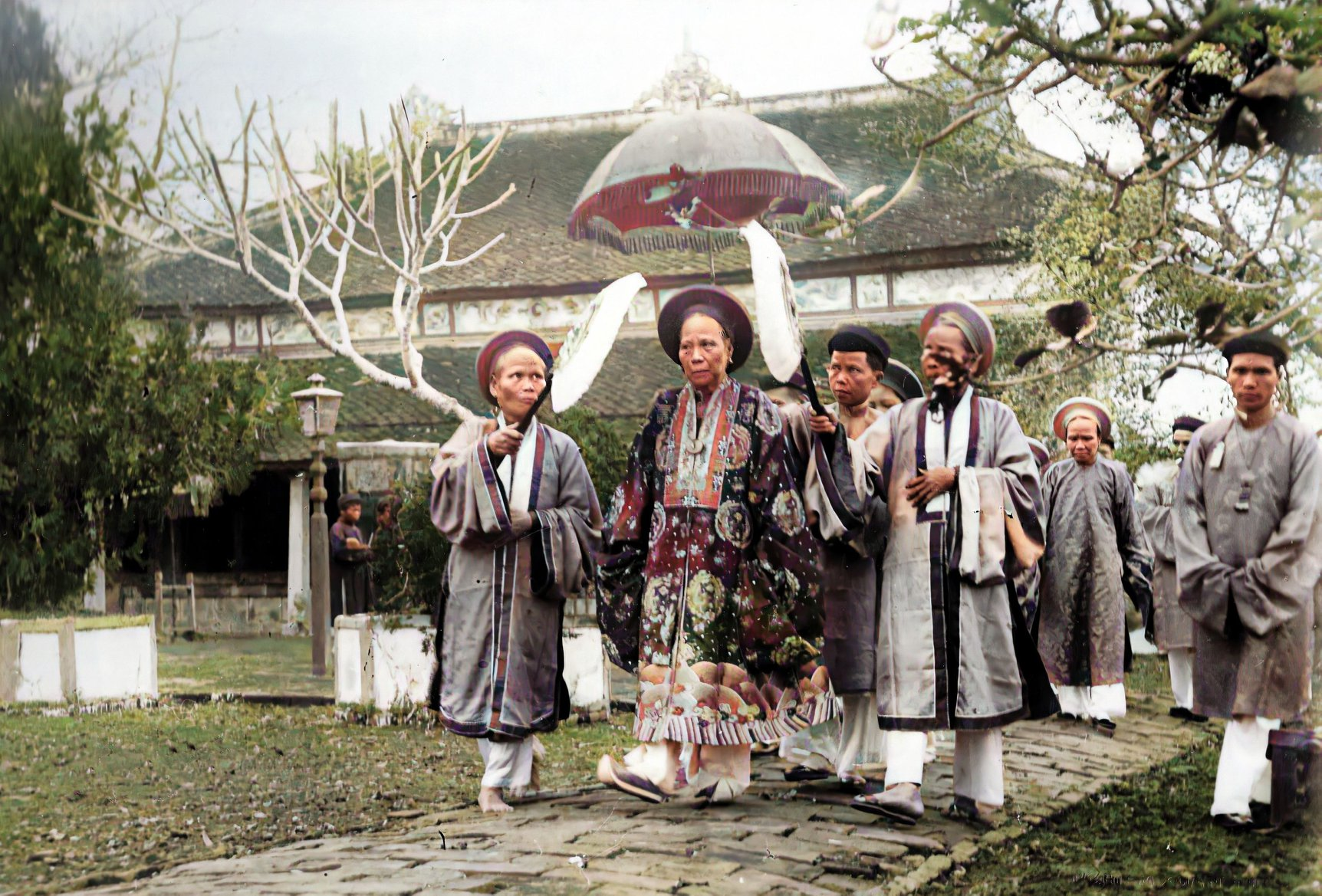
Dương Thị Thục visiting the ancestral temple of Nguyễn dynasty. She and her servants can be seen wearing an áo nhật bình.

== Design ==
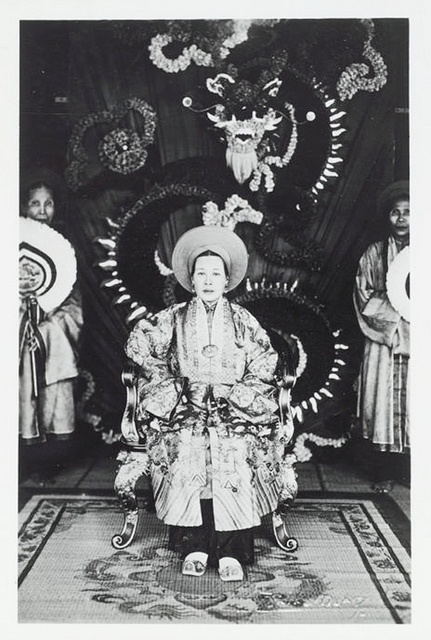
Empress Dowager Từ Cung wearing a nhật bình robe

The garment features a loose fit with long sleeves, two front panels, and a large rectangular collar edged in contrasting fabric. Motifs include phoenixes, lotuses, clouds, and the eight treasures, embroidered on silk, brocade, or satin in colors like gold, red, blue, and purple.

Rank-specific variations:

- Empress: Gold with dragons and phoenixes, paired with a nine-phoenix hat and eight gold hairpins.
- Princess: Red with seven-phoenix hat and twelve floral hairpins.
- Concubines: Varying colors like peach, purple, with corresponding hats and hairpins.

It was worn with white trousers or skirts, scarves, and embroidered shoes.

The regulations on the attire of palace consorts:

又奉頒賞左右宮嬪冠服：
二階宮嬪：五鳳金約髮一，花簪十，赤桃綫紗織團鸞日平衣一，白八絲織團鸞裳一。
三階宮嬪：三鳳金約髮一，花簪八，正紫色綫紗織團鳳日平衣一，白八絲織團鸞裳一。
四階宮嬪：一鳳金約髮一，花簪八，淡紫色綫紗織團鸞日平衣一，白八絲織鸞裳一。

Hựu phụng ban thưởng tả hữu cung tần quan phục:

Nhị giai cung tần: Ngũ phượng kim ước phát, hoa trâm thập, xích đào tuyến sa chức đoàn loan nhật bình y nhất, bạch bát ty chức đoàn loan thường nhất.

Tam giai cung tần: Tam phượng kim ước phát nhất, hoa trâm bát, chính tử sắc tuyến sa chức đoàn loan nhật bình y nhất, bạch bát ty chức đoàn loan thường nhất.

Tứ giai cung tần: Nhất phượng kim ước phát nhất, hoa trâm bát, đạm tử sắc tuyến sa chức đoàn loan nhật bình y nhất, bạch bát ty chức loan thường nhất.

Furthermore, court headdresses and garments were be bestowed upon the palace consorts on the left and right, according to rank:

Second-rank palace consorts: one five-phoenix crown; one gold hair clasp; ten floral hairpins; one nhật bình robe of peach-red gauze woven with silk thread and decorated with a round luan-bird motifs; and one white skirt made of eight-strand silk, woven with a round luan-bird motifs.

Third-rank palace consorts: one three-phoenix crown; one gold hair clasp; eight floral hairpins; one nhật bình robe of deep purple gauze woven with silk thread and decorated with a round phoenix motifs; and one white skirt made of eight-strand silk, woven with a round luan-bird motifs.

Fourth-rank palace consorts: one one-phoenix crown; one gold hair clasp; eight floral hairpins; one nhật bình robe of pale purple gauze woven with silk thread and decorated with a round luan-bird motifs; and one white skirt made of eight-strand silk, woven with a luan-bird motifs.

— Khâm định Đại Nam hội điển sự lệ 欽定大南會典事例, volume 78 卷七十八 (quan phục 冠服)

== Preservation and modern use ==
Artifacts have been preserved and donated to museums in Huế, including those from Nam Phương and princesses. In 2022, Thừa Thiên Huế received two Nguyễn dynasty áo nhật bình from a private collector.

Today, it is reconstructed for festivals, performances, historical films, and weddings. Modern adaptations include knitted versions and wayward designs in fashion.
