= Kiềng =

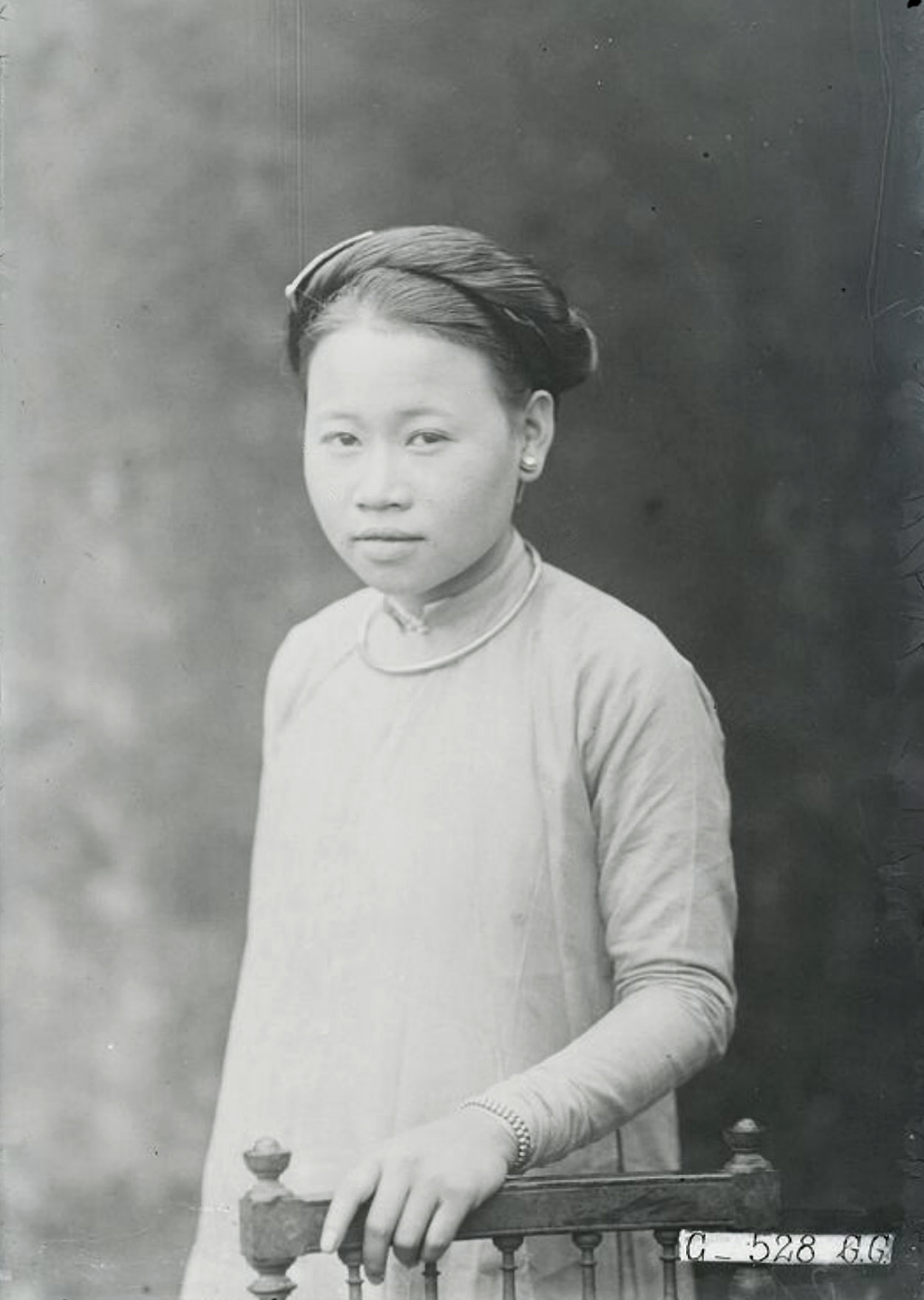
- A Vietnamese woman in Huế (1920), wearing a kiềng.
- Vietnamese alphabet: kiềng
- Chữ Nôm: 𨪝

A kiềng is a type of traditional jewellery worn in Vietnam.

== Background ==
A kiềng is a traditional necklace typically made out of gold. It is mainly worn by women. A kiềng is often worn on special occasions such as weddings, festivals, or other important ceremonies. They hold significant culture value as it acts a symbol of prosperity and status. Such as the case with Ngọc Ánh in Hanoi, she wore ten kiềng necklaces during her wedding.

Some kiềng necklaces may also have intricate designs and patterns. These designs may also include floral patterns.

== Gallery ==
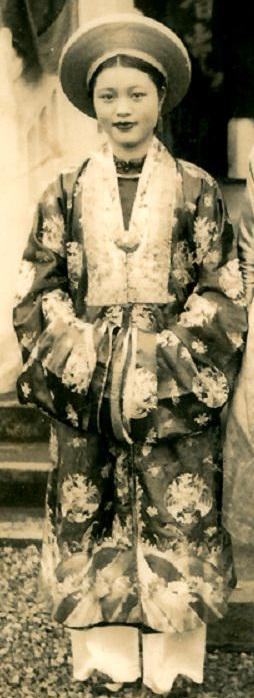
Vietnamese woman wearing an áo Nhật bình with a kiềng for her wedding.

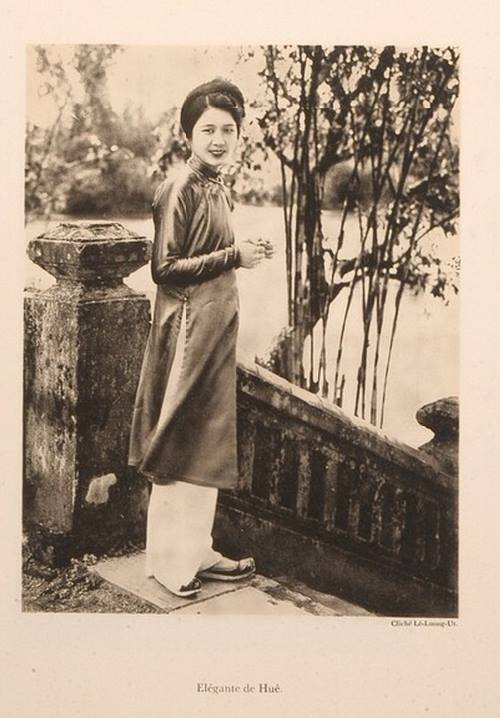
Woman in the 1950s wearing an áo dài with a kiềng.

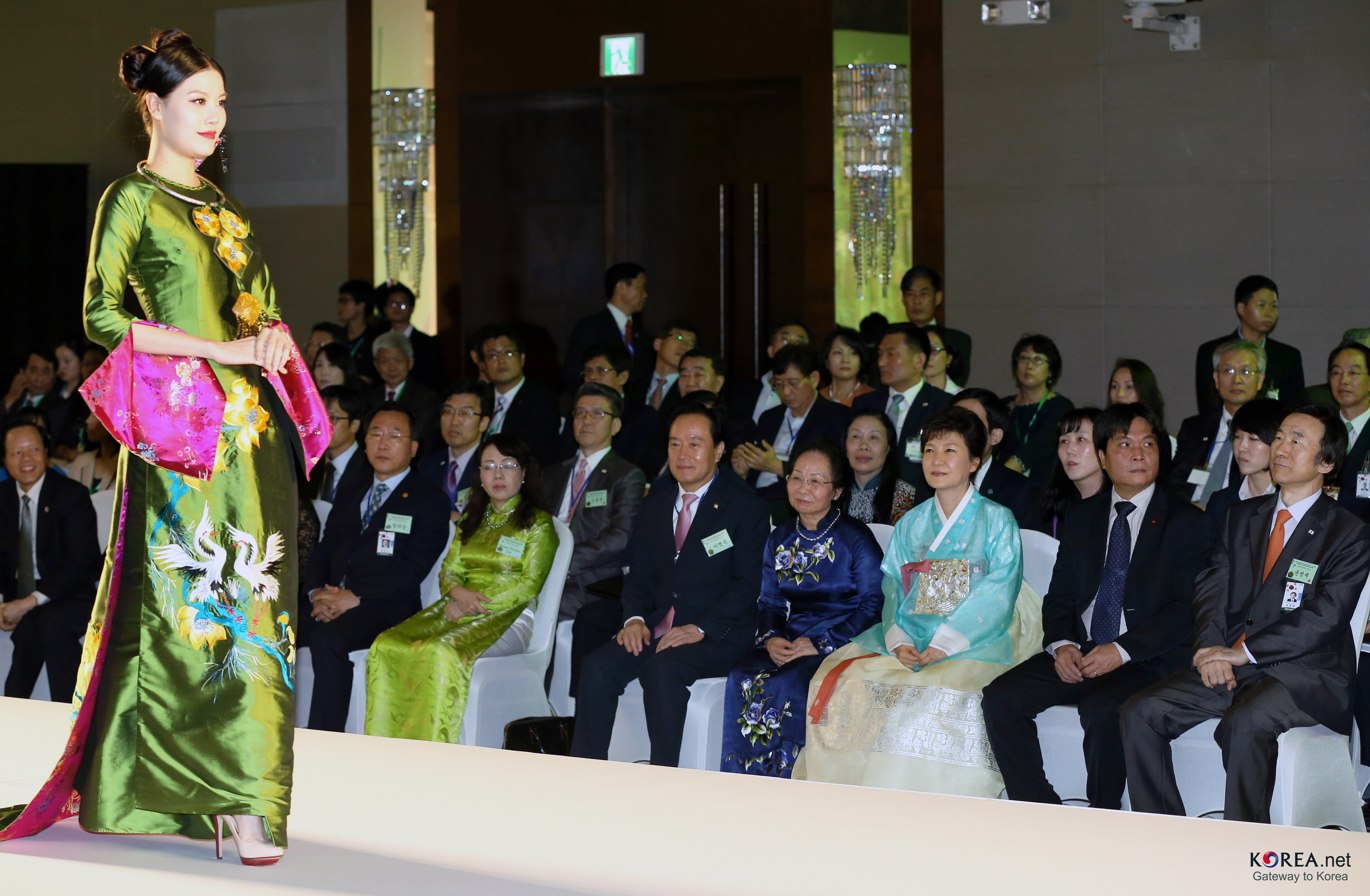
Woman in a fashion show wearing a kiềng.

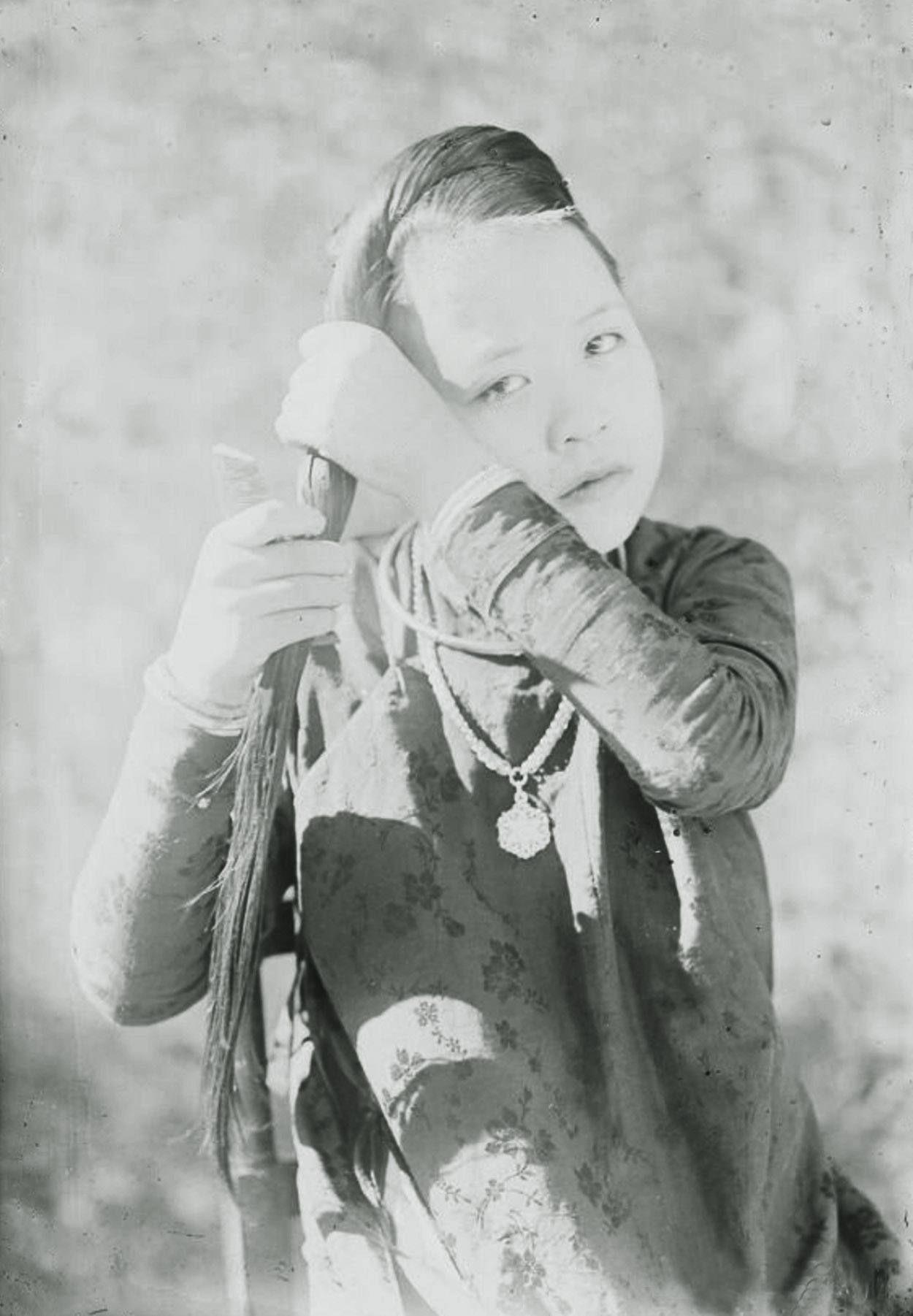
Woman tying her hair up. She is seen wearing a kiềng.

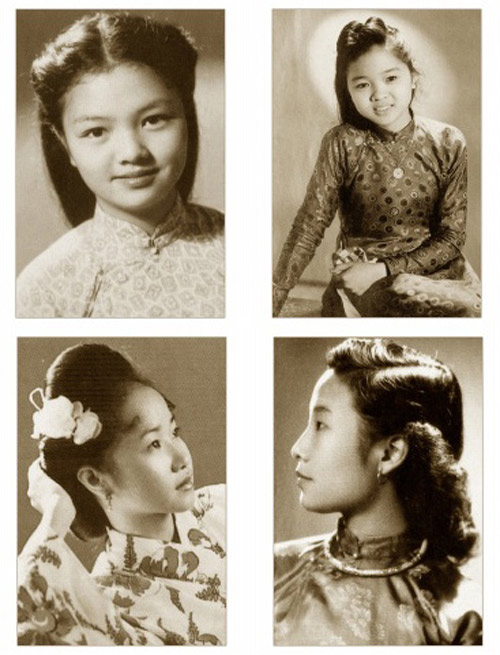
Vintage hairstyles of Hanoian ladies (1950). The woman on the bottom right is wearing a kiềng.

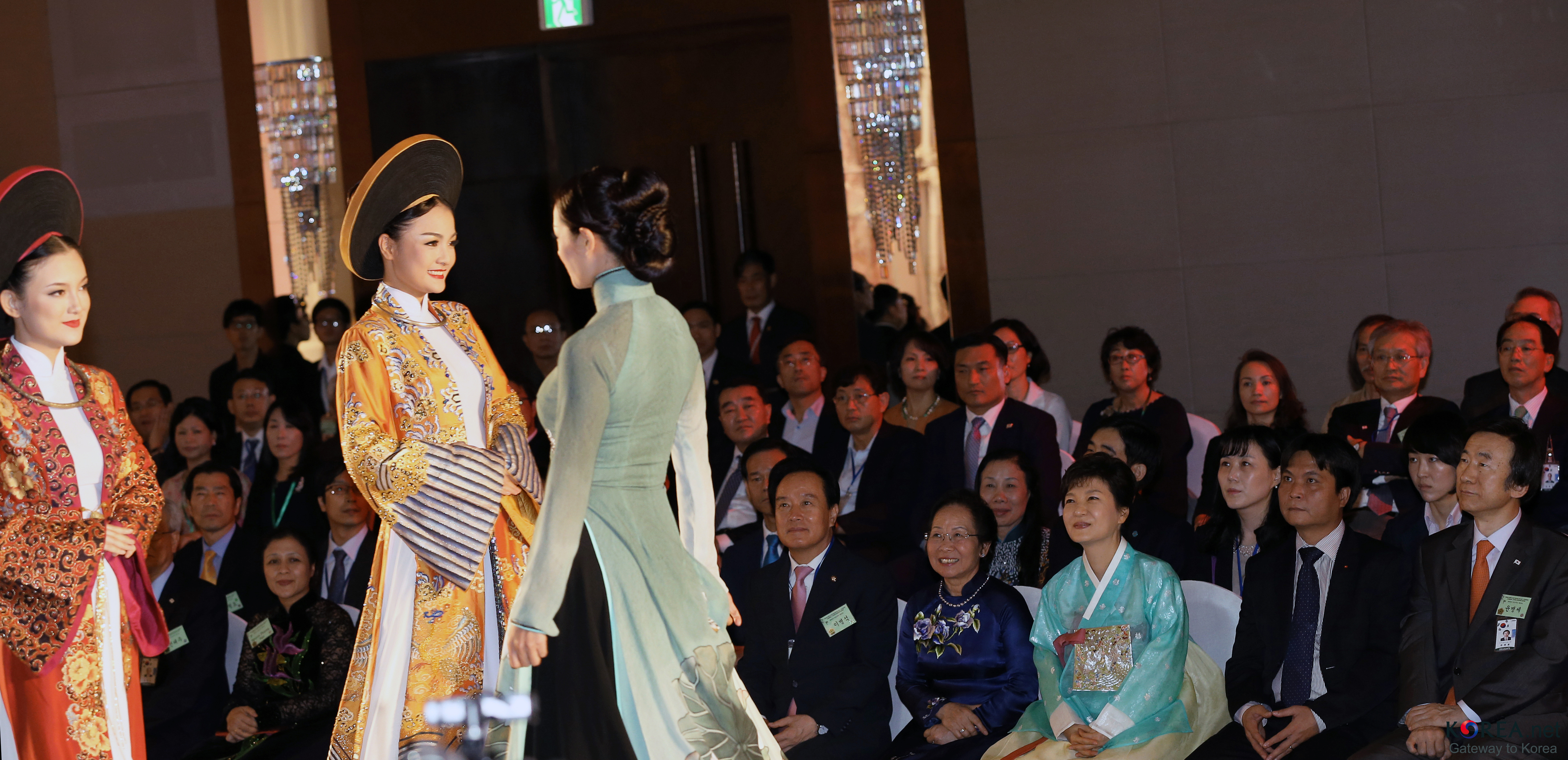
The two women that are wearing the áo dài are both wearing a kiềng.
