= Bánh cốm =

Vietnamese dessert

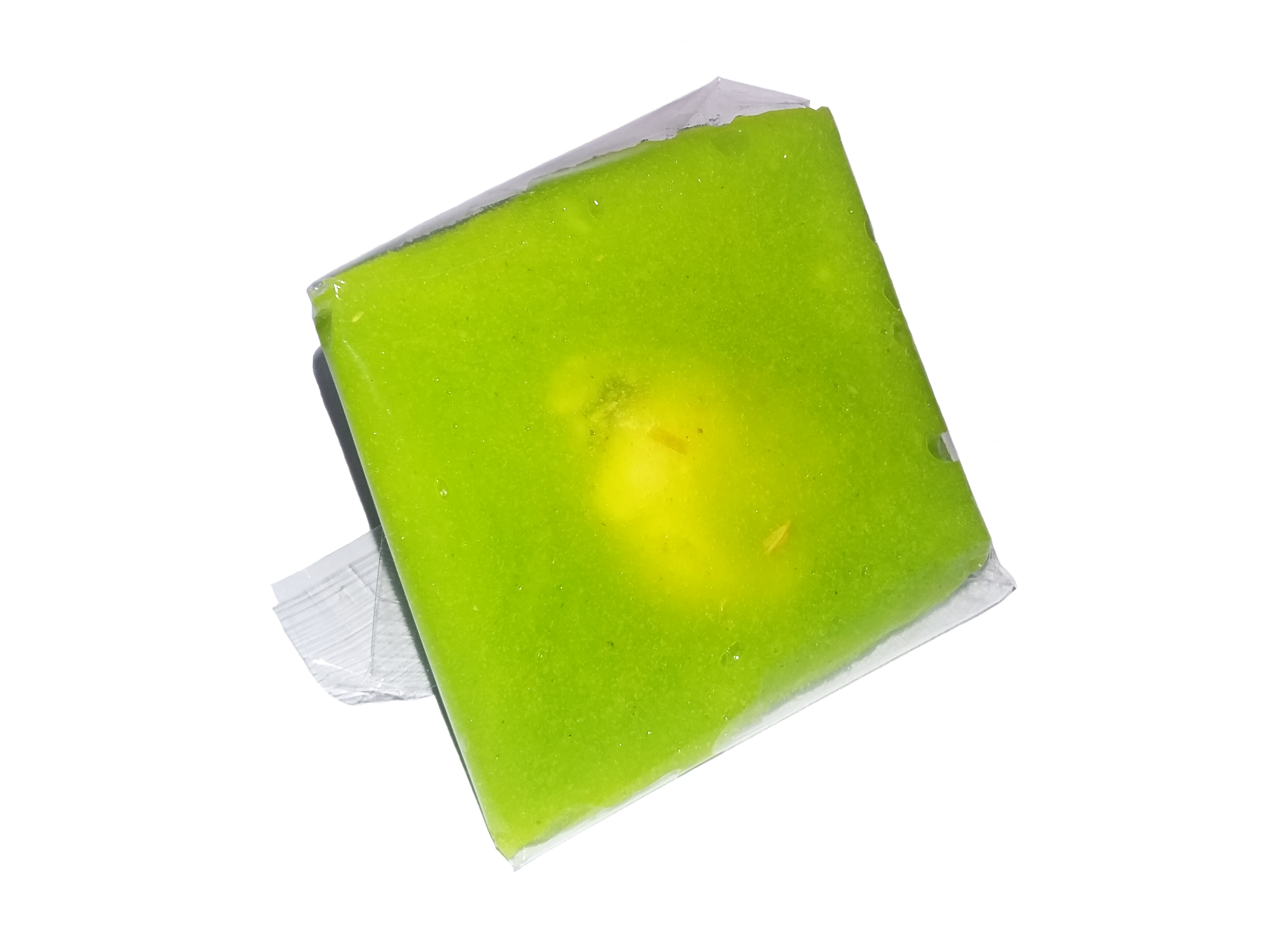
- Bánh cốm from Hanoi
- Alternative names: Green rice cake
- Type: Dessert
- Place of origin: Vietnam
- Region or state: Hanoi
- Serving temperature: Room temperature
- Main ingredients: Glutinous rice, mung bean, sugar

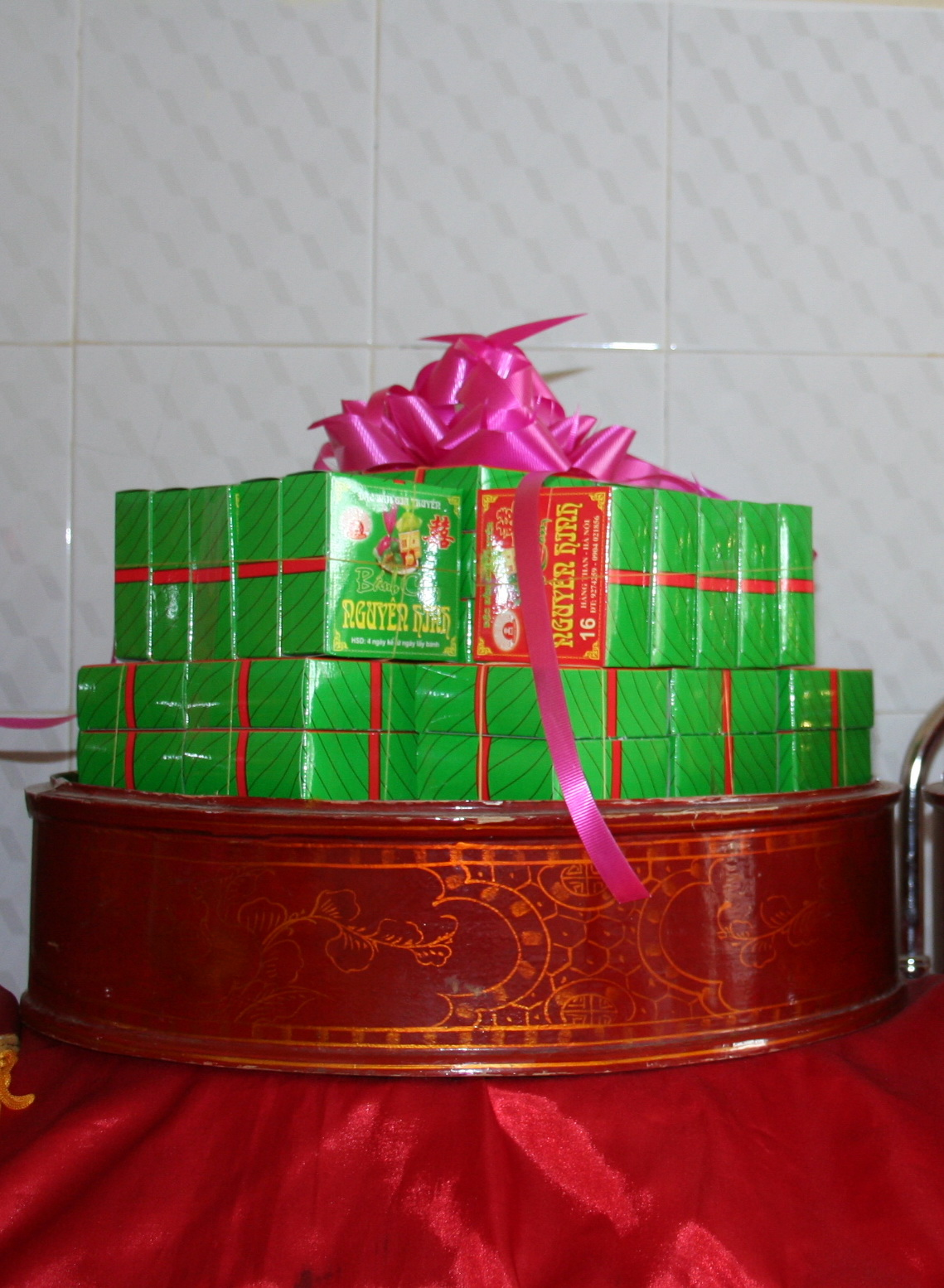
Bánh cốm is a traditional wedding gift in Vietnam

Bánh cốm is a Vietnamese dessert made from rice and mung bean. It is made by wrapping pounded and then green-coloured glutinous rice around sugary green-bean paste.

== See also ==
- List of desserts
