= Rational Dress Society =

19th-century British organization

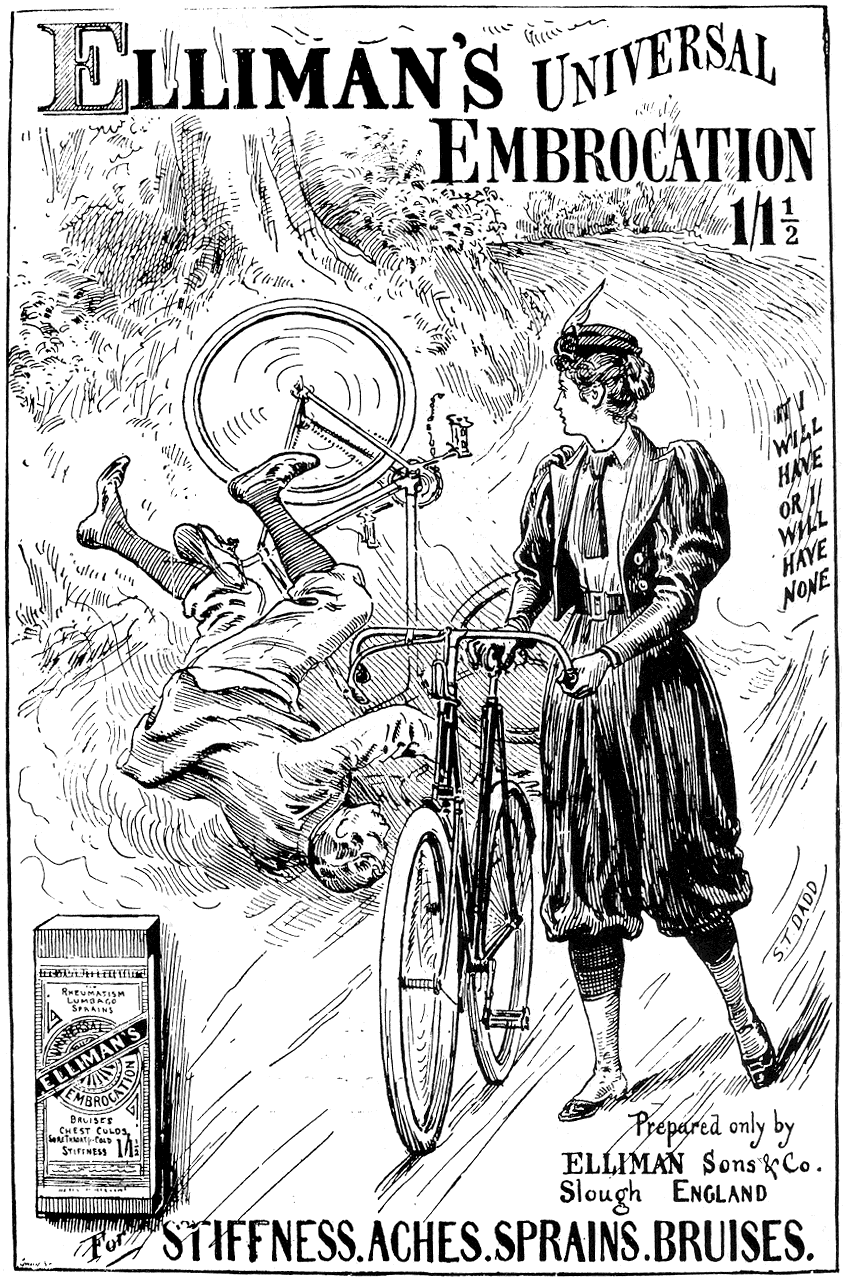
1897 advertisement in The Graphic for Elliman's Universal Embrocation (manufactured in Slough), showing a relatively early example of an ordinary non-sea-bathing Western woman appearing skirtless in public (wearing "rationals" or "knickerbockers" or "bloomers" for bicycle-riding). The whole outfit (top and bottom) was known as a "bicycle suit".

The Rational Dress Society was an organisation founded in 1881 in London, part of the movement for Victorian dress reform. It described its purpose thus:

The Rational Dress Society protests against the introduction of any fashion in dress that either deforms the figure, impedes the movements of the body, or in any way tends to injure the health. It protests against the wearing of tightly-fitting corsets; of high-heeled shoes; of heavily-weighted skirts, as rendering healthy exercise almost impossible; and of all tie down cloaks or other garments impeding on the movements of the arms. It protests against crinolines or crinolettes of any kind as ugly and deforming... [It] requires all to be dressed healthily, comfortably, and beautifully, to seek what conduces to birth, comfort and beauty in our dress as a duty to ourselves and each other.

In the catalogue of its inaugural exhibition, it listed the attributes of "perfect" dress as:

1. Freedom of Movement.
2. Absence of pressure over any part of the body.
3. Not more weight than is necessary for warmth, and both weight and warmth evenly distributed.
4. Grace and beauty combined with comfort and convenience.
5. Not departing too conspicuously from the ordinary dress of the time.

Leading members of the Society were Lady Harberton (who created the divided skirt), Mary Eliza Haweis and Constance Wilde (Irish author). Oscar Wilde helped spread the word by publishing the essay "The Philosophy of Dress" in which he stressed the important relationship between clothing and one's soul. Woman cyclists, such as members of the Lady Cyclists' Association, were keen advocates of women's right to dress appropriately for the activity, as part of a belief that cycling offered women an opportunity to escape overly restrictive societal norms.

In 1889, a member of the Rational Dress Society, Charlotte Carmichael Stopes, stunned the proceedings of a meeting of the British Association for the Advancement of Science in Newcastle upon Tyne by organizing an impromptu session where she introduced rational dress to a wide audience, her speech being noted in newspapers across Britain.

== See also ==
- Artistic Dress movement
- Bicycling and feminism
- Corset controversy
- National Dress Reform Association
- Svenska drägtreformföreningen
