= Sarah Maddock =

Australian cyclist

Sarah and her husband Ernest Alfred Maddock c 1894

Sarah Maddock (1860–1955) was an Australian endurance cyclist during the 1890s and early 1900s and the first woman to ride a bicycle from Sydney to Melbourne and later Sydney to Brisbane and back.

== Early life ==
Born Sarah Porter on 29 October 1860 near Wolumla, Eden, New South Wales, to James and Mary Porter, Sarah Maddock grew up on her parents' dairy farm and became a competent horsewoman. A childhood accident left her blind in one eye. She married her husband Ernest Alfred Maddock on 22 February 1886 at St James' Church, Sydney and by 1890 had a son and three daughters, of whom two survived. As was custom at the time she was also known as Mrs E.A. Maddock, after her husband.

== Women's cycling ==
Women riding bicycles was still contentious in Australia at the time that Maddock learned to ride. Her ride from Sydney to Melbourne was instrumental in helping change attitudes to women's cycling in Australia as while considered an adventurous ride, she took great care to conform to general ideas about middle-class femininity, and this combined with her professed rejection of 'scorching' or 'rational dress' helped to reassure those who worried about the effect of riding on women. Maddock has been credited with creating "a radically new understanding of femininity".

== Cycling career ==
Maddock learned to ride a bicycle in 1893. In 1894 she was the first woman to ride from Sydney to Melbourne, a distance of 924 km by the route she took. Accompanied by her husband and monitored by local cycling clubs along the route, the trip took nine days and she was escorted into Melbourne by members of the Melbourne Bicycle Club.

Maddock was made an honorary member of the Melbourne Bicycle Club on the evening of her arrival into Melbourne. The MBC did not normally allow women members.

Sarah Maddock completed a 1575 km round trip to Brisbane from Sydney in 1895 riding an imported New Rapid bicycle which she collected the day before embarking on the ride. Again accompanied by her husband, the pair encountered poor roads, bushfires, tropical downpours and fjorded creeks to complete the journey. On returning to Sydney she was presented with a gold medal by the Sydney Bicycle Club.

In February 1895 she became the captain of the newly formed Sydney Ladies' Bicycle Club.

In 1897 she formed a second women's club in Sydney, the Stanmore Lady Wheelers, of which she became Captain.

In 1898 Maddock completed the first Century Ride in NSW.

Maddock wrote the Ladies Page for the Cycling Gazette in NSW.

== Rational dress ==
Unlike some other female endurance riders of the time Sarah Maddock rejected "rational dress" for cycling. She claimed that the most suitable cycling costume for a woman was a skirt, worn with 'black satin under knickerbockers', which allowed it to 'fall gracefully into place after each stroke of the knee'. While recognising the 'extreme folly and danger of riding tightly dressed about the waist', she advised that 'stays should by no means be discarded'.

There are however conflicting reports about her dress with some accounts claiming she sometimes wore rational dress in remote areas and carried a skirt to wear in more populous areas. She was at pains to refute this.

== Bicycles ==
Maddock's first Sydney to Melbourne ride was undertaken on a 14 kg Galatea Conqueror safety bicyclee with dropped frame, gearbox and pneumatic tyres. For the ride from Sydney to Brisbane and back she rode an imported New Rapid machine with pneumatic tyres.

== Death ==
In 1955, at 95, Sarah Maddock died at her daughter's house in Double Bay, Sydney. She was cremated with Anglican rites; her son and two daughters survived her.
