= Victorian dress reform =

Victorian era design movement favouring practical women's clothing

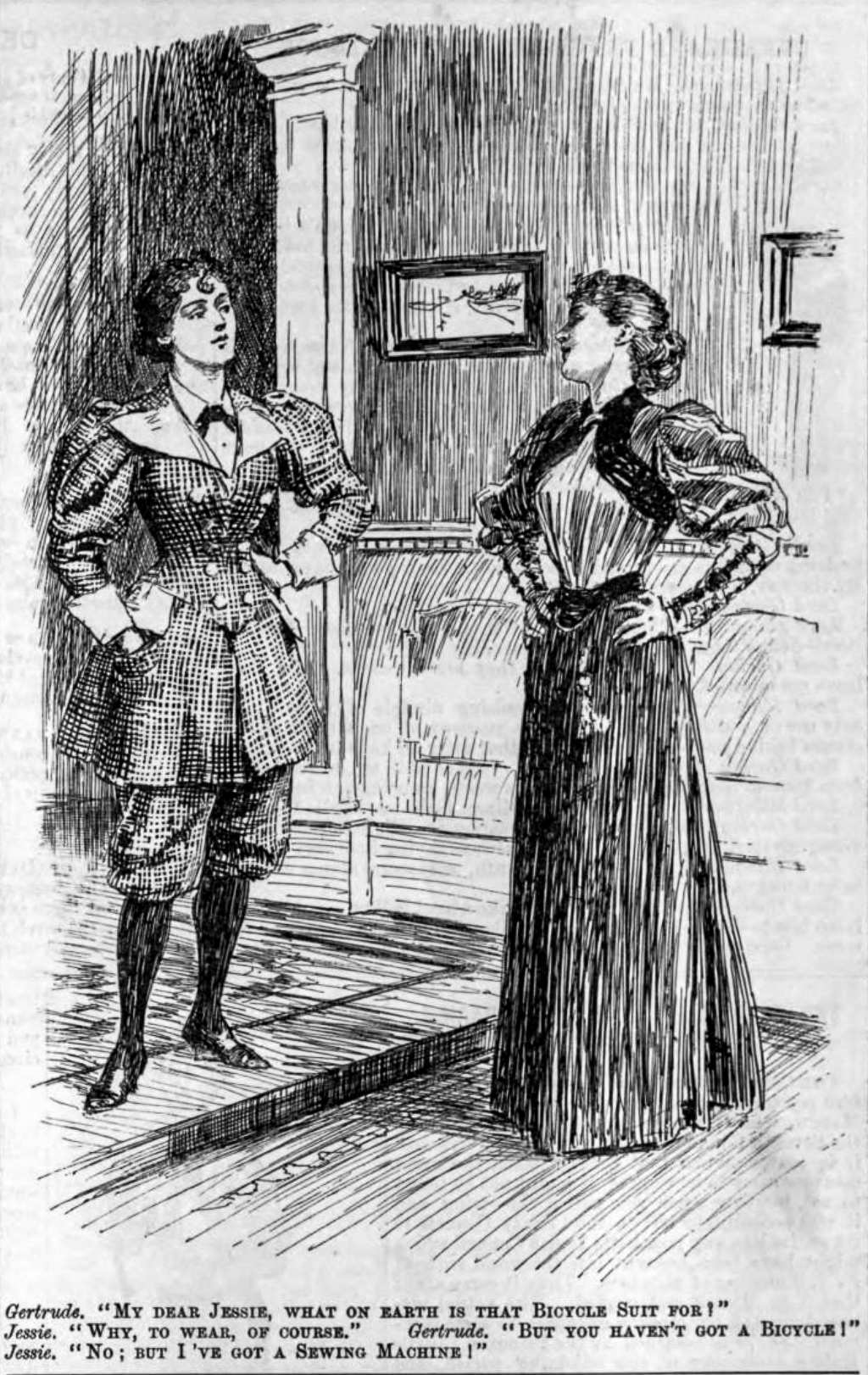
1895 Punch cartoon. Gertrude: "My dear Jessie, what on earth is that Bicycle Suit for?" Jessie: "Why, to wear, of course." Gertrude: "But you haven't got a Bicycle!" Jessie: "No; but I've got a Sewing Machine!"

Victorian dress reform was an objective of the Victorian dress reform movement (also known as the rational dress movement) of the middle and late Victorian era, led by various reformers who proposed, designed, and wore clothing considered more practical and comfortable than the fashions of the time.

Dress reformists were largely middle-class women involved in the first wave of feminism in the Western World, from the 1850s through the 1890s. The movement emerged in the Progressive Era along with calls for temperance, women's education, suffrage and moral purity. Dress reform called for emancipation from the "dictates of fashion", expressed a desire to "cover the limbs as well as the torso adequately," and promoted "rational dress". The movement had its greatest success in the reform of women's undergarments, which could be modified without exposing the wearer to social ridicule. Dress reformers were also influential in persuading women to adopt simplified garments for athletic activities such as bicycling or swimming. The movement was much less concerned with men's clothing, although it initiated the widespread adoption of knitted wool union suits or long johns.

Some of the movement's proponents established dress reform parlors, or storefronts, where women could buy sewing patterns for the garments, or buy them directly.

== Criticisms of tight-lacing ==
Fashion in the 1850s through the 1880s accented large crinolines, cumbersome bustles, and padded busts with tiny waists laced into 'steam-moulded corsetry'. 'Tight-lacing' became part of the corset controversy: dress reformists claimed that the corset was prompted by vanity and foolishness, and harmful to health. The reported health risks included damaged and rearranged internal organs, compromised fertility; weakness and general depletion of health. Those who were pro-corset argued that it was required for stylish dress and had its own unique pleasures; dress historian David Kunzle theorized that some enthusiastic fans of tightlacing may have experienced sexual pleasure when tightlacing, or by rubbing against the front of the corset, which contributed to the moral outrage against the practice. Doctors such as Alice Bunker Stockham counseled patients against them, particularly during maternity; reformist and activist Catharine Beecher was one of the few to defy propriety norms and discuss the gynecological issues resulting from lifelong corset usage, in particular uterine prolapse. Feminist historian Leigh Summers theorized that some moral panic derived from the common but unspeakable idea that tightlacing could be used to induce an abortion.

American women active in the anti-slavery and temperance movements, having experience in public speaking and political agitation, demanded sensible clothing that would not restrict their movement. While supporters of fashionable dress contended that corsets maintained an upright, 'good figure', as a necessary physical structure for moral and well-ordered society, these dress reformists contested that women's fashions were not only physically detrimental, but "the results of male conspiracy to make women subservient by cultivating them in slave psychology." They believed a change in fashions could change the whole position of women, allowing for greater social mobility, independence from men and marriage, the ability to work for wages, as well as physical movement and comfort.

== "Emancipation waists" and undergarment reform ==
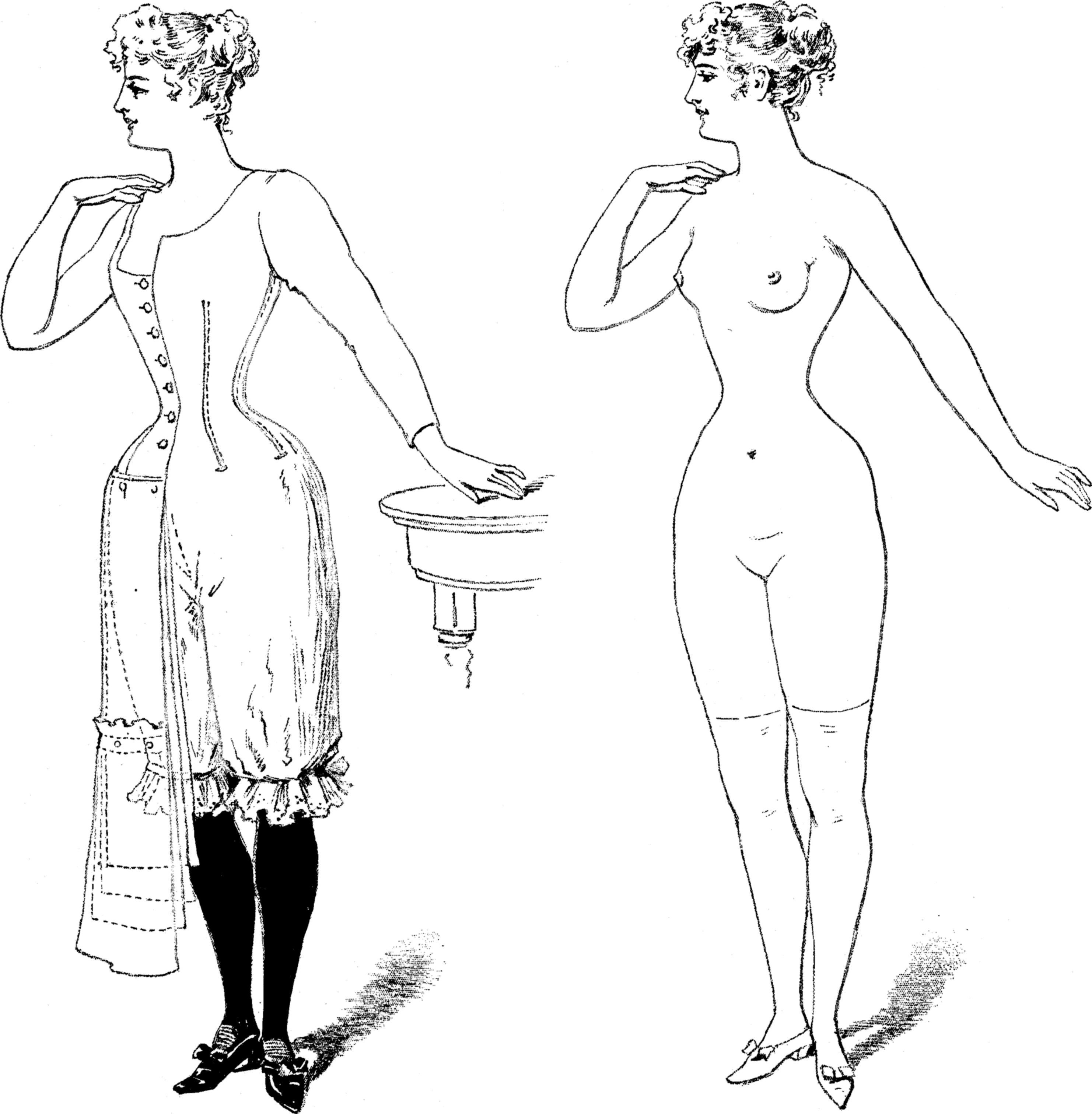
An attempt at dress reform in 1891, but keeping a fashionable silhouette

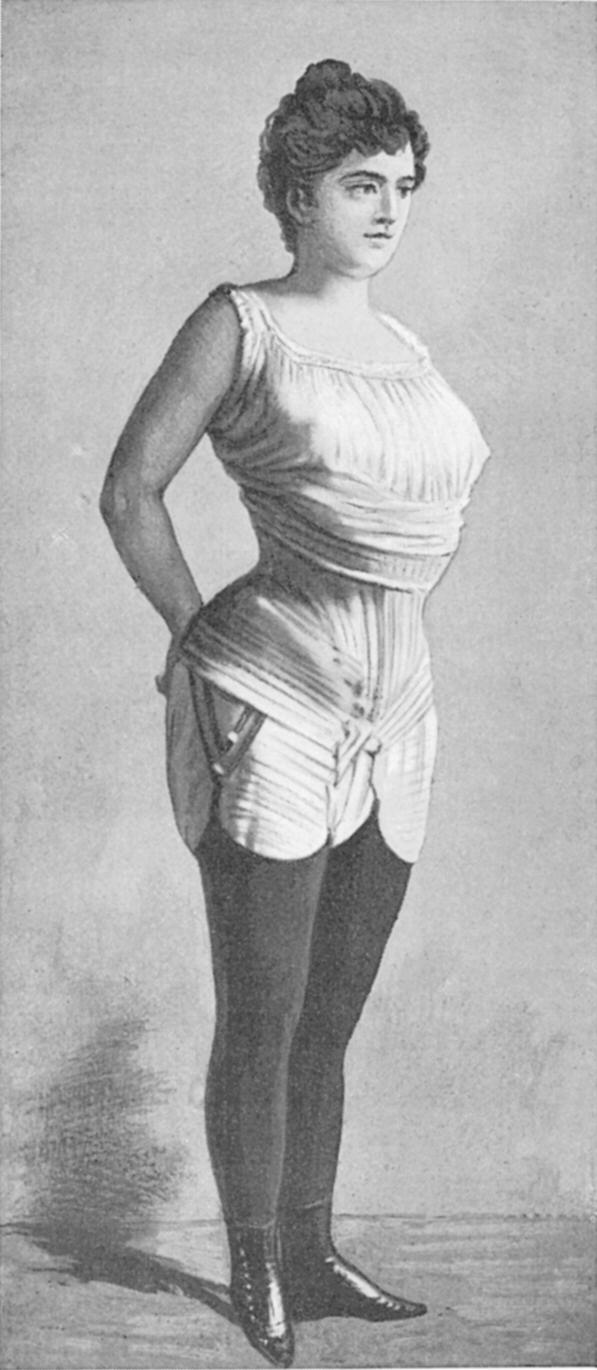
Inès Gaches-Sarraute in a straight-front corset from about 1892, which became fashionable in the Edwardian period

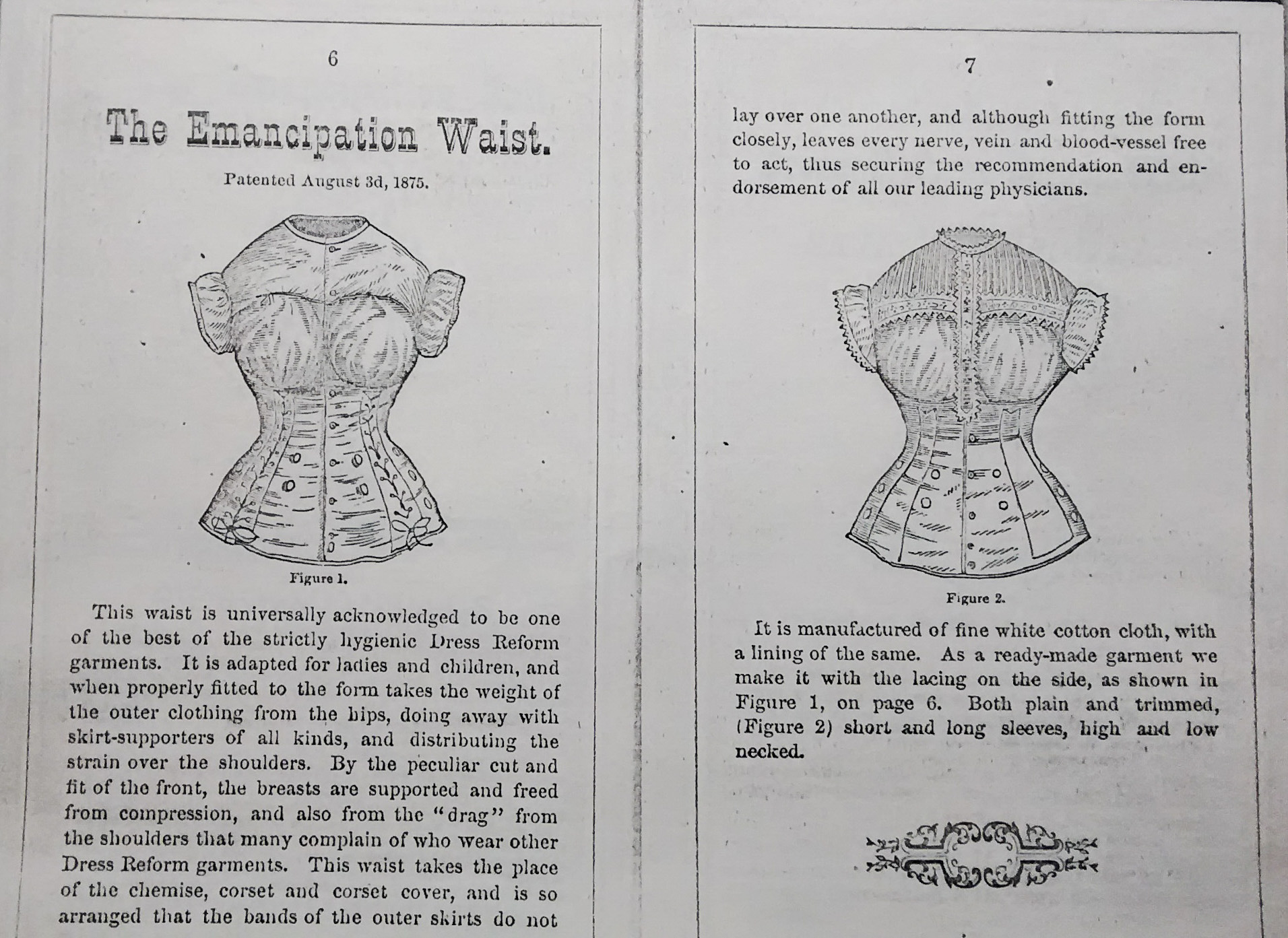
'The Emancipation Waist.' Excerpt from 'Catalog of Dress Reform and Other Sanitary Under-Garments For Ladies and Children' George Frost and Co., Boston Mass June 1, 1876.

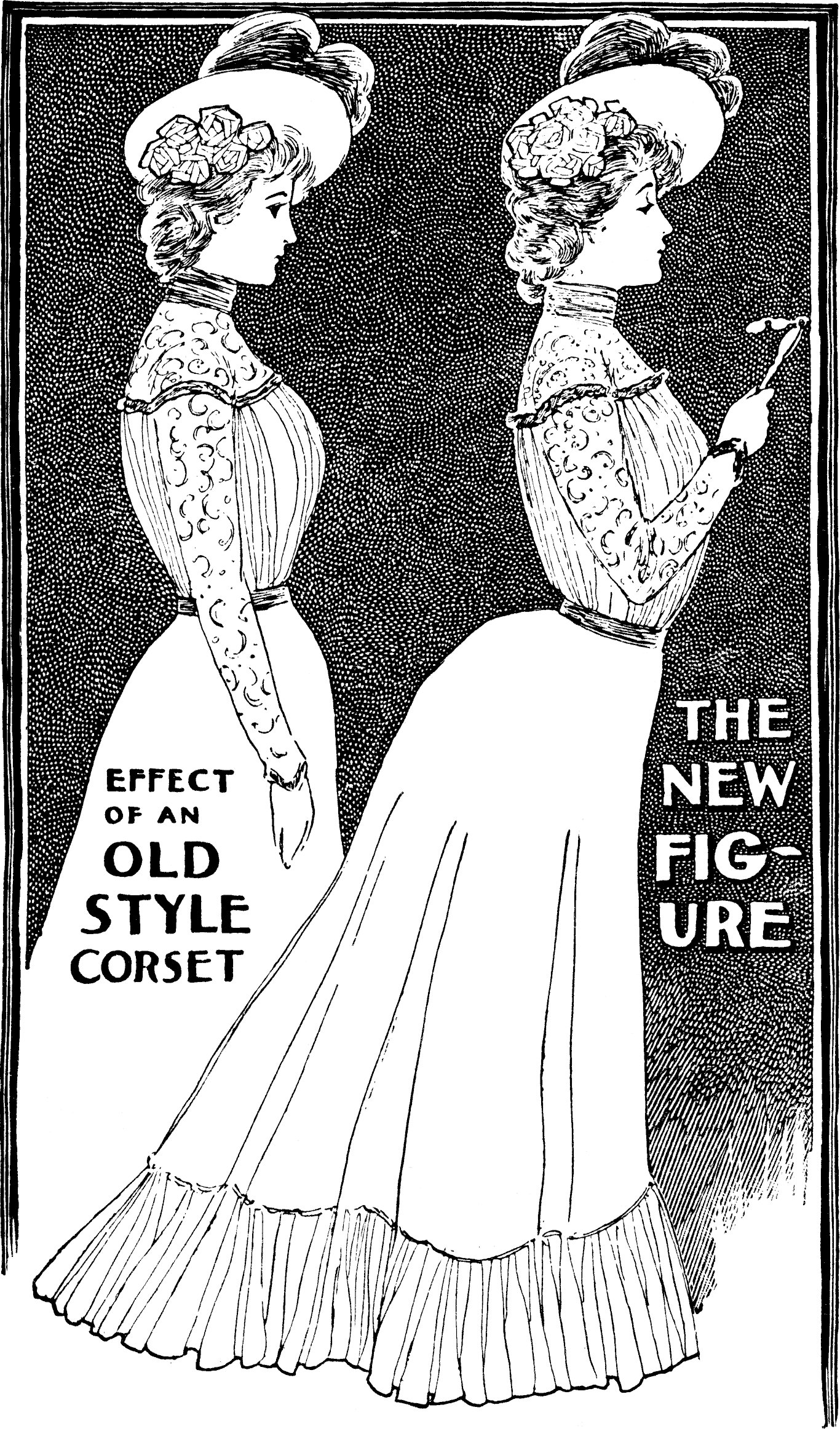
A 1900 diagram from Ladies' Home Journal illustrating the difference between the Victorian and Edwardian corsets

Dress reformers promoted the emancipation waist, or liberty bodice, as a replacement for the corset. The emancipation bodice was a tight sleeveless vest, buttoning up the front, with rows of buttons along the bottom to which could be attached petticoats and a skirt. The entire torso would support the weight of the petticoats and skirt, not just the waist (since the undesirability of hanging the entire weight of full skirts and petticoats from a constricted waist—rather than hanging the garments from the shoulders—was another point often discussed by dress reformers). The bodices had to be fitted by a dressmaker; patterns could be ordered through the mail. Physician Alice Bunker Stockham railed against the corset and said of the pregnancy corset, "The Best pregnancy corset is no corset at all." The "emancipation union under flannel" was first sold in America in 1868. It combined a waist (shirt) and drawers (leggings) in the form we now know as the union suit. While first designed for women, the union suit was also adopted by men, and is still sold and worn today, by both men and women, as winter underclothing.

In 1878, a German professor named Gustav Jaeger published a book claiming that only clothing made of animal hair, such as wool, promoted health. A British accountant named Lewis Tomalin translated the book, then opened a shop selling Dr Jaeger's Sanitary Woollen System, including knitted wool union suits. These were soon called "Jaegers"; they were widely popular.

It is not clear how many women, in either the Americas or on the Continent, wore these so-called "reform" bodices. However, contemporary portrait photography, fashion literature, and surviving examples of the undergarments themselves, all suggest that the corset was almost universal as daily wear by women and young ladies (and numerous fashionable men) until the 1920s, when girdles began to take over.

=== The hygienic corset ===
The primary result of the dress reform movement seems to be the evolution, rather than elimination, of the corset. Because of the public health outcry surrounding corsets and tightlacing, many doctors took it upon themselves to become corsetieres. Many doctors helped to fit their patients with corsets to avoid the dangers of ill-fitting corsets, and some doctors even designed corsets themselves. Roxey Ann Caplin became a widely renowned corset maker, enlisting the help of her husband, a physician, to create corsets which she purported to be more respectful of human anatomy. Inès Gaches-Sarraute designed the straight-front corset in response to her patients' gynecological issues which were attributed to wearing corsets. The design was intended to reduce pressure on the abdomen and improve overall health. The new S-curve silhouette created by this design quickly caught on among fashion houses in the early 20th century.

== Bloomer suit ==
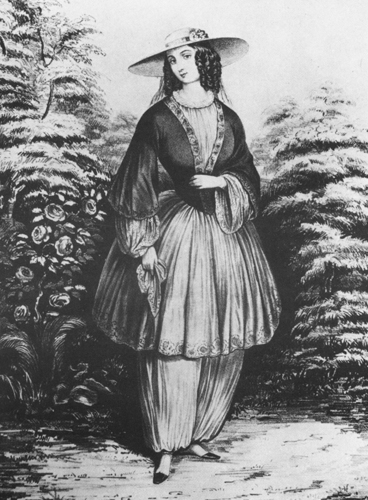
Bloomer Suit

The most famous product of the dress reform era is the bloomer suit. In 1851, a New England temperance activist named Elizabeth Smith Miller (Libby Miller) adopted what she considered a more rational costume: loose trousers gathered at the ankles, like the trousers worn by Middle Eastern and Central Asian women, topped by a short dress or skirt and vest (waistcoat). She displayed her new clothing to temperance activist and suffragist Elizabeth Cady Stanton, who found it sensible and becoming, and adopted it immediately. In this garb, she visited yet another activist, Amelia Bloomer, the editor of the temperance magazine The Lily. Bloomer not only wore the costume, she promoted it enthusiastically in her magazine. More women wore the fashion and were promptly dubbed "Bloomers". A dress reform was supported by a campaign of the National Dress Reform Association, which was founded in 1856.

They put up a fight for a few years, but were subjected to ridicule in the press and harassment on the street. The more conservative of society protested that women had 'lost the mystery and attractiveness as they discarded their flowing robes."

Amelia Bloomer herself dropped the fashion in 1859, saying that a new invention, the crinoline, was a sufficient reform and that she could return to conventional dress. The bloomer costume died—temporarily. It was to return much later (in a different form), as a women's athletic costume in the 1890s and early 1900s.

== Aesthetic Dress movement ==
In the 1870s, a largely English movement led by Mary Eliza Haweis sought dress reform to enhance and celebrate the natural shape of the body, preferring the looser lines of the medieval and renaissance eras. A historic nostalgia for more forgiving fashions, the aesthetic dress movement critiqued fashionable dress for its immovable shapes, and sought the 'fashioning and adorning of a robe' as tastefully complementary to the natural body.

The Pre-Raphaelite Brotherhood and other artistic reformers objected to the elaborately trimmed confections of Victorian fashion with their unnatural silhouette based on a rigid corset and hoops as both ugly and dishonest. Some women associated with the movement adopted a revival style based on romanticised medieval influences such as puffed juliette sleeves and trailing skirts. These styles were made in the soft colors of vegetable dyes, ornamented with hand embroidery in the art needlework style, featured silks, oriental designs, muted colors, natural and frizzed hair, and lacked definitive waist emphasis.

The style spread as an "anti-fashion" called Artistic dress in the 1860s in literary and artistic circles, died back in the 1870s, and reemerged as Aesthetic dress in the 1880s, where two of the main proponents were the writer Oscar Wilde and his wife Constance, both of whom gave lectures on the subject. In 1881 The Rational Dress Society was founded in London. The Society advocated divided skirts as a more practical form of clothing, but its president and co-founder, Lady Florence Harberton, went further - when cycling, she wore full 'Rational' dress, which was a shorter skirt worn over voluminous trousers.

== The rational dress movement by country ==
The dress reform movement spread from the United States and Great Britain to the Nordic countries in the 1880s and from Germany to Austria and the Netherlands. The issue was internationally addressed at the International Congress for Women's Work and Women's Endeavors in Berlin 1896, in which Germany, America, Belgium, Denmark, England, Finland, Russia, Sweden, Switzerland, and Hungary participated.

=== Austria ===
In Austria the dress reform movement was connected to the Arts and Crafts movement, when the Wiener Secession was founded in 1897 by progressive artists in opposition to the Künstlerhaus.

Josef Hoffman, Koloman Moser, Otto Wagner, Alfred Roller and Hermann Bahr supported dress reform, which they expressed in the Dokumente der Frauen in 1902, and some of them contributed with reform dress designs. Gustav Klimt and Emilie Flöge are said to have cooperated in designing reform fashion, and such clothing was associated with the Wiener Werkstätte.

=== Denmark ===
In Denmark, the bloomer costume was adopted for girls' sports wear during ice skating already in the 1860s. While there were no separate dress reform societies founded in Denmark, the women's rights society Dansk Kvindesamfund actively addressed the issue under the influence of the Swedish Dress Reform Society in the 1880s; they published their own brochure, Om Sundheden og Kvindedragten by J. Frisch, collaborated with Stockholm and Oslo with the design of reform costumes and the exposition of them, notably during the Nordic Exhibition of 1888.

=== Finland ===
While there were no separate dress reform societies founded in Finland, the women's rights society Suomen Naisyhdistys actively addressed the issue under the influence of the Swedish Dress Reform Society in the 1880s; they held lectures in many Finnish cities, managed to have the reform costume accepted as sports wear in the girls' schools of the capital by 1887, and was awarded the grand silver medal for their reform costume for school girls in the exhibition of the Russian Hygienic Society in Saint Petersburg in 1893.

=== France ===
There were no separate dress reform societies founded in France. The dress reform issue was met with resistance in France, mainly due to the great importance of the French fashion industry, which was in essence what the dress reform movement was opposing. In France, it was formally banned by law for a woman to wear trousers. Some individual women like George Sand did wear trousers and even dressed like men in public, which was viewed as scandalous.

While the issue of dress reform was adopted and discussed by several of the existing French women's rights organisations, the issue was not given priority, and it was not until the great enthusiasm for bicycling for women in France in the 1890s, that women in general adopted the bloomer costume with trousers and no corsets as sports wear.

By the early 20th century however, the French fashion industry started to adopt several of the traits promoted by the dress reform movement. In the first decade of the 20th century, the reform corset was inducted in the fashionable silhouette. In the fashion introduced by Paul Poiret in the 1910s, French fashion finally shortened the skirts and abolished the corset. Indirectly therefore, the dress reform movement achieved its goal in the same period when French fashion adopted the same reform they had long campaigned for in to fashion.

=== Germany ===
Germany was a leading country of the Reformkleidung, 'dress reform' in the 19th century, as it was an integrated part of the great health reform movement Lebensreform, which spoke for a health reform in clothing for both women and men supported by medical professionals and scientists such as Gustav Jaeger and Heinrich Lahmann, and freedom from the corset and trousers for women was advocated for already.

The women's movement, however, did not engage in the issue until after the International Women's Congress in Berlin in September 1896. Two weeks later the German dress reform association, Allgemeiner Verein zur Verbesserung der Frauenkleidung, was founded. Its first exhibition took place in April 1897 in Berlin. 35 manufacturers had submitted reform proposals. Since 1899 there was even a permanent exhibition in Berlin with examples of "improved women's clothing". Like their equivalents in Austria, the Netherlands and the Nordic countries, the German dress reform association focused on the reform of women's undergarments as the most realistic goal, mainly on corsets. The German movement managed to affect public opinion to such a degree that one of its leading figures, Minna Cauer, was able to report in 1907 that the German corset industry experienced hardships because of a drop in the use of corsets.

=== Japan ===
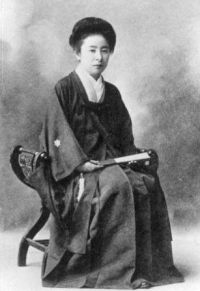
Shimoda Utako in hifu and hakama

Utako Shimoda (1854-1936), a women's activist, educator and dress reformer, found traditional kimono to be too restrictive, preventing women and girls from moving and taking part in physical activities, harming their health. While Western dress was being adopted at the time, she also believed corsets to be restrictive and harmful to women's health. Utako Shimoda had worked as lady-in-waiting to Empress Shōken from 1871 to 1879. She adapted the clothing worn by ladies-in-waiting at the Japanese imperial court to make a uniform for her Jissen Women's University. During the Meiji period (1868–-1912) and Taishō period (1912–-1926), other women's schools also adopted the hakama. It became standard wear for high schools in Japan, though it was later mostly replaced with Western sailor-style uniforms.

Inokuchi Akuri also designed sports clothes for children.

At the imperial court, simplified keiko replaced more cumbersome garments.

=== The Netherlands ===
In the Netherlands, interest for the issue was aroused after the foundation of a dress reform society in neighboring Germany, and in 1899 the Dutch dress reform society Vereeniging voor Verbetering van Vrouwenkleeding (V.v.V.v.V.).

The dress reform society held lectures, participated in exhibitions and worked with designers to produce a new fashion for women which could be not only attractive but also comfortable and healthy at the same time.

=== Norway ===
While there were no separate dress reform societies founded in Norway, the women's rights society Norsk Kvinnesaksforening actively addressed the issue under the influence of the Swedish Dress Reform Society from the 1880s; they collaborated with Stockholm and Copenhagen with the design of reform costumes and the exposition of them, notably during the Nordic Exhibition of 1888.

Norway is in fact described as one of the countries where the interest and success for the issue was greatest. The physician Lorentz Dietrichson, a prominent participant for the abolition of the corset in the corset controversy in both Sweden and Norway, held a lecture in Norway in favor of dress reform already in 1886, as a commentary of the Swedish dress reform movement in which he himself also participated; the Swedish dress reform society successfully exhibited their reform dress in Oslo, the Norsk Kvinnesaksforening became interested, and the movement thereby started in Norway the same year as in Sweden. Johanne Biörn held lectures in the Oslo schools, and the Norwegian designer Kristine Dahl experienced success not only in her home country of Norway but also in Sweden, becoming a central figure of the dress reform movement.

=== Sweden ===
Sweden was a leading nation of the dress reform movement, as the movement came first to Sweden of all the Nordic countries and spread from there to Denmark, Finland and Norway.

In 1885, professor Curt Wallis brought with him the English language dress reform book Dress and Health from abroad, which was translated to Swedish by Oscara von Sydow as Reformdrägten: En bok för qvinnor skrifven af qvinnor. After a speech by Anne Charlotte Leffler held at the women's club Nya Idun, the Friends of Handicraft gave Hanna Winge the assignment to design a reform costume, which was produced by Augusta Lundin and exhibited in public, which gave further publicity to the issue, and in 1886, the Swedish Dress Reform Society was founded.

After an initial attempt to launch a reform costume, the Swedish dress reform movement focused on a reform of women's underwear, particularly the corset. The Swedish reform dress movement corresponded with their equivalent in Great Britain as well as the American dress reform movement of Annie Jenness Miller.

The dress reform movement did achieve some success in Sweden; by the 1890s, corsets were no longer accepted for the pupils of the Swedish girls' schools, and the leading Swedish fashion designer Augusta Lundin reported that her clients no longer subjected themselves to tight lacing.

== Eventual shifts in fashion ==
Although the Victorian dress reform movement itself failed to enact widespread change in women's fashion, social, political, and cultural shifts into the 1920s brought forth an organic relaxation of dress standards.

With new opportunities for women's college, the national suffrage amendment of 1920 and women's increased public career options during and after World War I, fashion and undergarment structures relaxed, along with the improved social standing of women. Embodying the New Woman idea, women donned masculine-inspired fashions including simple tailored skirt suits, ties, and starched blouses. By the 1920s, male-style garments for casual and sporting activities were less socially condemned. New fashions required lighter undergarments, shorter skirts, looser bodices, trousers, and praised slender 'boyish' figures. As Lady Duff Gordon remarked, in the 1920s "women took off their corsets, reduced their clothing to the minimum tolerated by conventions and wore clothes which wrapped round them rather than fitted."

Although forms of corsets, girdles and bras were worn well into the 1960s, as Riegel states, "Feminine emancipation had brought greater dress reform than the most visionary of the early feminists had advocated."

== Gallery ==
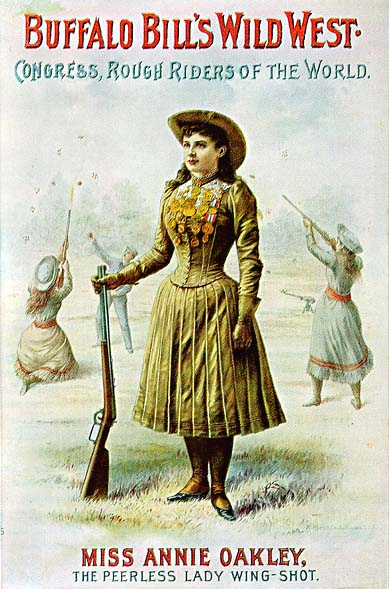
Approx. second half of 1880s poster showing Annie Oakley wearing short-skirted attire

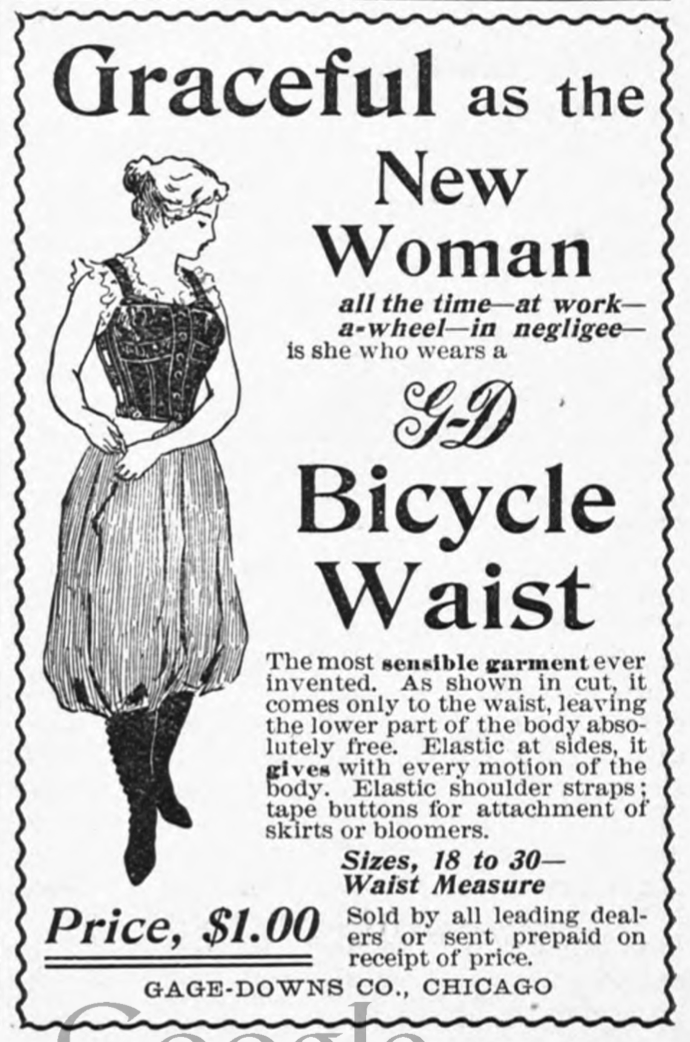
1896 ad showing a modified girdle, allowing women freedom of the lower extremities, making it easier to ride a bicycle, then in vogue

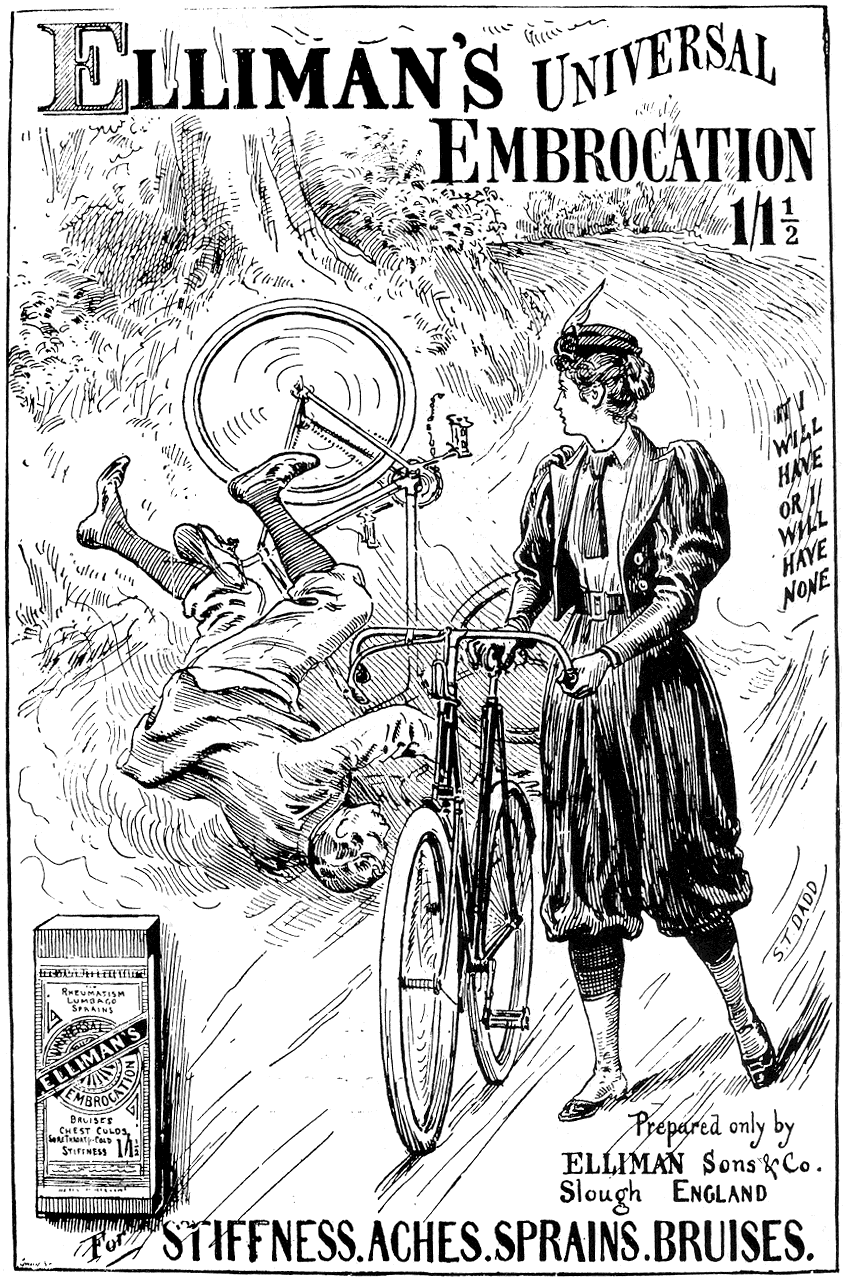
An 1897 ad, showing a relatively early example of an ordinary non-sea-bathing woman in public view in unskirted garments (to ride a bicycle)

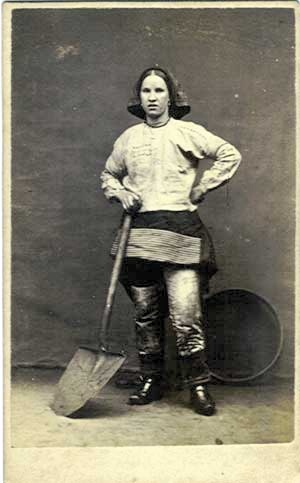
Wigan "pit brow lasses" scandalized by wearing trousers for dangerous work in coal mines. They wore skirts over their trousers, rolled up to the waist to keep them out of the way.

== See also ==
- Bicycling and feminism
- Corset controversy
- Lebensreform
- Liberty bodice
- Trousers as women's clothing
- Victorian fashion
- Women's suffrage and Western women's fashion through the early 20th century
- Sade Giyinen Hanımlar Cemiyeti
- Kanoun-e-Banovan
