= Liberty bodice =

Undergarment for women and girls

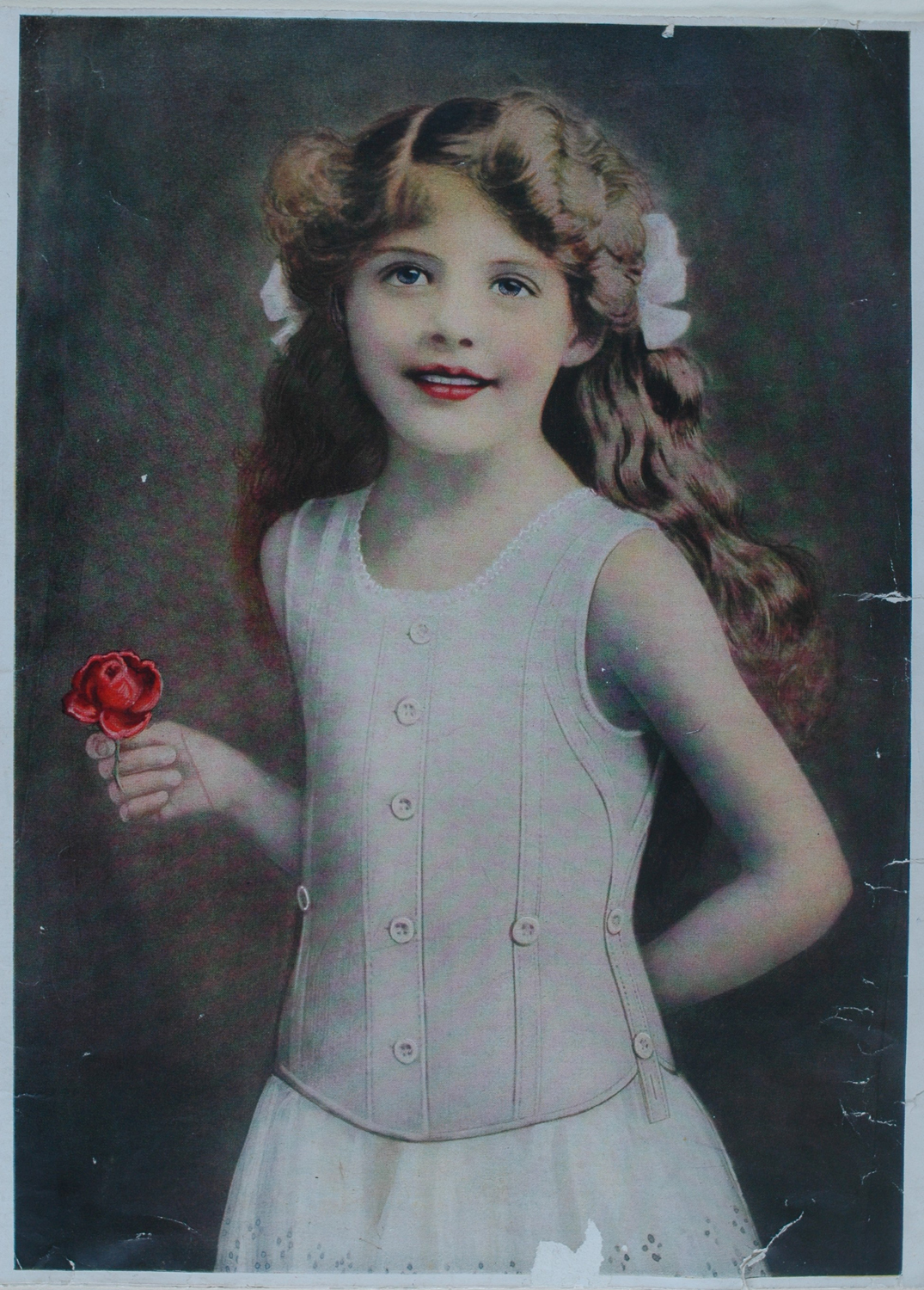
Freda Cox wearing a liberty bodice in an early advertising photograph for Symington, published between 1908 and 1910.

The liberty bodice (Australian and British English), like the emancipation bodice or North American emancipation waist, was an undergarment for women and girls invented towards the end of the 19th century, as an alternative to a corset.

In the United Kingdom they were well known for decades, with some older women still using them in the 1970s. A liberty bodice was a simply shaped sleeveless bodice, often made of warm, fleecy fabric, usually with suspenders (US garters) attached. It might be straight or slightly curvy, and sometimes had buttons to fasten on other underwear: drawers (knickers or US panties) or petticoat/slip. A vest (US undershirt) might be worn underneath. The bodices had no boning, unlike corsets, although some had firm cloth strapping which might encourage good posture.

While some writers discuss liberty bodices as a restrictive garment imposed on children, these bodices were originally intended to "liberate" women from the virtually universally worn, highly structured corsets that were the norm of contemporary fashion. These new undergarments derived from the Victorian dress reform Movement, which aimed to free women from what they saw as body-compressing corsetry and excessive layers of underclothing. The concept was related to the Women's Emancipation Movement, but in practice some of the early liberty bodices in the UK were advertised for maids who would be freer to get on with their work without a constricting corset. Later the liberty bodice came to be thought of as something practical for a child who could be buttoned up warmly.

Liberty bodices are commonly associated with R. & W. H. Symington of Market Harborough, Leicestershire, but the name had already been used before they made their first bodice: a version for girls aged 9–13 was sold for one shilling and ninepence-halfpenny in 1908. The name has also been used for products from other manufacturers or for home-made garments.
