= Artistic Dress =

Medieval-inspired dress reform movement

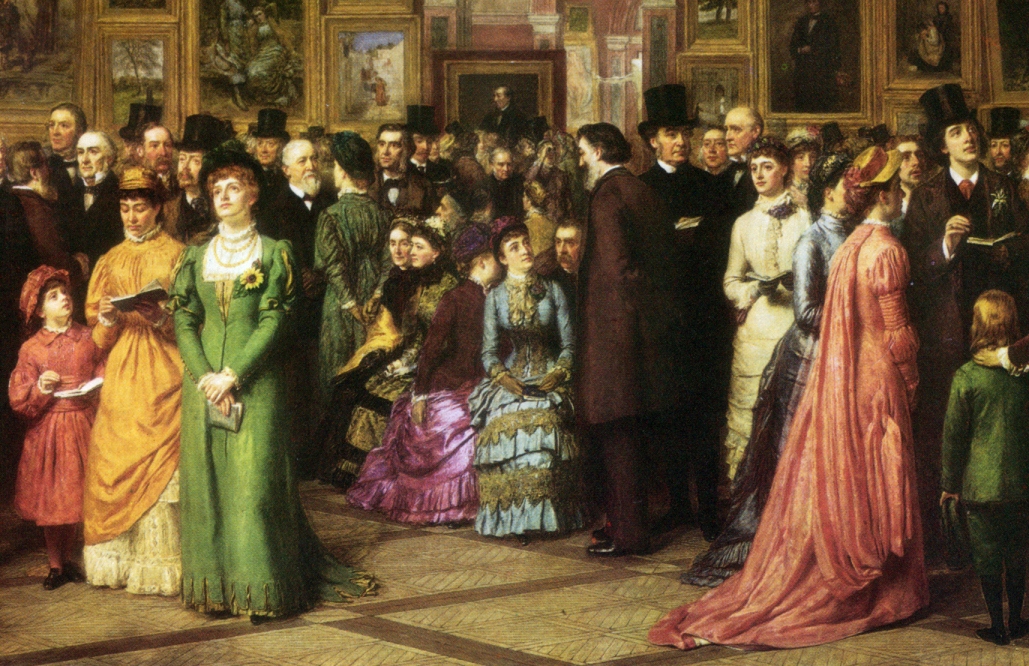
Detail of A Private View at the Royal Academy, 1881. William Powell Frith's satirical painting of 1883 contrasts women's Aesthetic dress (left and right) with fashionable attire (centre) at a private view.

Artistic Dress was a fashion movement in the second half of the nineteenth century that rejected highly structured and heavily trimmed Victorian trends in favour of beautiful materials and simplicity of design. It arguably developed in Britain in the early 1850s, influenced by artistic circles such as the Pre-Raphaelites, and Dress Reform movements. It subsequently developed into more specific categories such as Aesthetic Dress and Künstlerkleid on the Continent.

== Artistic dress ==
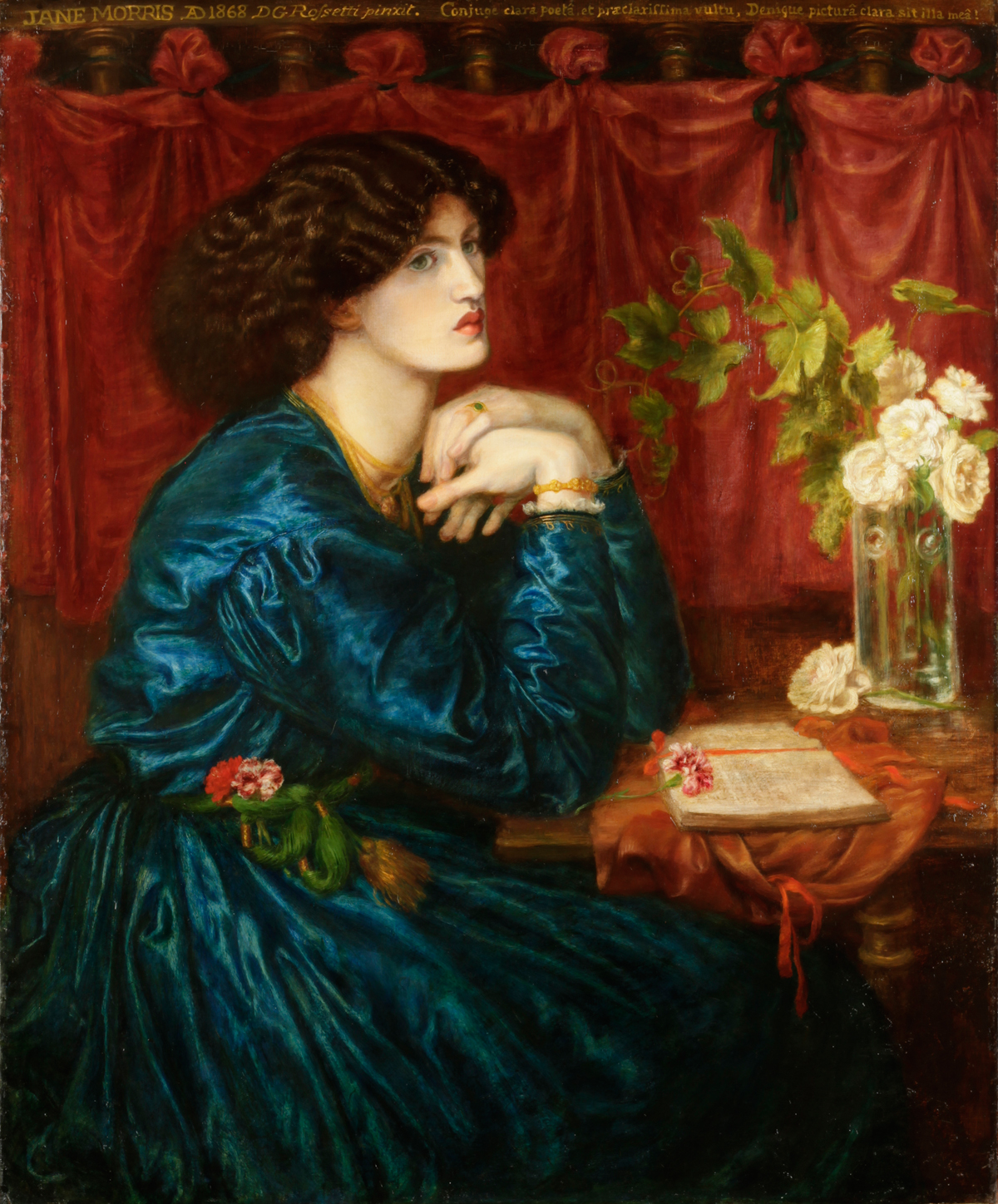
Jane Morris (The Blue Silk Dress) by Dante Gabriel Rossetti, 1868

Dante Gabriel Rossetti and other members of the Pre-Raphaelite Brotherhood were conscious archaisers, emulating Quattrocento Italian artists and choosing romantic, medieval subjects. They dressed their models in long flowing gowns loosely inspired by styles of the Middle Ages. These styles were then adopted by the painters' wives and models for everyday dress. Dresses were loosely fitted and comparatively plain, often with long puffed sleeves; they were made from fabric in muted colours derived from natural dyes, and could be ornamented with embroidery in the art needlework style. Artistic dress was an extreme contrast to the tight corsets, hoop skirts and bustles, bright synthetic aniline dyes, and lavish ornamentation seen in the mainstream fashion of the period.

In the 1860s, artistic dress became popular in intellectual circles and among artists for its natural beauty; it also reinforced their social ideals of quality materials, respect for the work of the hands, and the purity of medieval design.

== Aesthetic dress ==
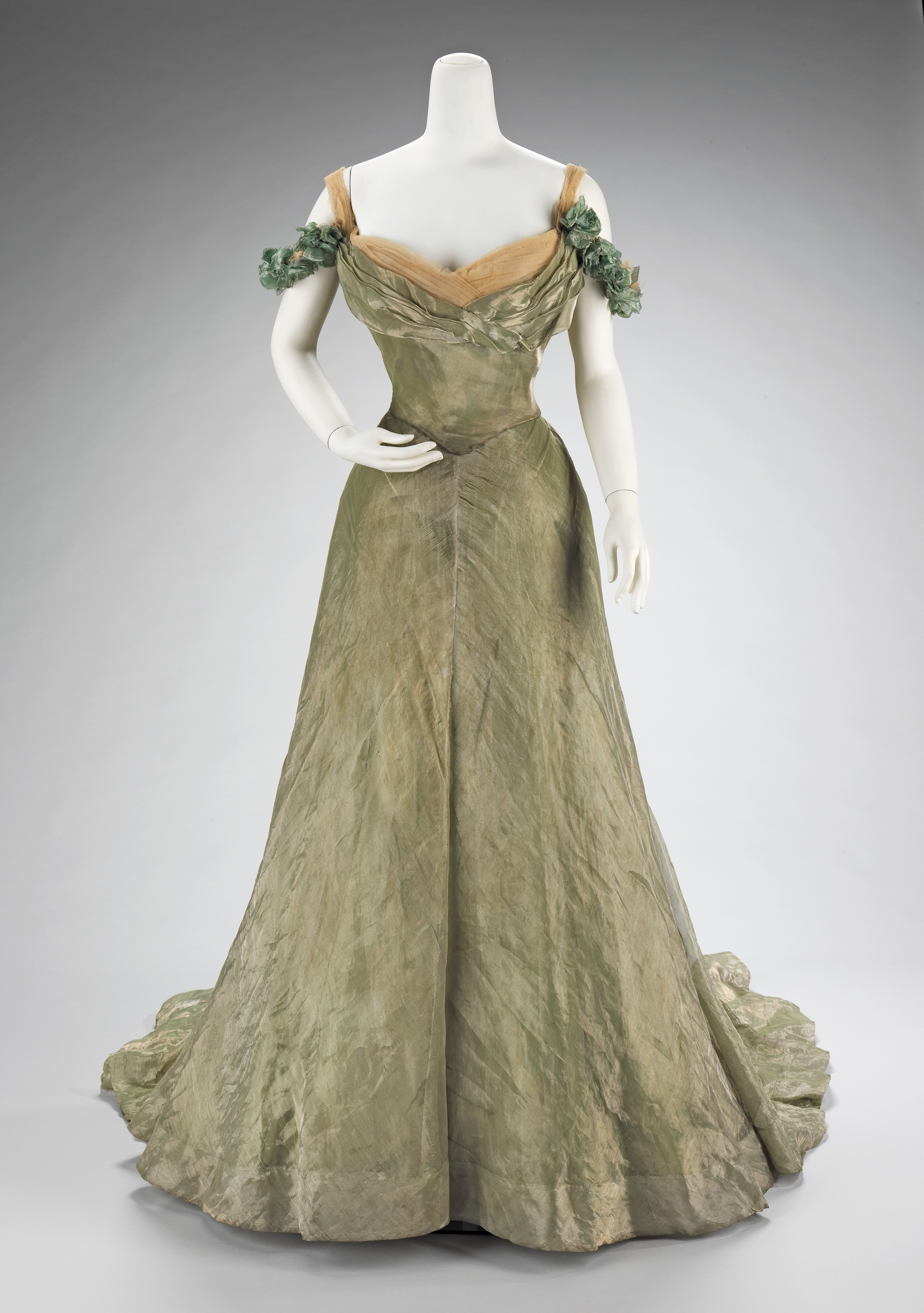
Ball gown designed by Jacques Doucet, 1898–1900, with characteristics of the Aesthetic dress movement: simple in design, "yet extravagant by the choice of materials used. The sheer overlayer is enhanced by the solid lamé underlayers and a sense of luxury is added by the hidden lace flounce at the hem."

Oscar Wilde in his Aesthetic lecturing costume, 1882. Photo by Napoleon Sarony. Wilde wrote about Aesthetic dress movement in his treatise The Philosophy of Dress.

Aesthetic dress of the 1880s and 1890s carries on many of the external characteristics of Artistic dress (rejection of tightlacing in favour of simplicity of line and emphasis on beautiful fabrics), even though, at its core, Aestheticism rejected the moral and social goals of the Victorian dress reform that was its precursor. The Aesthetes' belief that the Arts should provide refined sensuous pleasure was in conflict with the reverence for simplicity and handwork propounded by William Morris, even though he likewise believed so.

Aesthetic dress encompassed a range of modes, from the Japonaise gowns and Kate Greenaway-inspired children's smocks of Liberty & Co. to the velvet jackets and knee breeches of Oscar Wilde's "Aesthetic lecturing costume" for his speaking tour of America in 1882. Prominent designers and dressmakers associated with the movement include Ada Nettleship, who designed costumes for Oscar Wilde's wife Constance Lloyd, and Alice Comyns Carr, who was head costume designer for the actress Ellen Terry. Anna Muthesius was a German designer living in London who was annoyed that women were being exploited by clothing industrialists and that to avoid their pronouncements they should decide on their own fabrics and designs. Her 1903 book, Das Eigenkleid der Frau, which incorporated an Art Nouveau binding by Frances MacDonald, is considered an important contribution to the Artistic Dress movement.

== Influence on mainstream fashion ==
From artistic circles, artistic and Aesthetic dress spread to fashionable ones. The delicate, lightly corseted tea gowns of the turn of the 20th century echo the lines of late Aesthetic dress, and in their turn paved the way for the early Art Deco creations of Paul Poiret.

== Gallery ==
Early artistic dress: Symphony in White No. 1 by Whistler, 1862

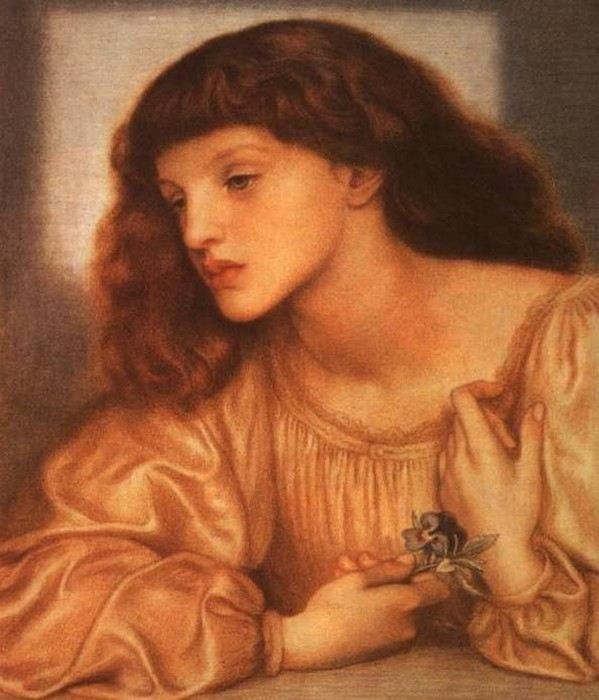
The young May Morris by Dante Gabriel Rossetti, 1872

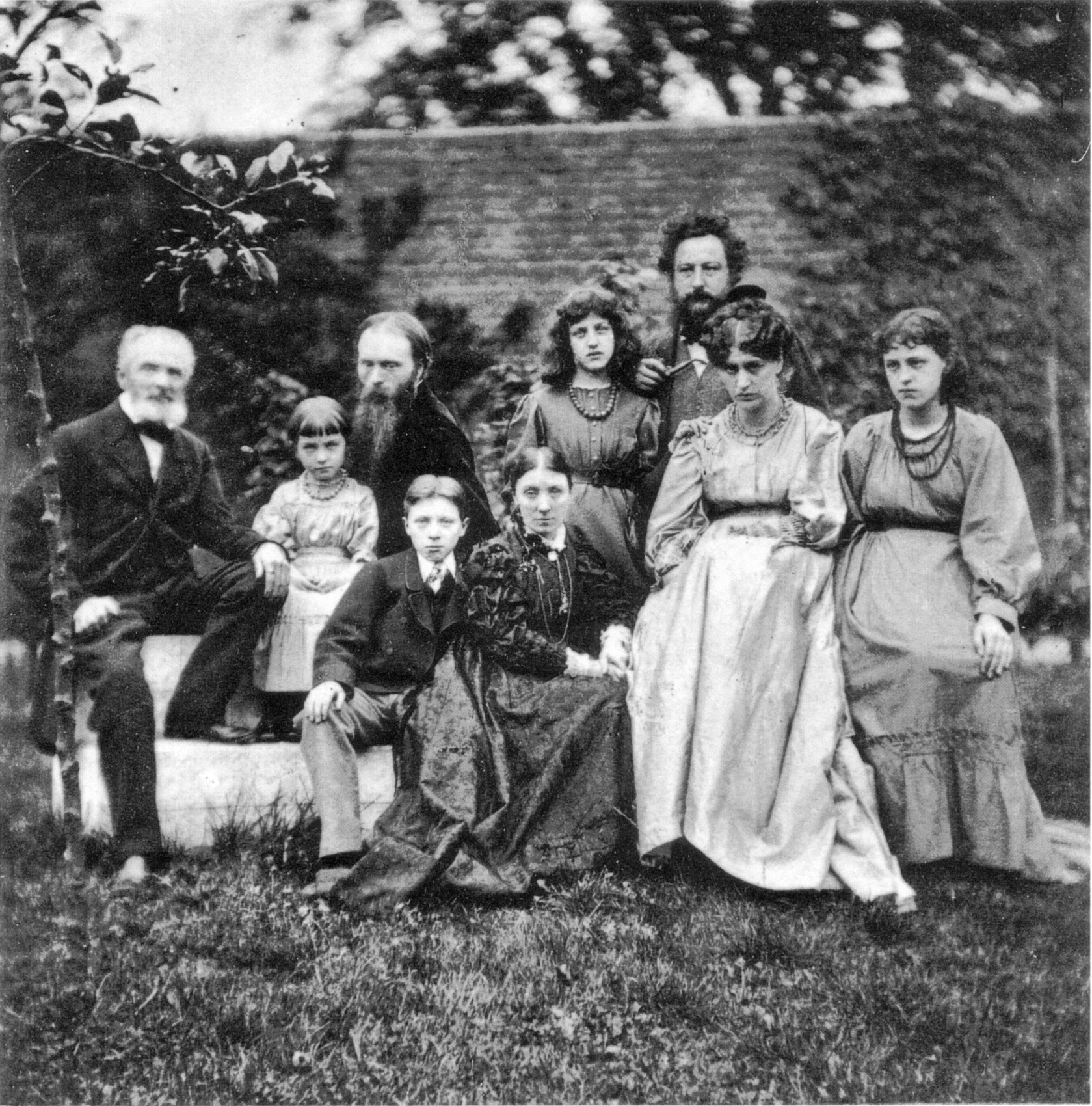
The wives and daughters of William Morris and Edward Burne-Jones in artistic dress, 1874

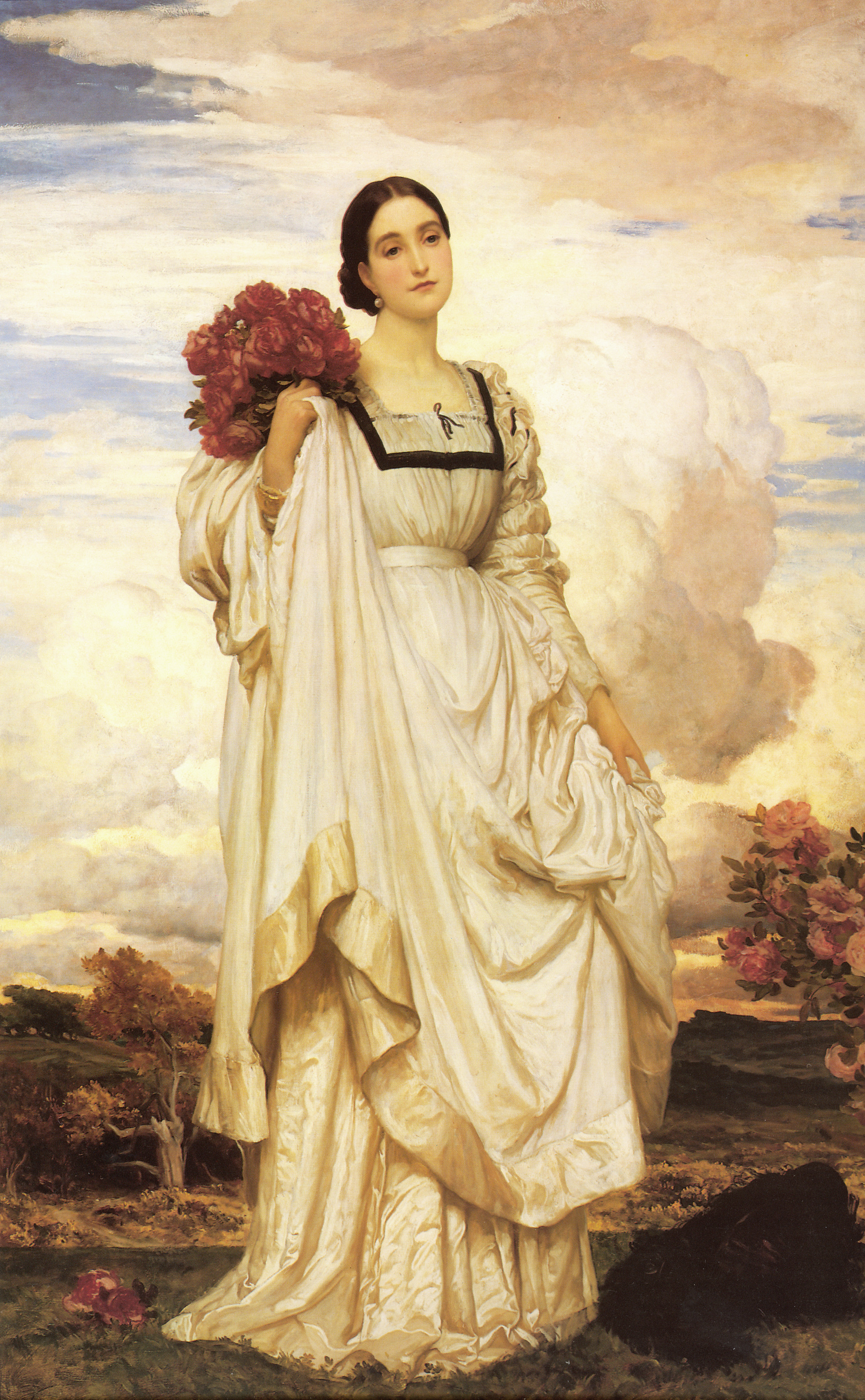
Leighton Brownlow in artistic dress, 1879.

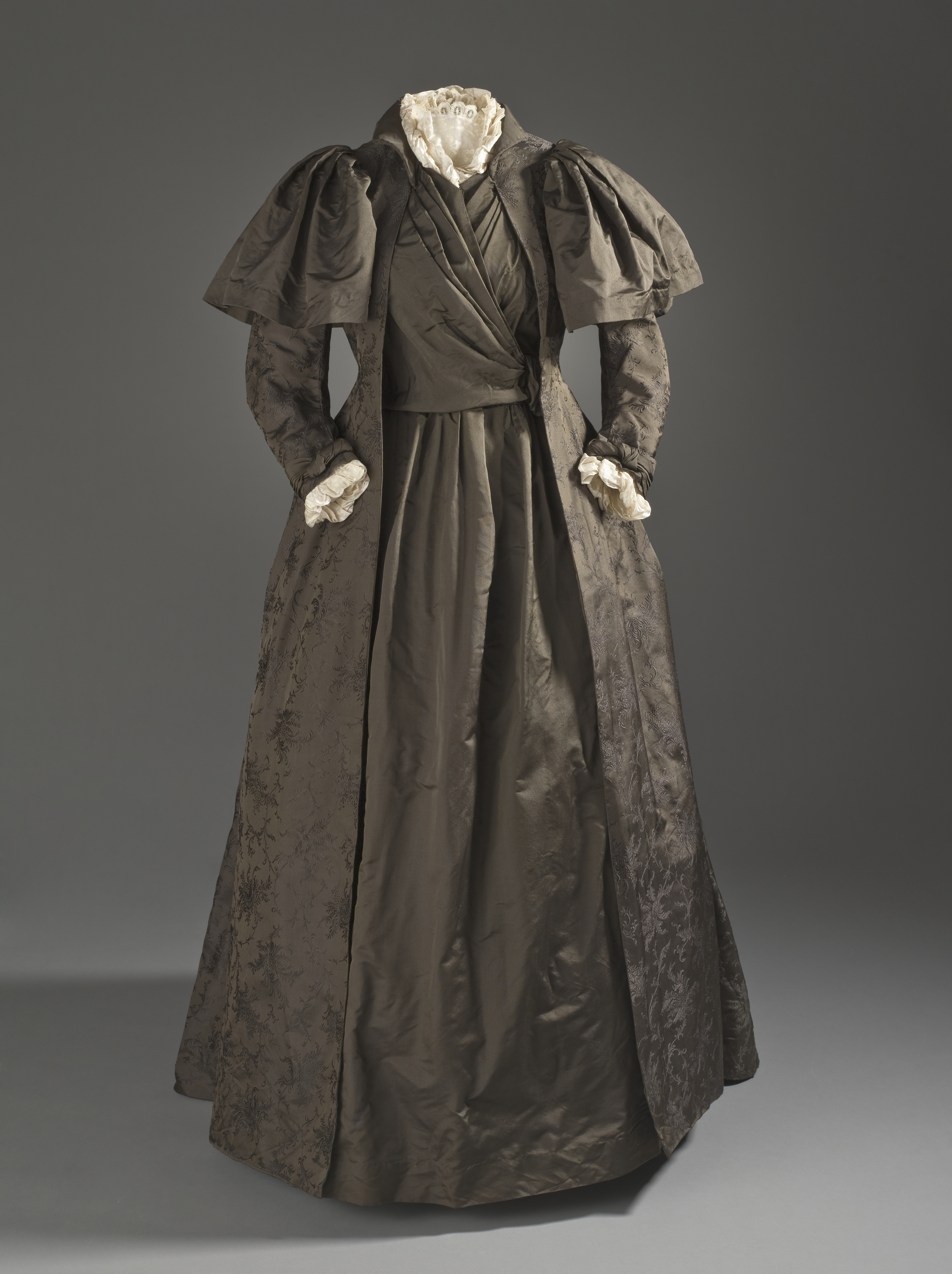
Liberty & Co tea gown of figured silk twill, c. 1887. Los Angeles County Museum of Art, M.2007.211.901

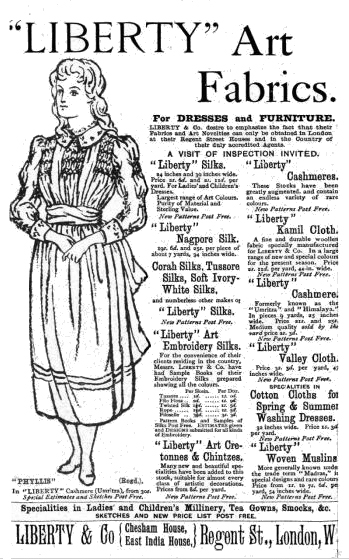
Liberty art fabrics advertisement showing a young girl's dress with smocking, May 1888

== See also ==
- The Souls
- Victorian fashion
- Victorian dress reform
- Svenska drägtreformföreningen
- National Dress Reform Association
- 1860s in fashion
- 1870s in fashion
- 1880s in fashion
- The Philosophy of Dress, an essay by Oscar Wilde.
