= Deutscher Verband Frau und Kultur =

The Deutscher Verband Frau und Kultur (English: German Association for Women and Culture) is a German organization, founded in Berlin in Germany in 1896. The organization work to benefit creativity, cultural education and social engagement for women.

The organization has also been known under the name Allgemeiner Verein zur Verbesserung der Frauenkleidung (English: General Association for the Improvement of Women's Clothing) also known as Der Allgemeine Verein für Verbesserung der Frauenkleidung between 1896 and 1912; as Deutscher Verband für Neue Frauenkleidung und Frauenkultur in 1912–1914; as Verband für deutsche Frauenkleidung und Frauenkultur 1914–1929, as Verband deutsche Frauenkultur 1929–1973, and finally as Deutscher Verband Frau und Kultur in 1973.

== History ==
=== Dress reform association ===
The organization was founded under the name Allgemeiner Verein zur Verbesserung der Frauenkleidung. The association was founded following the International Women's Congress in Berlin in September 1896. The purpose was to campaign for the improvement of women's clothing and make them more healthy, comfortable and esthetic, and it was a part of the international dress reform movement.

Its first exhibition took place in April 1897 in Berlin. 35 manufacturers had submitted reform proposals. Since 1899 there was even a permanent exhibition in Berlin with examples of "improved women's clothing". Like their equivalents in Austria, the Netherlands and the Nordic countries, the German dress reform association focused on the reform of women's undergarments as the most realistic goal, mainly on corsets. The German movement managed to affect public opinion to such a degree that one of its leading figures, Minna Cauer, was able to report in 1907 that the German corset industry experienced hardships because of a drop in the use of corsets.

=== Cultural association ===
After World War I, the goal of the dress reform movement was reached by the changes in fashion, and the association transformed to a cultural association for women. After the rise to power of Nazi Germany in 1933, the organization, similarly to most other German women's organizations, was first forcibly incorporated in the Deutsches Frauenwerk and then dissolved.

The organization was revived after World War II in 1948.
