= Women's suffrage and Western women's fashion through the early 20th century =

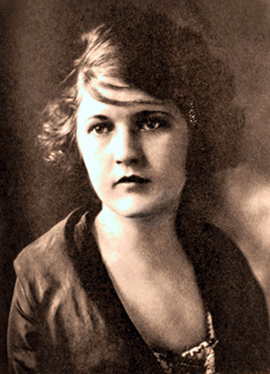
Portrait of Zelda Fitzgerald.

The Women's suffrage movement in the Western world was an important driving force for cultural, social, and political change in the late 19th and early 20th centuries. The movement originated in the United States in the 1850s and aimed at economic and political reforms, including the expansion of suffrage. In addition to its impact on women's rights, suffrage brought about a marked change in women's fashion, reshaping traditional styles in favor of practical and symbolic clothing that reflected their changing social roles.

Women began to embrace clothing styles that challenged Victorian designs. These styles included the abandonment of corsets, short skirts, and high hemlines, symbolizing a challenge to earlier defined traditions, and an inspired desire for independence and equality. Feminist opposition to traditional clothing was partly motivated by health concerns; traditional women's clothing was too dangerous and bulky.This led to the rise of the rational dress movement. Clothing such as trousers and tracksuits became increasingly popular, offering women greater flexibility and functionality in activities such as cycling and protesting.

The connection between suffrage and fashion extended to the broader push for democracy and gender equality. As women became more involved in work and advocacy, their clothing styles evolved to accommodate their active roles. By the early 20th century, women’s clothing had evolved on its own: short skirts, sports trousers, and bicycle skirts were all popular. Feminists stopped emphasizing clothing reform after this point, as suffrage, education and job opportunities had improved dramatically. These changes highlight the interplay between social change and individual expression and mark a period in which fashion reflected advances in women's rights.

== Women's dress pre-women's suffrage ==
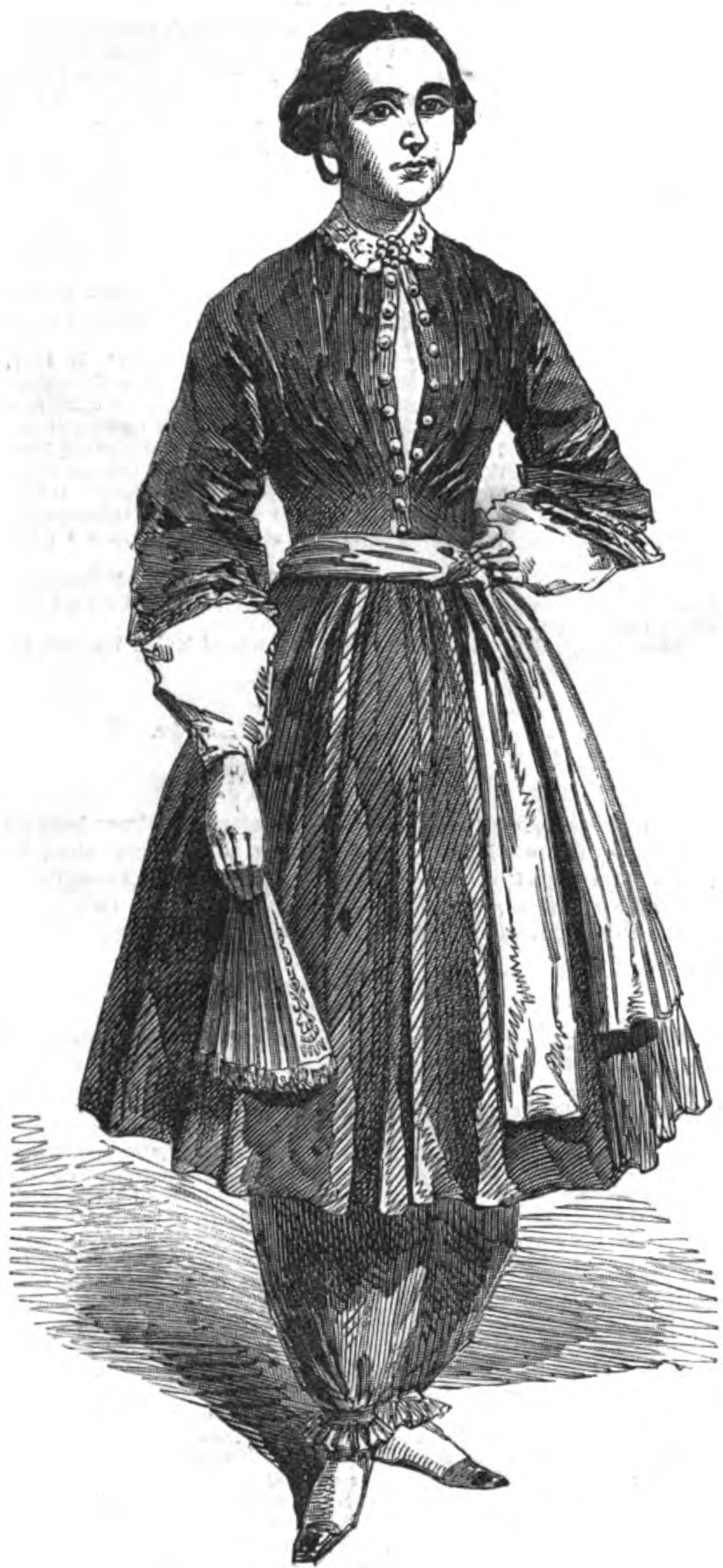
Advocate Amelia Bloomer, wearing the "freedom suit."

Prior to Women's Suffrage Movement, women's fashion was dominated by Victorian styles, which included grand gowns. They were characterized by being considered unsuitable for physical labour. These garments reinforced traditional gender roles, and women were generally seen as physically weaker than men and discouraged from participating in labour or sport. In the 1850s, dress reform advocates such as Amelia Bloomer introduced alternatives such as the ‘rational dress.’ to make a statement about women's suffrage. However, the response to these garments was mixed, with limited adoption due to social resistance and criticism from those around them. Despite initial challenges, early efforts at clothing reform laid the groundwork for the development of women's fashions later during the suffrage movement and resurfaced in the early 1870s, with more radical reforms replacing milder proposals, such as the Civil War medic Dr Mary E. Walker's argument that women and men were anatomically similar and should therefore wear similar clothing by prioritizing functionality and comfort, and these changes highlighted the growing shift toward equality and empowerment for women.

Nonetheless, at the turn of the century, it remained the case that “from society lady to factory "girl," every woman wore a hat, stockings, shoes, and gloves in all seasons.”

== Women's fashion during the women's suffrage movement ==
In light of the First World War, women commenced employment in factories to aid the war effort, beginning in jobs that the men were no longer able to undertake, as they were serving in the front lines of the war. As a result, the dress reform began, a reform that saw female activists argue clothes should offer convenience, rather than comfort, so that they could do labour jobs more efficiently. Accordingly, fashion became less restrictive than the Victorian era dress and required less fabric to make, saving the much needed resources. An article written by Laura Doan states, the newly found freedom of women is considered to have been a catalyst for the commencement of women including more masculinised fashion and style in their own dress.

In accordance with the emerging modern woman, the New Woman's moxie was paradoxically evident in her lack of charm, exhibiting short bobbed haircuts, heavier makeup, and boyish frames. The flapper's simplistic, straight-lined style was popularized by Coco Chanel, who's somewhat ironically remembered as "fashionable without being forward," as a way of liberating women the impractical designs that hindered modern women's ability to engage in physical activities. "The newfound freedom to breathe and walk encouraged movement out of the house, and the Flapper took full advantage.”

Many men did not fully accept the changing styles in women's fashion. At the same time, typical female fashion retained, to a great extent, a traditional feminine style, corresponding to the relatively rigid beauty standards of the time.

== Women's fashion post-women's suffrage movement (1920s–1930s) ==
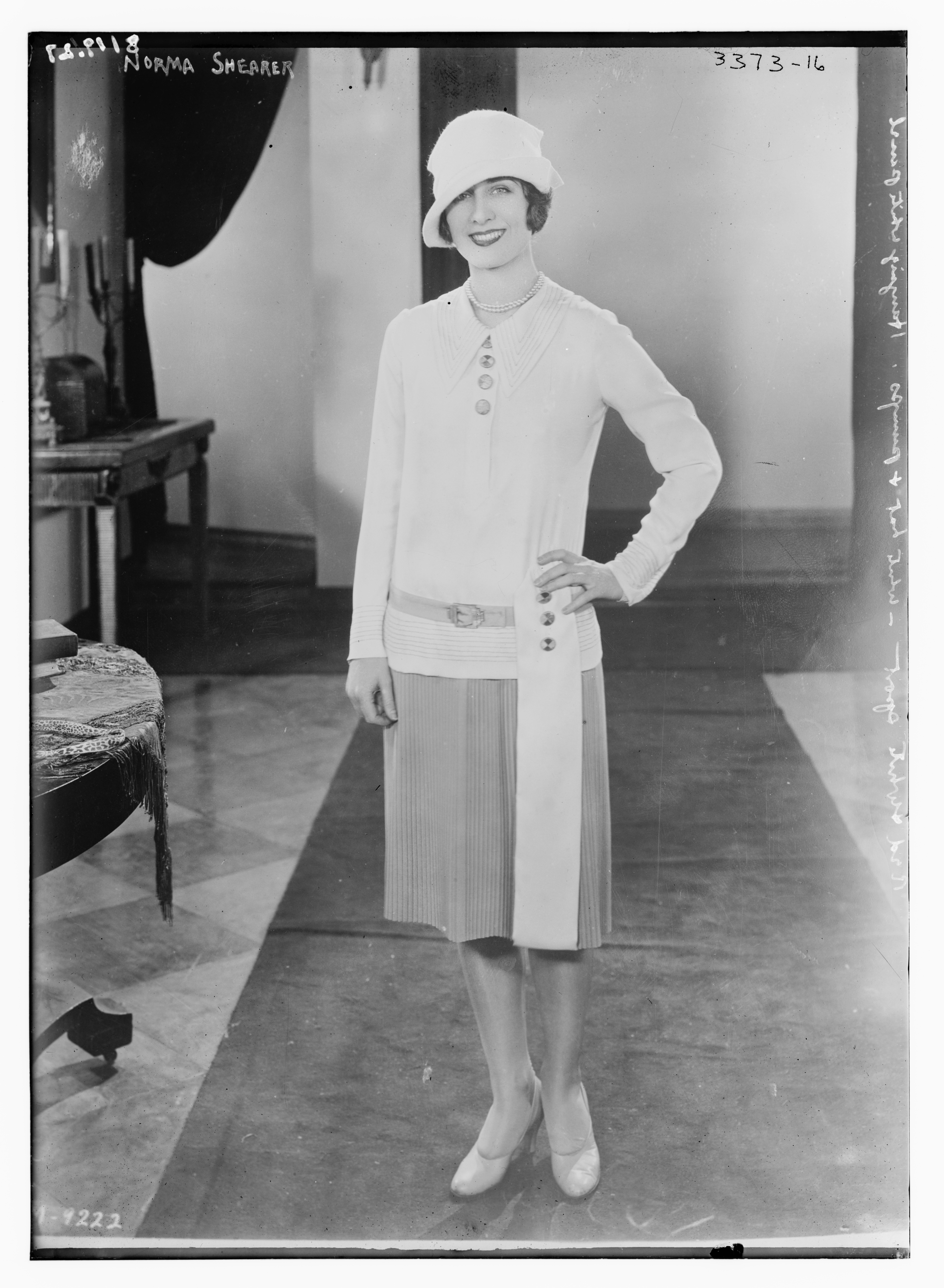
Actress Norma Shearer photographed in 1927.

During the progressive era, female fashion in the United States changed shifted to adopt traditionally masculine styles. Pants became widespread, with female baseball players wearing knickers underneath their prescribed uniform. Other fashion trends included pearl jewellery and petite handbags, popularised by French designer Coco Chanel. French designs became extremely popular during this time, however, as there were very little shipments of these designs, only wealthy women were able to afford the pieces coming directly from France, and thus, magazines at the time capitalised on the popularity of French designs by selling sewing patterns mimicking these styles.

The popularisation of the flapper style was due to film, radio and the media. Adrian was a popular designer for Metro-Goldyn-Mayer during the 1920s-1930s, dressing silent film actresses including Clara Bow, Norma Shearer, Greta Garbo and Joan Crawford: which influenced American women's fashion. This style exposed areas that were previously hidden on the woman, including the knees, as stockings were no longer compulsory. Flappers were also known for their "boyish" appearance, sporting a bobbed hairstyle, cloche hats and tubular garments including jumper-blouses, which hid the female figure. Waistlines of dresses were dropped and no longer required the use of corsetry, and thus the popular silhouette in female fashion, became "waistless, bustless, and hipless". Other popular accessory designs included the "strap bracelet" by Cartier and Miriam Haskell's "fashion jewellery". Not all flapper fashion was consistent, as hemlines of dresses changed each year: in 1923 gowns were almost floor length whilst in 1925 they became knee length.

The term flapper, initially described young, working-class women but overtime it was used to describe any young women who challenged the social standards. Zelda Fitzgerald, the wife of Modernist author F. Scott Fitzgerald, a writer and socialite, became a popular figure. Fitzgerald's novel, Save Me the Waltz (1932), popularised the sentiment that "a woman can do anything a man can do" without compromising femininity. Social conservatives criticised this style, associating it with what they viewed as a decline in female morality. The flapper became stereotyped as a woman who "smoked, drank, swore, drove fast, professed free love, and used makeup," and exercised sexual independence.
