= Ladies' Automobile Club =

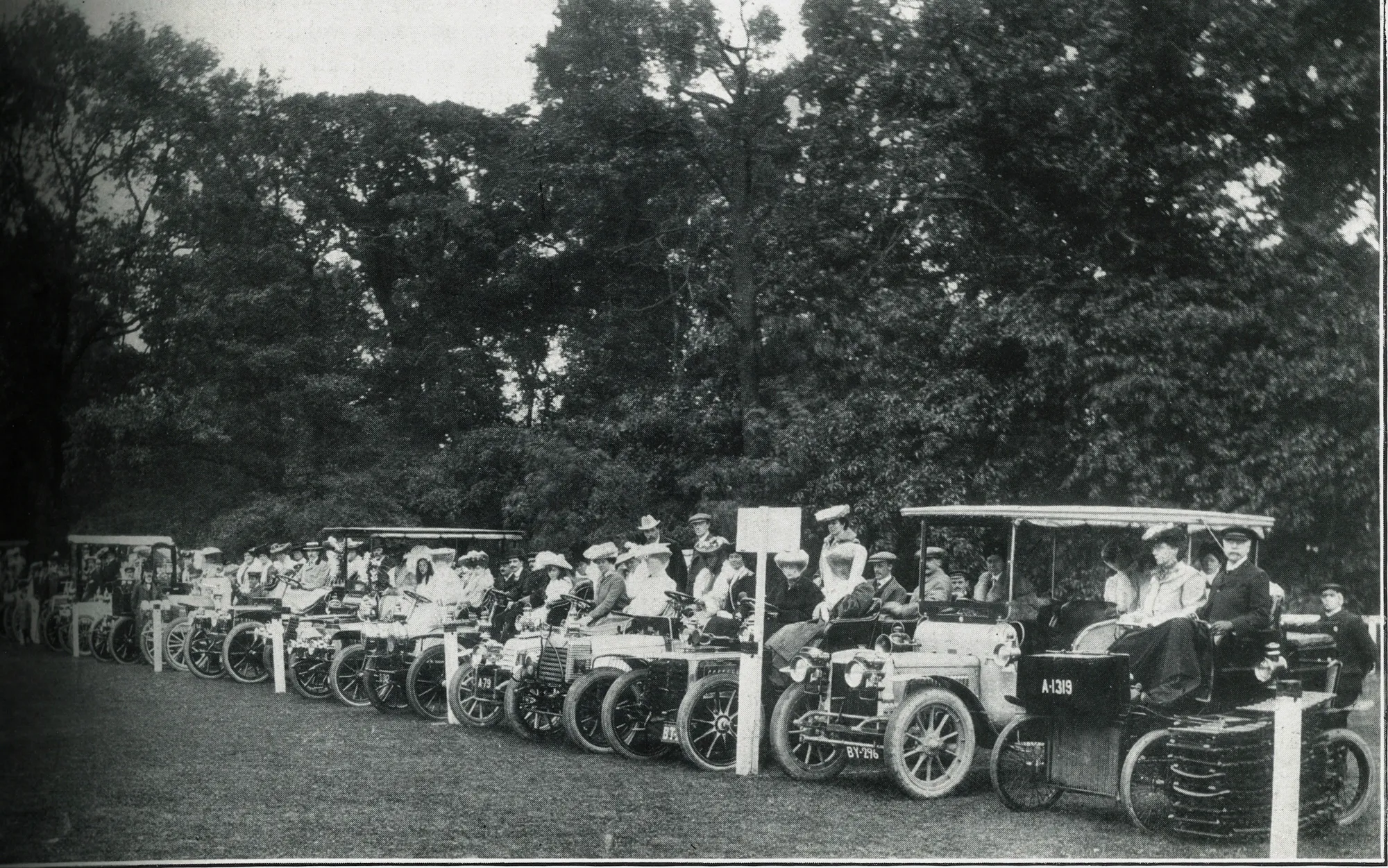
- Merged into: with Royal Automobile Club
- Formation: 1903
- Founder: Lady Cecil Scott Montagu
- Type: Car club
- Headquarters: Picadilly then Claridges

The Ladies' Automobile Club was formed by a group of aristocratic women in 1903. The club continued until the 1920s when it was absorbed by the Royal Automobile Club.

== History ==
In October 1899 Florence Wallace Pomeroy, Viscountess Harberton, who was a campaigner for women's dress reform, hosted the first attempt to set up a Ladies Automobile Club, at her London home. She invited Louise Bazalgette, who was an enthusiast for driving who boasted of travelling over 2,000 miles. One of Bazelgette's trips was from London to Southampton and this was a record for a woman. Pomeroy's proposal did not gather sufficient support and a Ladies Automobile Club was not established until 1903 (and Bazalgette was not involved).

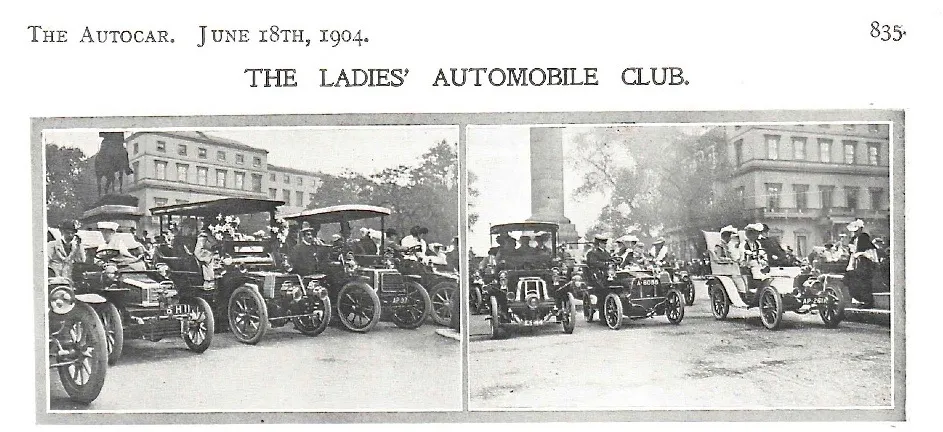
The Autocar shows the Ladies Automobile Club lining up for their first club run on 18 June 1904

Lady Cecil Scott Montagu formed the club in 1903. Nearly half of the fifty members who were the first to pay the two guineas' annual membership fee were women with titles. The Duchess of Sutherland was the inaugural President and Ada Annie Watney and Edith Vane-Tempest-Stewart, Marchioness of Londonderry were founders and members of the first committee of the Ladies Automobile Club with the American Kate d'Esterre-Hughes as secretary.

The club was required because the Automobile Club that was based in London would only allow men to join. The discrimination was needed (said the club) because of the large number of women who wanted to join and because the existing members needed to smoke everywhere in the club's building.

The new club for ladies was based at a hotel in Piccadilly but it moved after six months to Claridge's where the club was given its own entrance. In 1904 the club became a limited company and it had 300 members and an affiliation agreed with the Automobile Club of Great Britain and Ireland. On 9 June the club held its first run with over 50 vehicles taking part in a short run from the Athenaeum Club through London to the Ranelagh Club for afternoon tea.

== Early members ==
An early member, Victoria Woodhull, was said to be the first woman car driver in London's Hyde Park.

The balloonist May Assheton Harbord was a member of the Ladies Automobile Club from about 1909.

== Charity and events ==
The club organised trips and games using the cars. Talks were arranged with guests including the founder's husband, Lord Montenu, Charles Rolls and Filson Young. In 1912 the club took the unusual step of funding a hospital bed that was reserved for people injured by cars. They encouraged the Royal Automobile Club and the later formed Automobile Association to follow their lead. After the war broke out, they funded an ambulance that was specially built for them by coachbuilders.

The club continued until the 1920s when it was absorbed by the Royal Automobile Club.

== Legacy ==
In 2024 the London to Brighton Veteran Car Run celebrated 120 years since the ("circa 1904") formation of the Ladies' Automobile Club.
