= National Dress Reform Association =

National Dress Reform Association (NDRA) was an American association in support of the Victorian dress reform, founded in 1856 and dissolved in 1865.

It was founded in February 1856 by the hydropathist James Caleb Jackson. Many of its members were hydropathists, who supported the Bloomers and a reform of women's dress for health reasons, and it was given support by many other health and sports organisations, from the contemporary women's movement, as well as by religious organisations who disliked fashion. The NDRA published information, arranged exhibitions and speeches. The campaign was given great publicity for the first couple of years after its foundation, and attracted members from almost every state.

Lydia Sayer Hasbrouck founded the periodical The Sibyl, which became an organ of the NDRA, of which Hasbrouck was a member and later (1863–65) the president. Among other things, it published the names of almost a thousand women nationwide who had adopted the reform dress.

The campaign, however, failed, and the NDRA was dissolved in 1865. The dress reform movement resumed nationwide organisation again in the American Free Dress League in 1874.

== See also ==
- Rational Dress Society
- Svenska drägtreformföreningen
- Artistic Dress movement
