= Union suit =

One-piece underwear

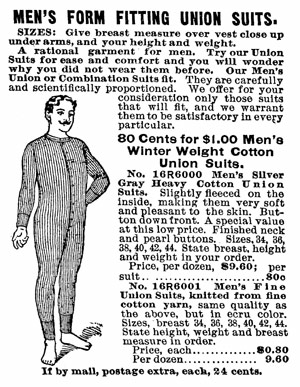
A union suit from the 1902 Sears, Roebuck catalog

A union suit is a type of one-piece long underwear, most often associated with menswear in the late 19th and early 20th centuries.

== History ==
Created in Utica, New York, United States, it originated as women's wear during the 19th-century United States clothing reform efforts, as an alternative to constricting garments, and soon gained popularity among men as well. The first union suit was patented in 1868 as "emancipation union under flannel". Its etymology is unclear. Possibilities include a "union" of top and bottom clothing, the Union Army, and an unknown older brand. The topic may have been considered taboo, limiting recordkeeping.

Traditionally made of red flannel with long arms and long legs, it buttoned up the front and had a button-up flap on the rear covering the buttocks (colloquially known as the "access hatch", "drop seat", "fireman's flap", "crap flap", and other names). Depending on the size, some union suits can have a dozen buttons on the front to be fastened through buttonholes from the neck down to the groin area.

In Britain, this garment has often been known as "combinations". When made from the traditional wool as recommended by Gustav Jäger, these are "woolly combinations"—sometimes abbreviated to "woolly coms". In the Western US, they are known as "long handles" or "long johns".

Union suits are still commercially available, and come in both summer weight (white) and thermal-wear winter weight (red), but because of their long association with "old fashioned" usage, and presumed "unsophisticated" rural wearers, they may also be considered somewhat comical. The rear flap is particularly associated with humor, and in film and television the appearance of a red union suit, viewed from behind, is a form of mild toilet humor.

== Cultural references ==
The union suit makes an appearance in Louisa May Alcott's 1875 book Eight Cousins, as a preferred alternative to corsetry under the name 'Liberty Suit'.

In (Beverly Cleary's 1951) book, Ellen Tebbits is mentioned as wearing a union suit

In Dashiell Hammett's 1930 novel The Maltese Falcon, private-eye Sam Spade "put(s) on a thin white union-suit".

Union suits are referred to several times in Laura Ingalls Wilder's Little House on the Prairie books (1932–1971) about her family's pioneer life during the late 19th century in the United States.

The union suit is mentioned in Harper Lee's 1960 novel, To Kill A Mockingbird, which is set in the rural American South in the years 1933–35.

Buddy Ebsen wore a red union suit in the 1964 comedy Western film Mail Order Bride.

In the 1985 western movie Silverado, Kevin Kline's character Paden wears one after his horse, clothes, pistols and hat have been stolen. In a shootout with one of the thieves a bullet pierces one of the trouser legs.

Dave Lister, a character from the British sci-fi sitcom Red Dwarf, which aired on BBC Two between 1988 and 1999, can be seen wearing a union suit at various points throughout the series.

The union suit appears in the 2003 film Cold Mountain, which is set during the American Civil War (1861–1865).

In the HBO series Deadwood (2004–2006), which won an Emmy for costume design, and the sequel film Deadwood: The Movie (2019), the character of Al Swearengen (played by Ian McShane) is frequently seen in a union suit. He wears only the union suit in private, and when getting dressed in the morning, dons a matching three-piece suit over it. Although the union suit is visible even with the vest, this appears to be adequate for daily wear. For more formal occasions, the character added a dress shirt over the union suit, and a cravat or bow tie.

In the 2010 expansion Undead Nightmare for the 19th century Western-themed game Red Dead Redemption, the player begins play wearing a union suit and can continue to wear it throughout the game, if desired. The outfit is available in the prequel Red Dead Redemption 2.

In the opening to the second season of the Apple TV+ series Severance in 2025, the character of Mark Scout wears a red union suit. In the first season opening, in 2022, he wore red two-piece pajamas, echoing the procedure that severed his "innie" life as an office worker from his "outie" waking life.

Union suits, especially the rear flap, are used for comedic effect in Back to the Future Part III (1990), in the 1999 movie adaptation of The Wild Wild West, in 'the TV series Rugrats (1991–2021), and in the Family Guy episode "No Meals on Wheels" which originally aired in 2007.

== Gallery ==
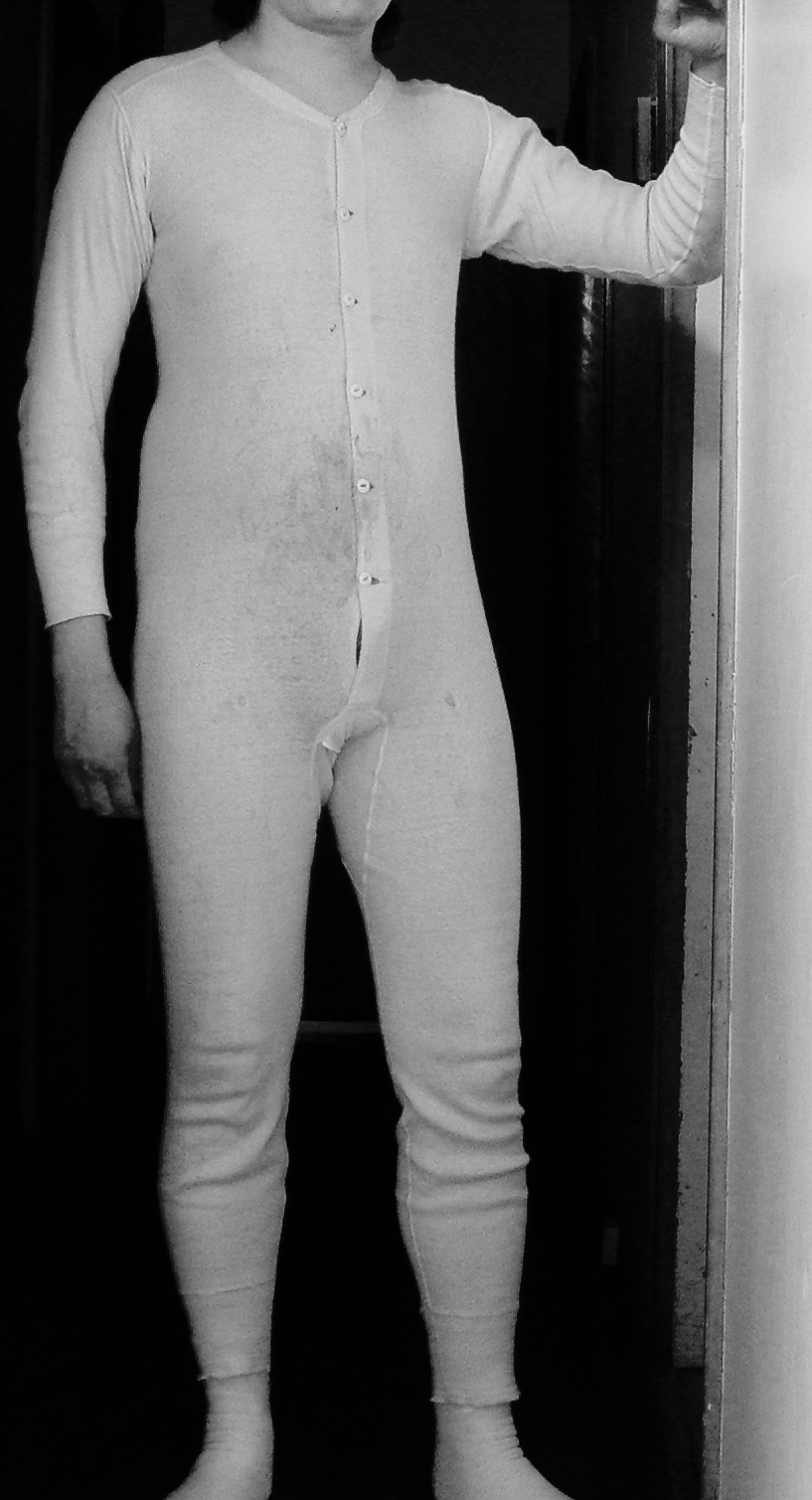
Union suit (front)

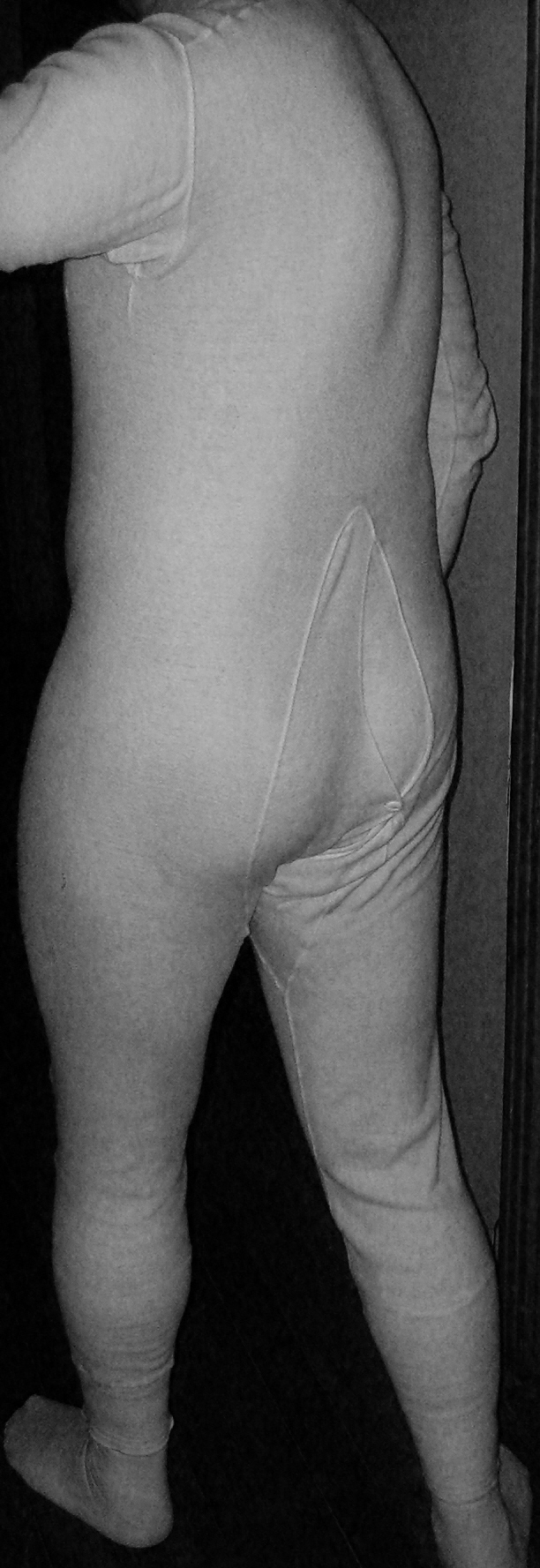
Union suit (back)

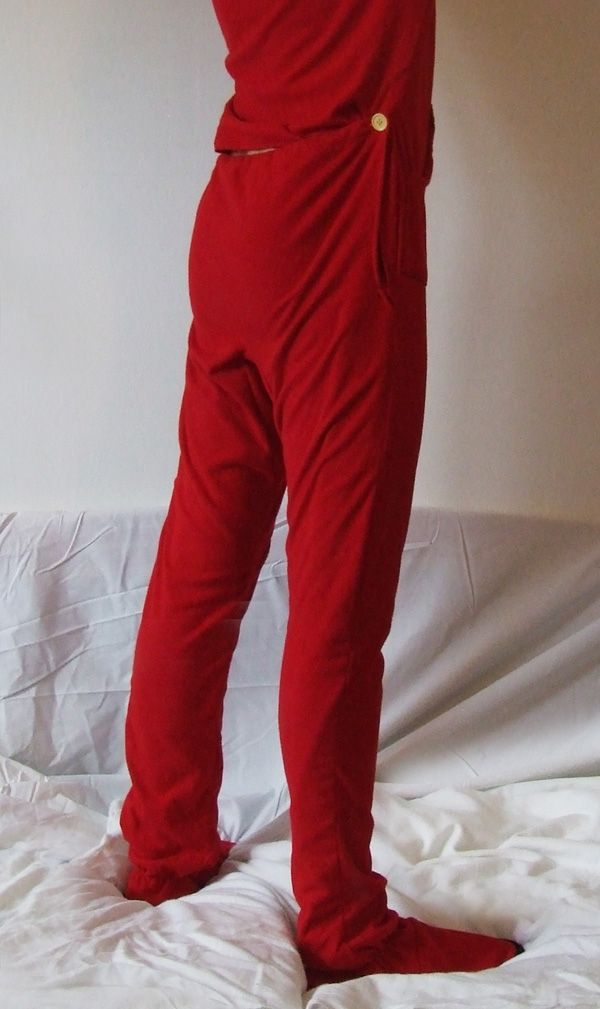
Union suit (drop-seat version)

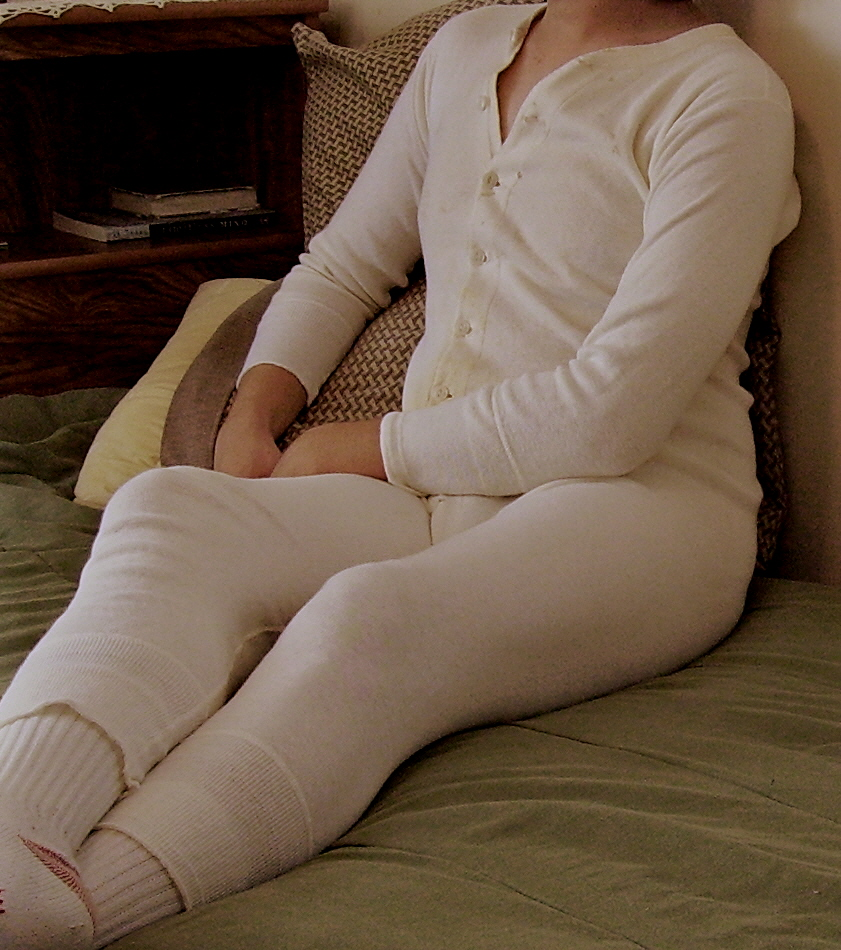
Worn as comfortable, if informal, lounge wear

== See also ==
- Victorian dress reform
- Onesie (jumpsuit)
