= May Assheton Harbord =

First woman to obtain an Aeronaut's Certificate in the UK

May Assheton Harbord Hon.
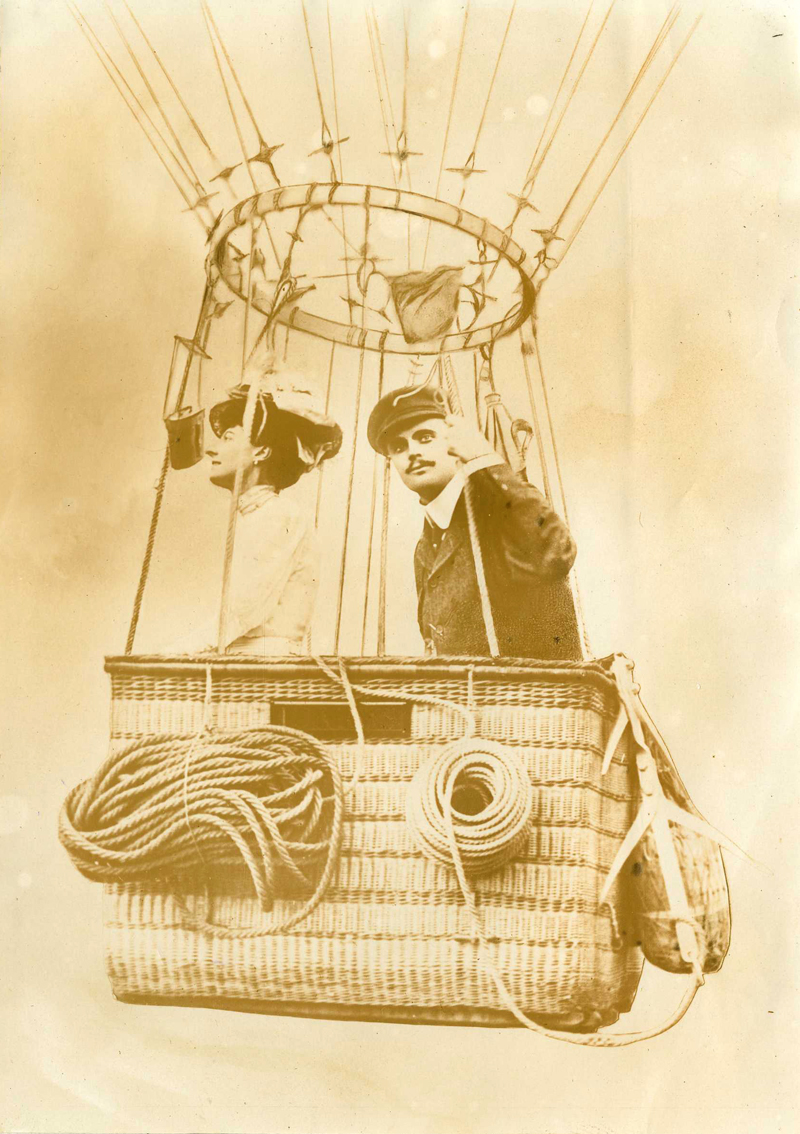
- C.S. Rolls and Hon. Mrs Assheton Harbord
- Born: May Constance Cuningham; 6 June 1866; Simla, British India
- Died: 7 February 1928 (aged 61)
- Notable work: Flying

May Constance Assheton Harbord (6 June 1866 – 7 February 1928), was the first woman to obtain an Aeronaut's Certificate in the United Kingdom, in 1912.

== Family ==
May Constance Cuningham was born in Shimla, India on 6 June 1866, the daughter of James Macnab Cuningham and his wife Mary Falconer McRae (d.1883). Her father was Surgeon General in the Indian Medical Service.

She married the Melbourne based Arthur Blackwood in 1885 though he left her a widow. She was known as May Blackwood during this time. She went on to marry Hon. Assheton Edward Harbord, son of Charles Harbord, 5th Baron Suffield on 3 April 1905.

== Ballooning ==
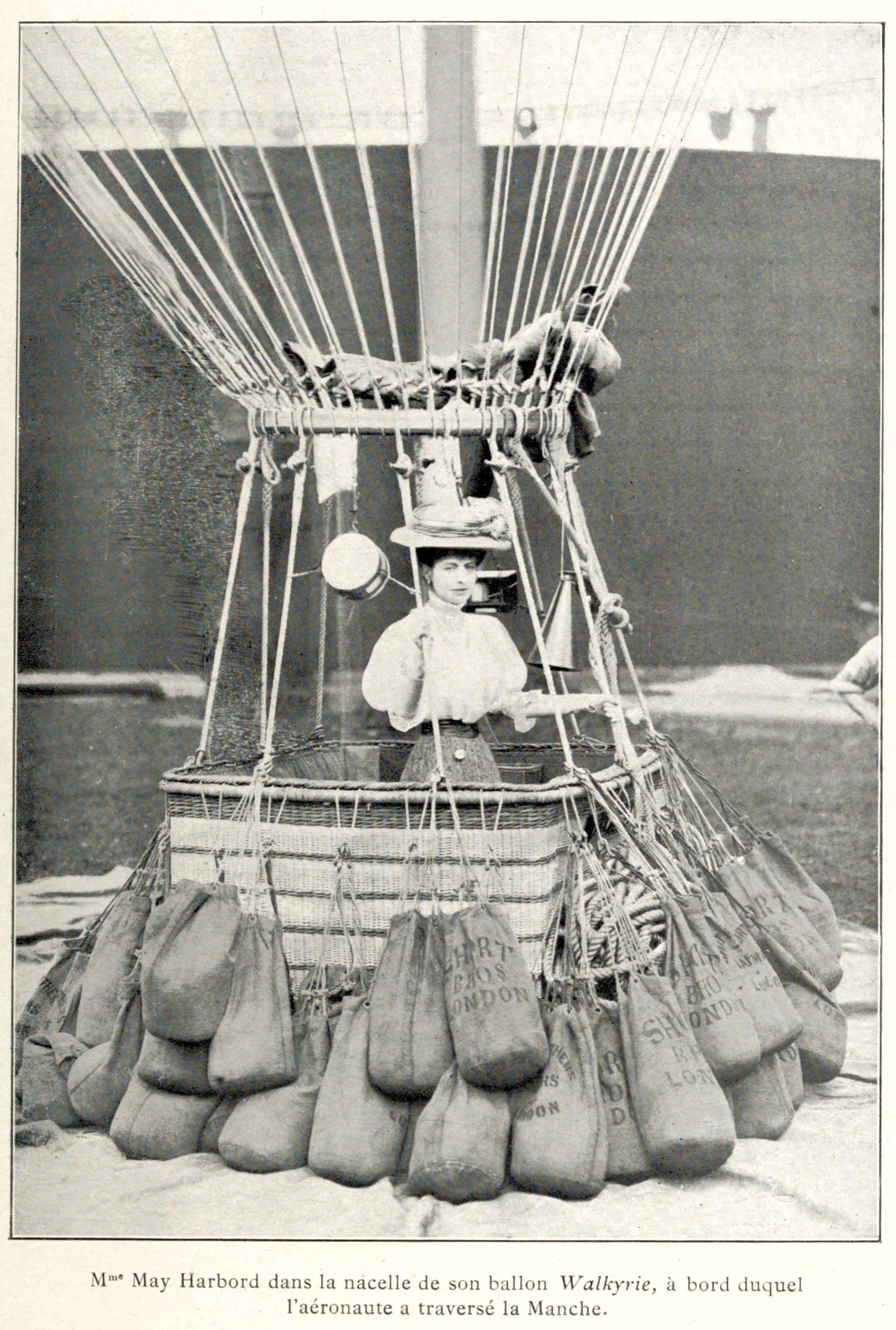
May Harbord in her balloon Valkyrie, in which she crossed the English Channel

Mrs Assheton Harbord made her name as a balloonist and aeronaut after a social trip in a balloon in May 1906. She went on to become a regular adventurer in balloons, crossing the English Channel repeatedly. One trip ended with her being thrown out of the balloon on landing due to rough weather, following which she declared that "I can claim, therefore to be the only woman who has landed on the Continent on her head".

She became very well known for her exploits. May Harbord flew regularly, often with John and Eleanor Shelley-Rolls, another keen balloonist and sister of Charles Rolls. She owned two balloons which she kept near Battersea gas works. She bought the first balloon, the 45,000 cu.ft. 'Nebula' in the winter of 1906/7 and flew it for the first time on 12 January 1907, with Mr and Miss Moore-Brabazon as passengers, making that flight the first in the UK by a woman in her own balloon. Assheton Harbord was awarded the "Mortimer Singer Plate" in 1909 for the longest balloon journey in July, August or September in 1908. She took part in the Aero Club Challenge Cup and won the Krabbe Cup.

She drove her own car and was convicted of speeding at least four times by 1911. Assheton Harbord was a member of the Ladies Automobile Club from about 1909 and also served in the Volunteer Motor Mobilisation Corps in 1915.

She died in 1928.
