= Florence Wallace Pomeroy, Viscountess Harberton =

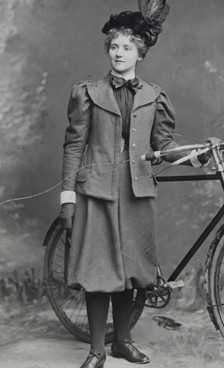
- Born: Florence Wallace Legge; 14 June 1843; Belfast
- Died: 30 April 1911 (aged 67); Onslow Square, South Kensington
- Occupation: Campaigner for dress reform

Florence Wallace Pomeroy, Viscountess Harberton (née Wallace Legge; 14 June 1843 – 30 April 1911) was a British campaigner for dress reform.

== Life ==
She was born at Malone House in Belfast, the daughter of wealthy landowner William Wallace Legge (died 1868), a JP and DL for County Antrim, and his wife, Eleanor Wilkie Forster. She married James Spencer Pomeroy (1836–1912) on 2 April 1861, and in 1862 she became Viscountess Harberton when he became the 6th Viscount Harberton. They had four children, Aline Florence, Hilda Evelyn, Ernest Arthur George (1867–1944, 7th Viscount), and Ralph Legge (1869–1956, 8th Viscount).

Pomeroy became involved in the campaign for dress reform in 1880, after the death of her daughter Aline. In 1883 she became President of the Rational Dress Society (which she possibly co-founded in 1881), which described the attributes of "perfect" dress as:

1. Freedom of Movement.
2. Absence of pressure over any part of the body.
3. Not more weight than is necessary for warmth, and both weight and warmth evenly distributed.
4. Grace and beauty combined with comfort and convenience.
5. Not departing too conspicuously from the ordinary dress of the time.

In 1893, The Guardian mentioned her "Short Skirts League" whose members would wear skirts of at least 5 inches (130 mm) above the ground when out walking. In 1898, she founded the Rational Dress League.

She was a keen cyclist, and one of her most celebrated moments was when the landlady of the Hautboy Inn at Ockham, Surrey, refused to serve her because she was wearing her "rational dress" of baggy knickerbockers instead of a skirt. Pomeroy sued the landlady, but lost the case because she had been offered service in an alternative room, albeit one occupied by several men. The Cycling UK (formerly the Cycle Touring Club (CTC), which removed its badge of approval from the Hautboy at the time) says that "the case hit the national headlines, made CTC a lot of friends, led to more women's cycling groups, and was a milestone on the road to female emancipation".

In October 1899 she hosted the first attempt to set up a Ladies Automobile Club, at her London home. There was not sufficient support at that time and a club of that name was not successfully established until 1903.

In later years she took up the cause of women's suffrage. Her obituary in The Times says that she had written pieces for that newspaper to express the view that women could do more of the work currently done by men, and had also campaigned for reforms to prevent tuberculosis. It ended by saying that:

Thus by the death of Lady Harberton the "pioneer women" of the day lose a spirited, energetic and daring supporter and society a remarkable personality".

She died in Onslow Square, South Kensington, aged 67.
