= Inès Gaches-Sarraute =

French physician and corsetière

Inès Gaches-Sarraute (1853–1928) was a French physician and corsetière. She was the inventor of the 'health corset', later called the 'S-bend' corset.

== Life ==
Concerned at the gynaecological effects of corsets on women, Gaches-Sarraute began pamphleteering on the subject in the 1890s. Her novel design of corset, introduced in her 1900 book, helped bring about a change in corset fashions in the early twentieth century.

== Works ==
- L'Exposition d'hygiène urbaine. 1886.
- Etude du corset au point de vue de l'hygiène du vêtement de la femme. G. Masson, 1895.
- L'hygiène du corset. 1896.
- Le Corset: Étude physiologique et pratique. Paris, 1900.
