= The Philosophy of Dress =

1885 essay by Oscar Wilde

The Philosophy of Dress is an essay by Oscar Wilde that appeared in the New-York Tribune in 1885. The essay remained unknown to scholarship until 2012 when it was rediscovered and published for the first time in book form by Wilde historian John Cooper in Oscar Wilde On Dress (CSM Press, 2013), making it the only previously unknown work that Wilde intended for publication to have been released since he died in 1900.

The essay is Wilde's treatise on Victorian dress reform and its relationship to art in which he expands on his public lecture entitled Dress, which was one of several lectures given in Great Britain and Ireland between 1883 and 1888. A significance of The Philosophy of Dress is that Wilde's only previously published prose works had been a handful of short reviews and letters that appeared in journals or newspapers. With this essay Wilde announced himself as a commercial writer: it was the first work by him prepared as a composition for specific and separate publication, and it is the only piece of his journalism (out of over 150 examples) that was copyrighted.

In the essay is the first occurrence in print of Wilde's quotation: "A fashion is merely a form of ugliness so absolutely unbearable that we have to alter it every six months!"
