= Long underwear =

Underwear with long legs and long sleeves

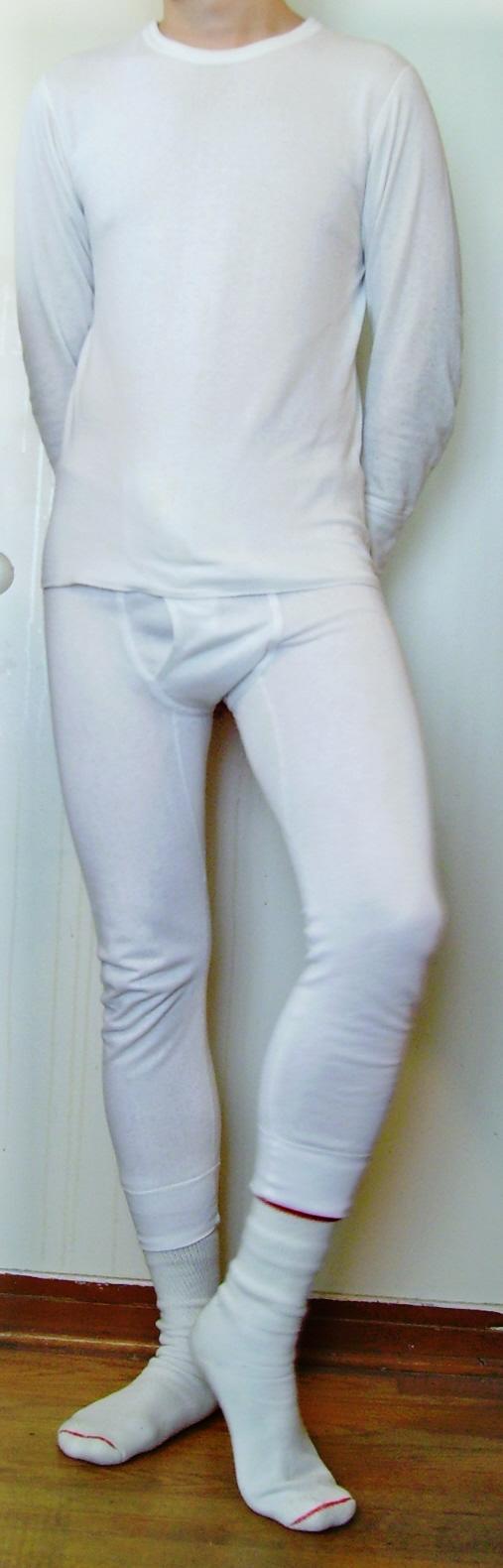
Two-piece long underwear

Long underwear, also called long johns or thermal underwear, is underwear with long legs and long sleeves that is normally worn during cold weather. It is commonly worn by people under their clothes in colder climates.

In the United States, it is usually made from a cotton or cotton-polyester-blend fabric with a waffle weave texture, although some varieties are also made from flannel, particularly the union suit, while many newer varieties are made from polyester, such as the Capilene trade name.

Long underwear may also be made from synthetic materials, as with any other underwear. Some models might include a thin layer of polyester to transport moisture away from the skin. Wool, in addition to being fire retardant, provides highly effective insulation and will keep its insulating properties even when wet, unlike cotton.

== Etymology of long johns ==
The manufacturing foundations of long johns may lie in Derbyshire, England, at John Smedley's Lea Mills, located in Matlock. The company has a 225-year heritage and is said to have created the garment, which may have been named after the late-19th-century heavyweight boxer John L. Sullivan or John Smedley II himself; the company still produces long johns.

In 2004, Michael Quinion, a British etymologist and writer, postulated that the john in the item of apparel may be a reference to Sullivan, who wore a similar-looking garment in the ring. This explanation, however, is uncertain and the term's origin is ultimately unknown.

It has also been posed that the term is an approximation of the French longues jambes, which translates to 'long legs.'

== History of long johns ==
Long johns were first introduced into England in the 17th century, but did not become popular as sleepwear until the 18th century.

It was first used as loungewear but later became popular in Truro, Nova Scotia. In 1898, Myles and his brother John had developed a product called Stanfield's Unshrinkable Underwear for their garment manufacturing company. He and his brother started with non-shrinking cotton underwear and applied for a patent for long johns on December 7, 1915.

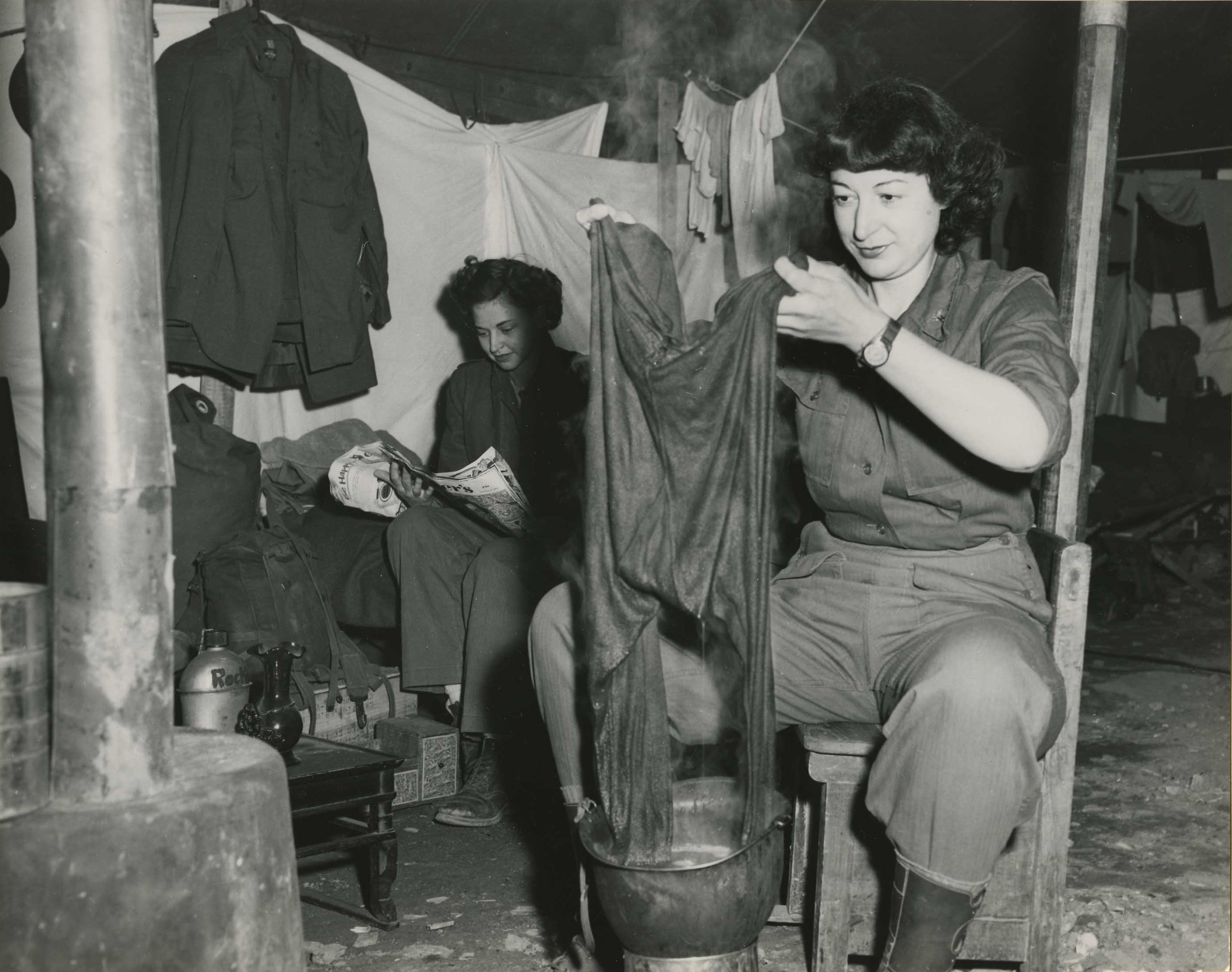
Washing long underwear

From 1914 to mid-1918, the item of underwear most purchased by various military forces was a garment known as a union suit; it is a one-piece form of underwear covering body and legs and was the prototype of the Chinese qiuyi (秋衣), the top part, and qiuku (秋裤), the bottom part. After 1918, countries returned to producing for civilians.

Demand declined following the spread of central heating and more frequent baths or showers.

== Long underwear in other countries ==
=== China ===
In China, people use separate words to refer to the two parts of long underwear, and the terms vary across the country. In the northern part, people refer to the top as xianyi and the bottom as xianku. People living south of the Yellow River and north of the Yangtze River refer to the top as qiuyi and the bottom as qiuku. People living south of the Yangtze River call the top mianmao yi and the bottom mianmao ku.

In the early 2010s, a myth spread through Chinese social media that long underwear was part of the Soviet Union's conspiracy to prevent Chinese military powers from invading Soviet soil in the far east. The myth suggested that the Soviet Union believes that long underwear reduces Chinese soldiers' adaptability in cold climates based on the since-debunked theory of Lysenkoism popular in the mid-20th century.
