= 1860s in Western fashion =

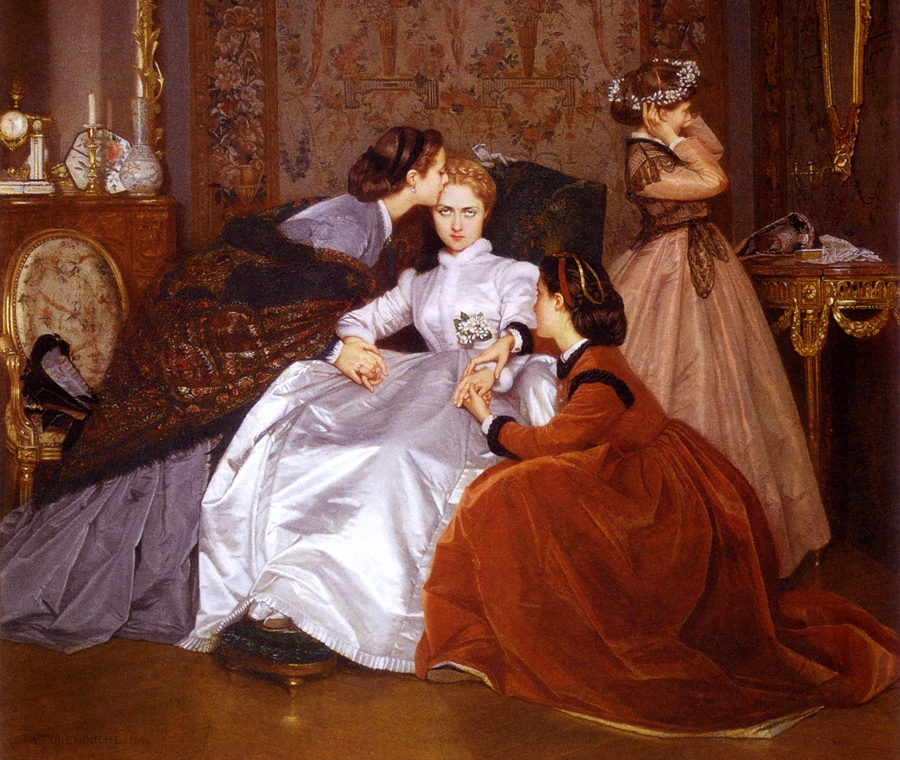
Fashions of the 1860s include square paisley shawls folded on the diagonal and full skirts held out by crinolines. Auguste Toulmouche's Reluctant Bride of 1866 wears white satin, and her friend tries on her bridal wreath of orange blossoms.

1860s fashion in European and European-influenced countries is characterized by extremely full-skirted women's fashions relying on crinolines and hoops and the emergence of "alternative fashions" under the influence of the Artistic Dress movement.

In men's fashion, the three-piece ditto suit of sack coat, waistcoat, and trousers in the same fabric emerged as a novelty.

== Women's fashions ==
=== Colors ===
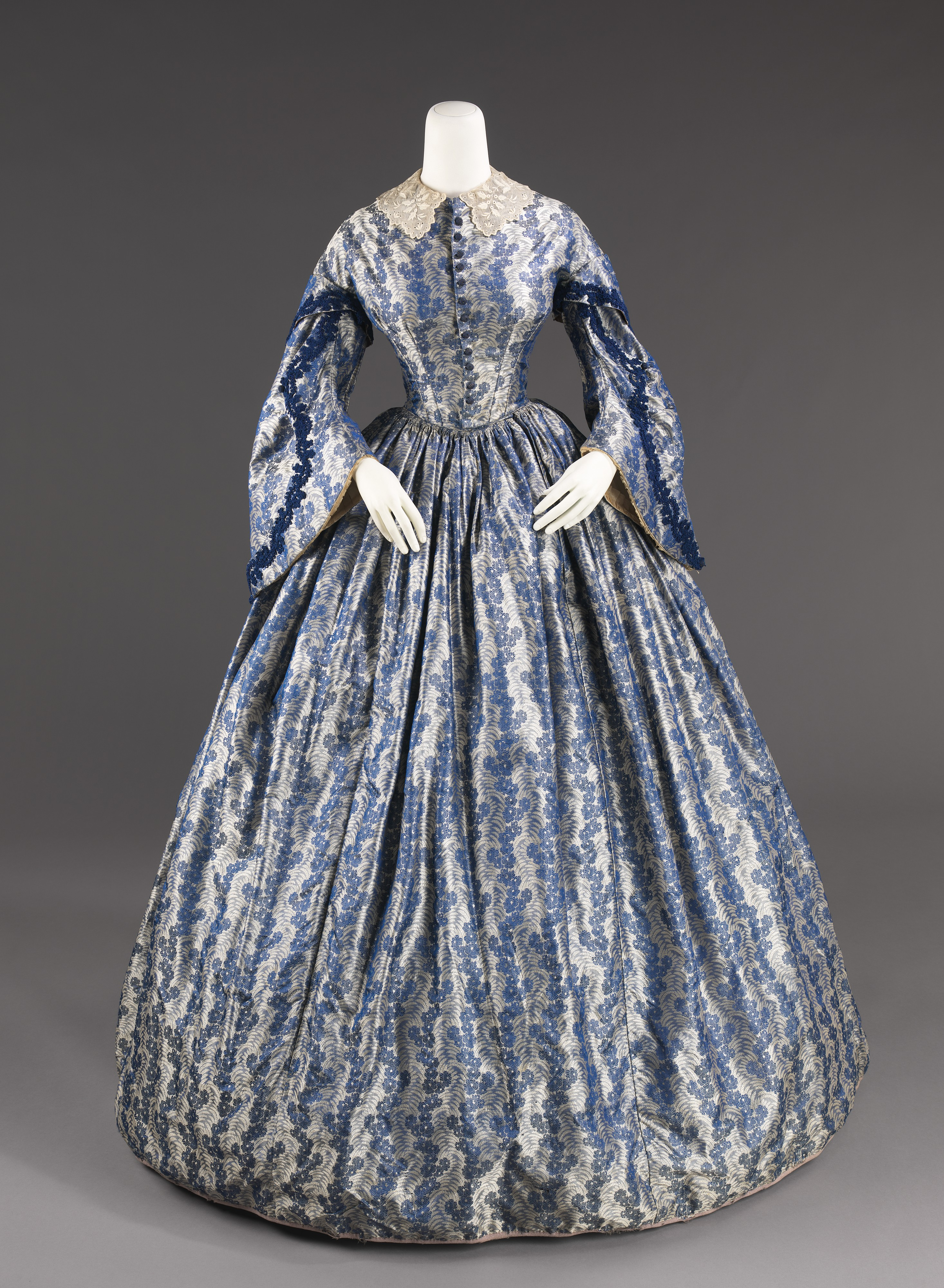
A blue silk wedding dress from c. 1860

Mauveine Aniline dyes (first chemical dyes) were discovered in 1856 and were quickly utilized to make use of fashionable colors to fabrics. The first ones were mauve and bright purple. In 1860, two fashionable brilliant pink aniline dyes were named after battles in Italy's fight for independence: magenta, named after the Italian town of Magenta, Lombardy, and the similar solferino, named after Solferino. Magenta was popularized in England by the Duchess of Sutherland after she was appealed to by the Spitalfields silk weavers.

=== Gowns ===
By the early 1860s, skirts had reached their ultimate width. After about 1862 the silhouette of the crinoline changed and rather than being bell-shaped it was now flatter at the front and projected out more behind. This large area was largely occupied by all manner of decoration. Puffs and strips could cover much of the skirt. There could be so many flounces that the material of the skirt itself was hardly visible. Lace again became popular and was used all over the dress. Any part of the dress could also be embroidered in silver or gold. This massive construct of a dress required gauze lining to stiffen it, as well as multiple starched petticoats. Even the clothes women would ride horses in received these sorts of embellishments.

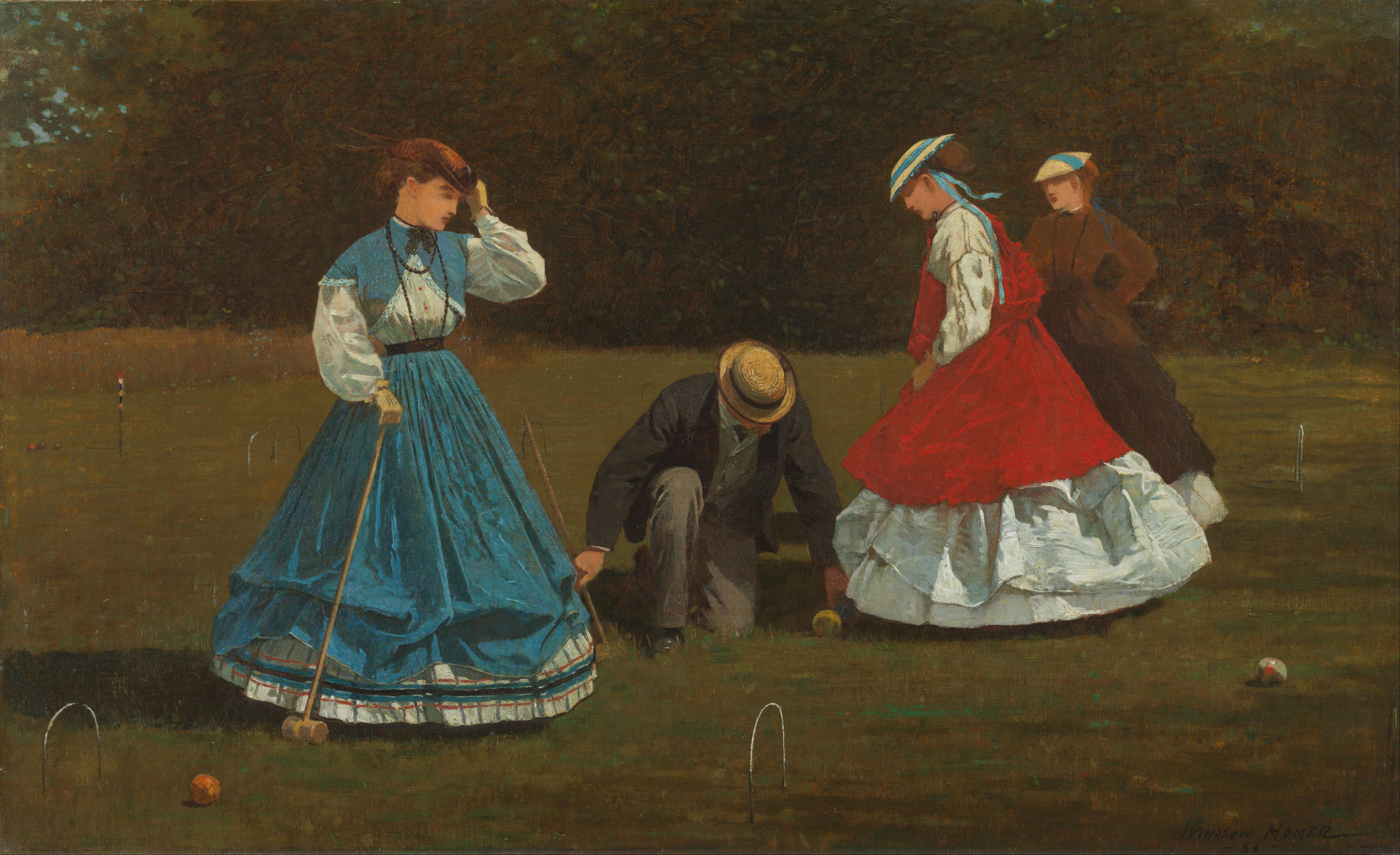
Croquet players of 1864 loop their skirts up from floor-length over hooped petticoats. Small hats with ribbon streamers were very popular for young women in the mid-1860s.

Day dresses featured wide pagoda sleeves worn over undersleeves or engageantes. High necklines with lace or tatted collars or chemisettes completed the demure daytime look.

Gowns had low necklines and short sleeves, and were worn with short gloves or lace or crocheted fingerless mitts. The voluminous skirts were supported by hoops, petticoats, and or crinolines. The use of hoops was not as common until 1856, prior supporting the skirts with layers of starched petticoats. Large crinolines were probably reserved for special occasions.

Skirts were now assembled of shaped panels, since gathering a straight length of fabric could not provide the width required at the hem without unwanted bulk at the waist; this spelled the end of the brief fashion for border-printed dress fabrics.

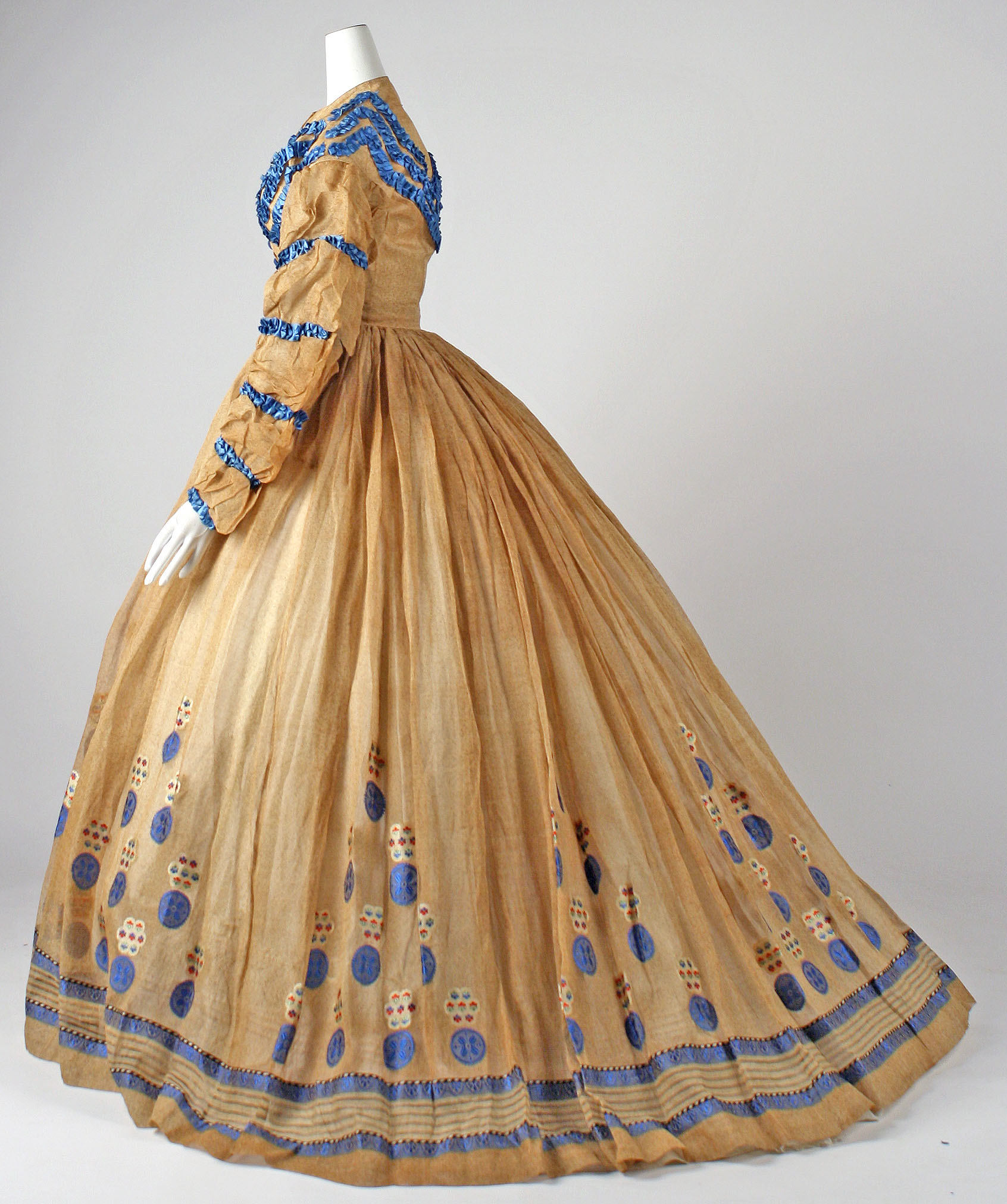
A cotton dress from c. 1865

Heavy silks in solid colors became fashionable for both day and evening wear, and a skirt might be made with two bodices, one long-sleeved and high necked for afternoon wear and one short-sleeved and low-necked for evening. The bodices themselves were often triangular, and featured a two-piece front with a closure and a three-piece back construction.

As the decade progressed, sleeves narrowed, and the circular hoops of the 1850s decreased in size at the front and sides and increased at the back. Looped up overskirts revealed matching or contrasting underskirts, a look that would reach its ultimate expression the next two decades with the rise of the bustle. Waistlines rose briefly at the end of the decade.

Fashions were adopted more slowly in America than in Europe. It was not uncommon for fashion plates to appear in American women's magazines a year or more after they appeared in Paris or London.

Long coats were impractical with the very full skirts, and the common outer garments were square shawls folded on the diagonal to make a triangle and fitted or unfitted hip-length or knee-length jackets.

Three-quarter-length capes (with or without sleeves) were also worn.

For walking, jackets were accompanied by floor-length skirts that could be looped or drawn up by means of tapes over a shorter petticoat.

=== Undergarments ===
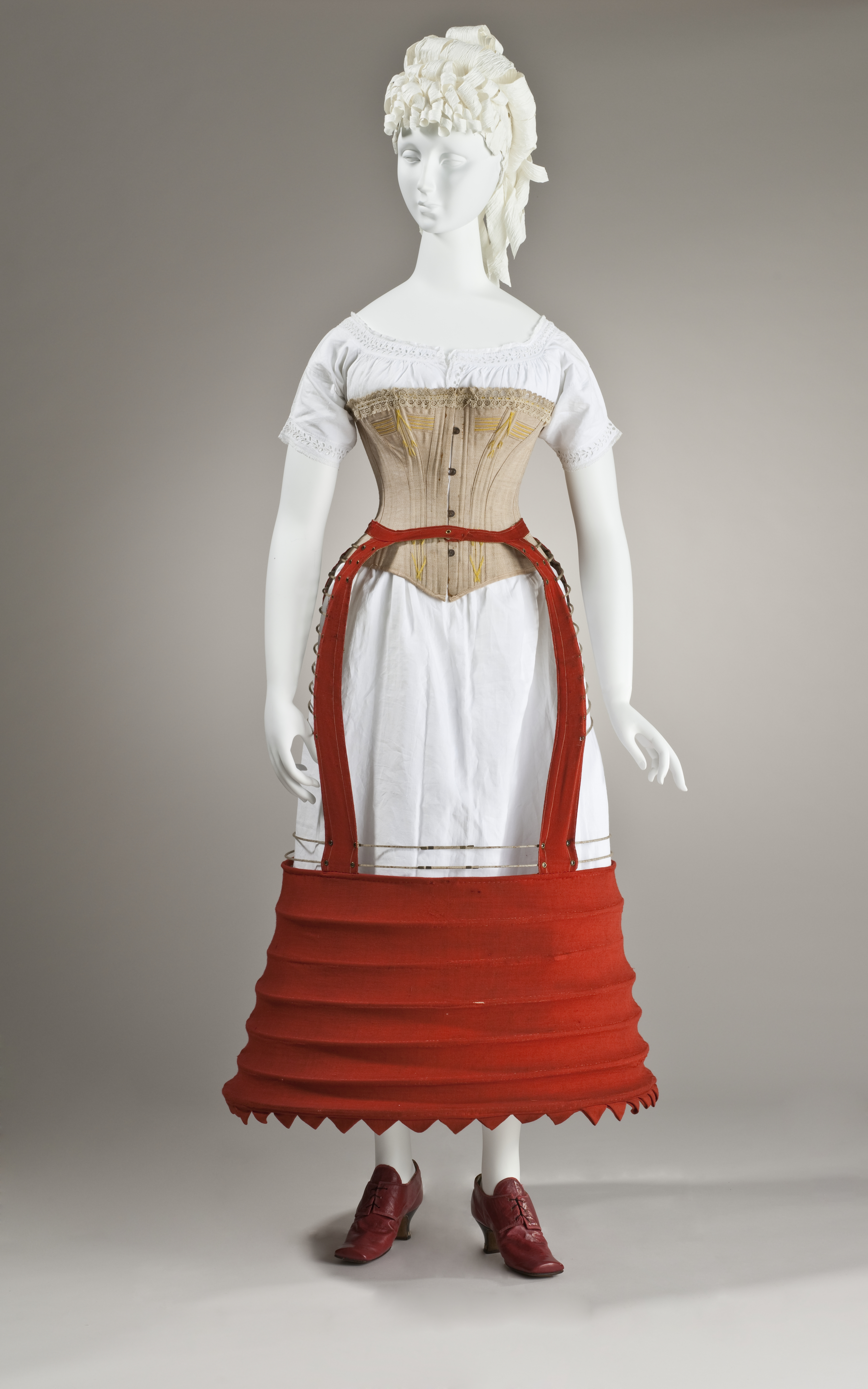
Feminine undergarments, including a linen chemise with cotton broderie anglaise and lace (c. 1850–1870); a bustle cage crinoline made of wool twill, cotton plain weave with stamped grid pattern, cotton twill tape, cotton-braid-covered steel, and metal (c. 1862–1870); and a cotton corset with cotton lace trim (c. 1865–1875)

As skirts became narrower and flatter in front, more emphasis was placed on the waist and hips. A corset was therefore used to help mold the body to the desired shape. This was achieved by making the corsets longer than before, and by constructing them from separate shaped pieces of fabric. To increase rigidity, they were reinforced with many strips of whalebone, cording, or pieces of leather. As well as making corsets more constricting, this heavy structure helped prevent them from riding up, or from wrinkling at the waist. Steam-molding also helped create a curvaceous contour. Developed by Edwin Izod in the late 1860s, the procedure involved placing a corset, wet with starch, on a steam heated copper torso form until it dried into shape. While tight lacing continued to be a hotly debated topic among moralists and physicians, most extreme descriptions came from male sexual fantasies.

The crinoline or hooped petticoat had grown to its maximum dimensions by 1860. As huge skirts began to fall from favor, around 1864, the shape of the crinoline began to change. Rather than being dome-shaped, the front and sides began to contract, leaving volume only at the back. The "American" cage, a hooped petticoat partially covered in fabric, came in bright colors made possible by the new aniline dyes. This was followed by a hybrid of the bustle and crinoline sometimes called a "crinolette". The cage structure was still attached around the waist and extended down to the ground, but only extended down the back of the wearer's legs. The crinolette itself was quickly superseded by the true bustle, which was sufficient for supporting the drapery and train at the back of the skirt. Under the corset, a chemise was worn. A chemise is typically short sleeve and knee length made of linen or cotton. The chemise and stockings worn were meant to soak up any perspiration and protecting the outer clothing. Due to the many layers of dress, the women of the southern elite would take short naps to rest from wearing their large dress and escape the harsh southern heat and the constraining whalebone corsets.

=== Military and political influences ===
The Garibaldi shirt or "Garibaldi jacket" was popularized by Empress Eugénie of France in 1860. These bright red woolen garments featured black embroidery or braid and military details. Following a visit by the Italian revolutionary Giuseppe Garibaldi to England in 1863, the shirt became all the rage there. In America, the early years of the Civil War also saw increased popularity of military-influenced styles such as Zouave jackets. These new styles were worn over a waist (blouse) or chemisette and a skirt with a belt at the natural waistline. Women's fashion overall was highly influenced by the reigning Queen Victoria of the United Kingdom.

=== Rise of haute couture ===
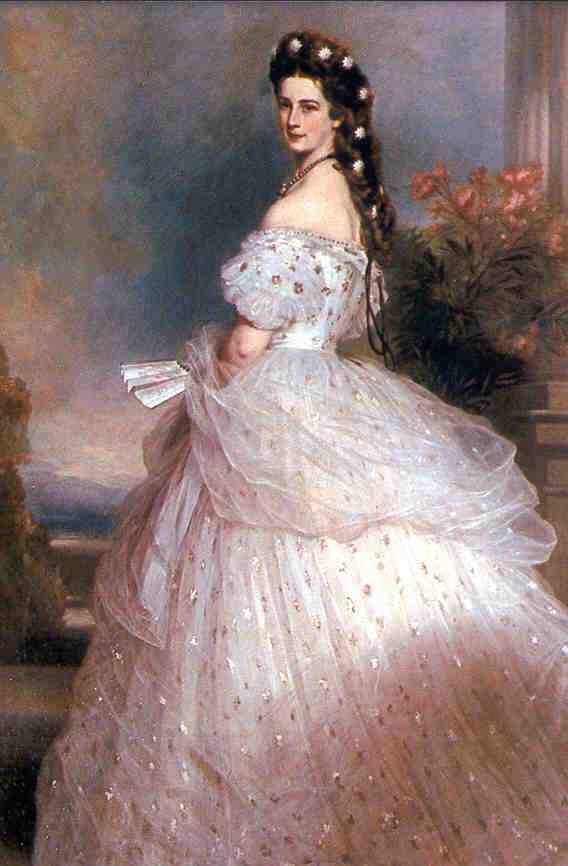
Empress Elisabeth of Austria in 1865, wearing a pink tulle gown created by Charles Frederick Worth, who is usually considered the father of haute couture

The Englishman Charles Frederick Worth had established his first fashion house in Paris in 1858. He was the first couturier, a dressmaker considered an artist, and his ability to dictate design in the 1860s led to the dominance of Parisian haute couture for the next hundred years.

=== Artistic dress ===
The followers of the Pre-Raphaelite Brotherhood and other artistic reformers objected to the elaborately trimmed confections of high fashion with their emphasis on rigid corsets and hoops as both ugly and dishonest. An "anti-fashion" for Artistic dress spread in the 1860s in literary and artistic circles, and remained an undercurrent for the rest of the century. The style was characterised by "medieval" influences such as juliette sleeves, the soft colors of vegetable dyes, narrow skirts, and simple ornamentation with hand embroidery. Material used in the southern American elite were silk, velvet, muslin and fine lawn.

=== Hairstyles and headgear ===
Hair was worn parted in the middle and smoothed, waved, or poofed over the ears, then braided or "turned up" and pinned into a roll or low bun at the back of the neck. Such styling was usually maintained by the use of hair oils and pomades. Styled hair was often further confined in decorative hairnets, especially by younger women. (NOTE: Although many modern reenactors refer to this garment as a "snood", it is not a period term for this article of clothing; snoods were something else entirely.) These hairnets were frequently made of very fine material to match the wearer's natural hair color, but occasionally more elaborate versions were made of thin strips of velvet or chenille (sometimes decorated with beads). Whether plain or resplendent, many hairnets were edged with ruchings of ribbon that would serve to adorn the crown of the wearer's head.

A composite of two fashion engravings from an early 1860s Godey's Lady's Book, showing ensembles with bonnets, richly decorated with trimmings like laces and wide ribbon ties

Fashion bonnets for outdoor wear had small brims that revealed the face. Earlier bonnets of the decade had lower brims. However, by mid-century Spoon Bonnets, which featured increasingly high brims and more elaborate trimmings, became the vogue. Bonnets were made specifically to accessorize a dress. Other less common variants, such as the Marie Stuart Bonnet, with its heart-shaped brim, and the fanchon bonnet, with its very short brim and back curtain, made appearances in the realm of fashionable headwear.

Bonnets could be made of a variety of materials. Bonnets formed from buckram and wire and covered with fashion fabric were very popular. During the warmer seasons, bonnets made of straw, woven horsehair, or gathered net were also seen. Heavier materials like velvet were favored for winter bonnets, though quilted winter hoods were much more practical and warm.

Trimmings varied according to the changing styles and whims of the individual wearer, but most bonnets of the period followed some general rules with regards to form. Rows of gathered net lining the brim was a fashion carry-over from the decade before, and a decorative curtain (also referred to as a "bavolet") appeared on most bonnets in order to shade the wearer's neck and accommodate for the low hairstyles. Another standard of 1860s bonnets is bonnet ties. There were often two sets, a thin pair of "utility ties" to take the strain of tying the bonnet, and another set of wide ties of silk or another fancy material. These rich ties were tied below the chin in a bow or left untied to show off the beautiful print or material.

Bonnets fell out of fashion over the decade in favor of small hats.

=== Style gallery 1860–1864 ===
1 – c. 1860

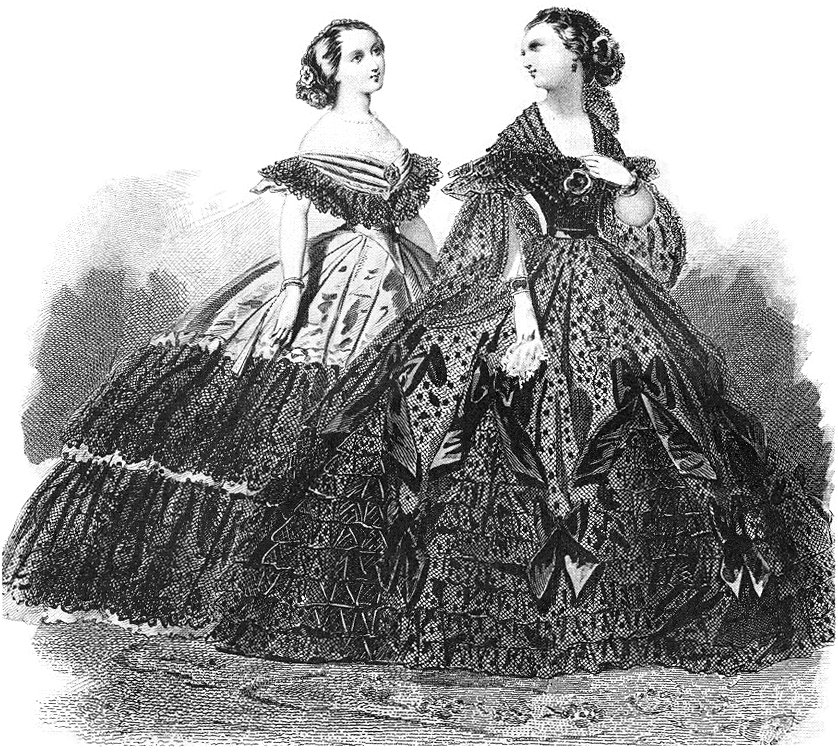
2 – early 1860s

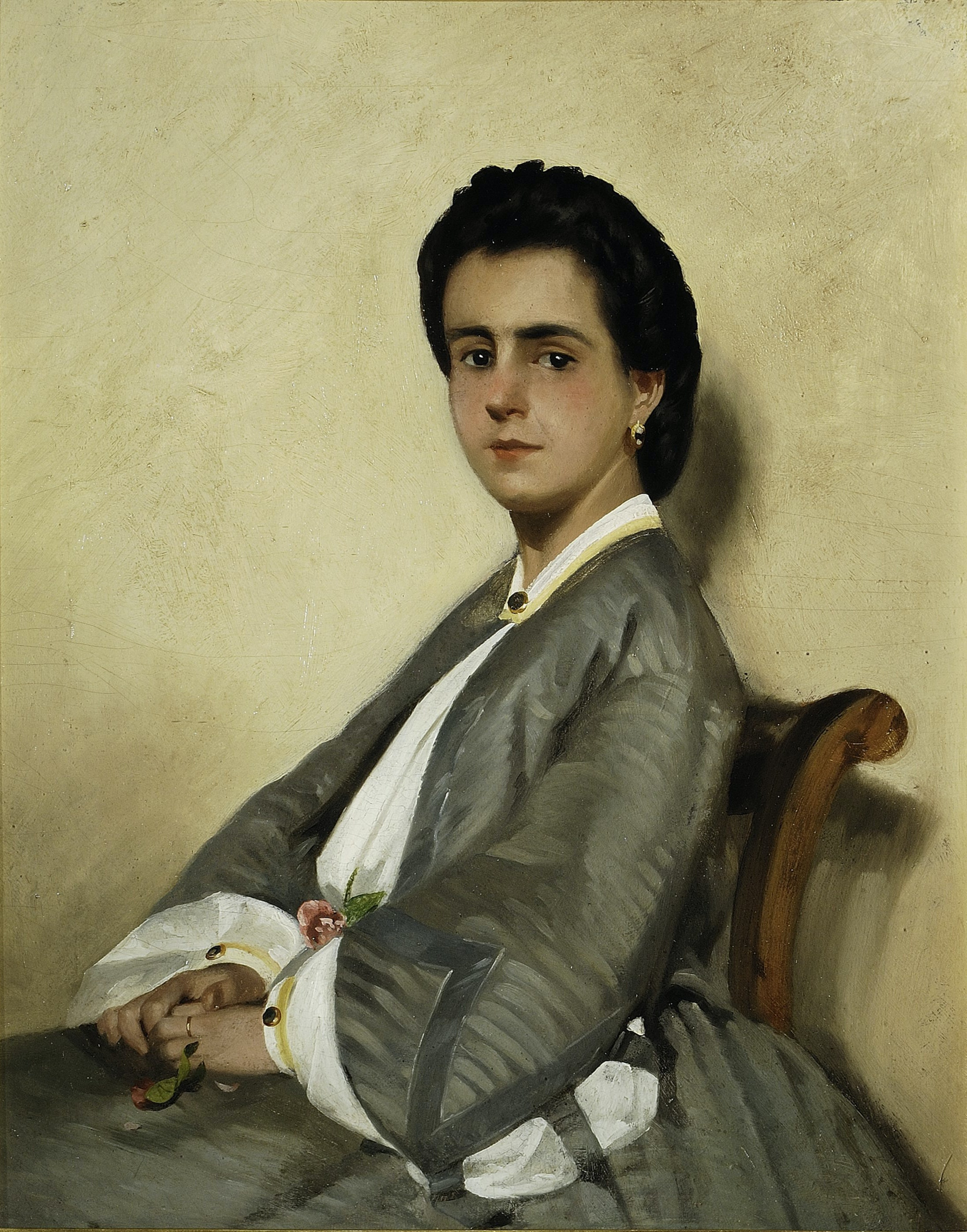
3 – 1861

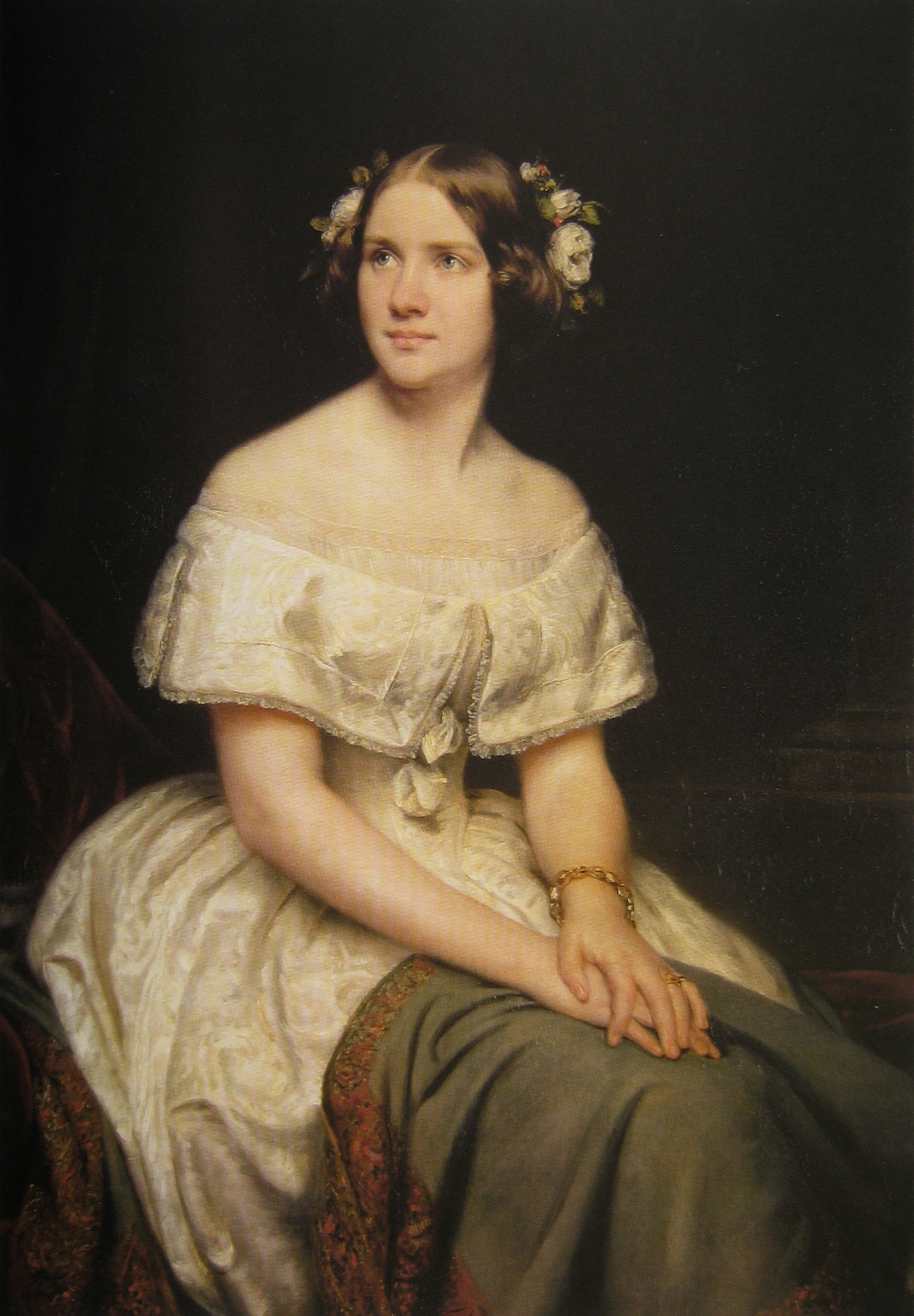
4 – 1862

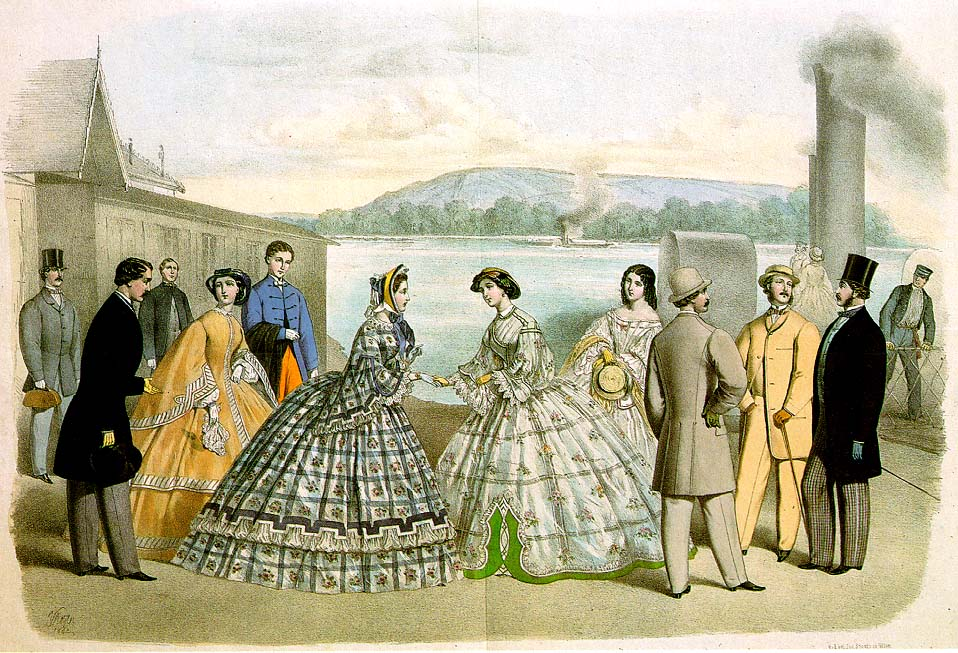
5 – 1862

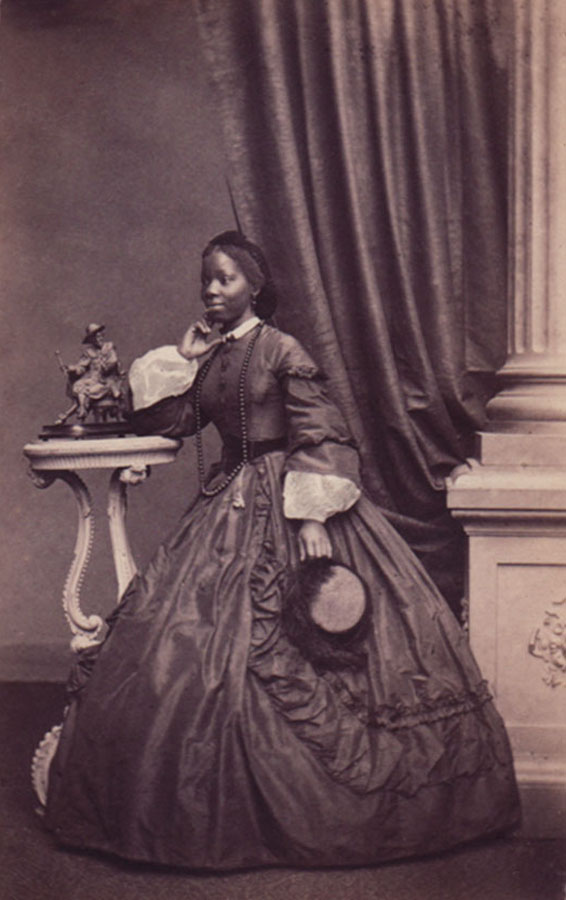
6 – 1862

7 – 1862

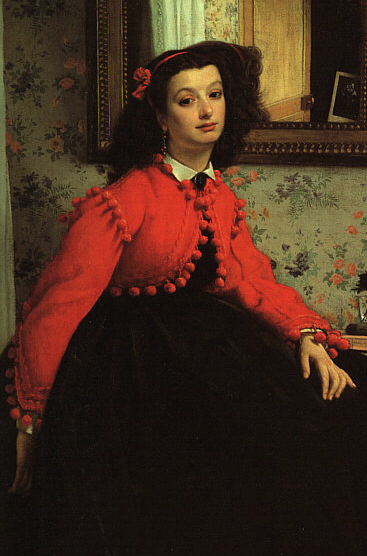
8 – 1864

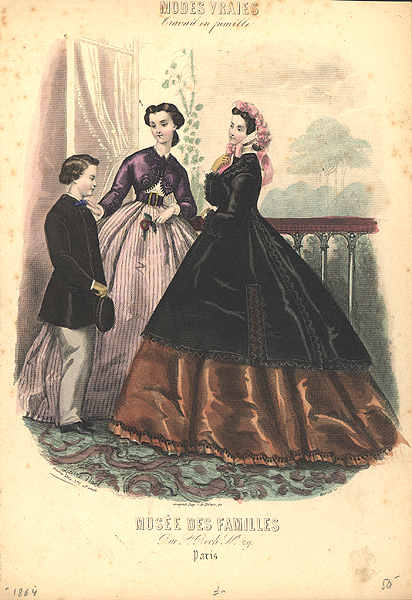
9 – 1864
1. Gowns from around 1860 with full skirts held out by crinolines
2. Gowns from the early 1860s.
3. Italian woman wears a gray striped jacket with turned-back pagoda sleeves trimmed in contrasting fabric and a matching skirt. Her blouse sleeves or engageantes are full over her lower arms, 1861.
4. 1862 portrait of Jenny Lind depicts her in a white gown with a wide lace collar. Her hair is parted in the center, rolled or "turned up" at the sides, and decorated with flowers.
5. Vienna fashion plate, showing male and female attire.
6. Carte de visite of Sarah Forbes Bonetta, in a dark silk dress.
7. Artistic dress has romantic, vaguely medieval lines with a slight train, and is worn without a corset or hoops. This young girl wears her hair down. 1862.
8. Zouave jacket in bright red with ball fringe and braid trim is waist length and cutaway in front, 1864.
9. Fashion plate of 1864 shows the fashionable braided Zouave-style cutaway jacket worn with a shirtwaist (blouse), skirt, and wide belt. The lady on the right wears a knee-length velvet coat.

=== Style gallery 1865–1866 ===
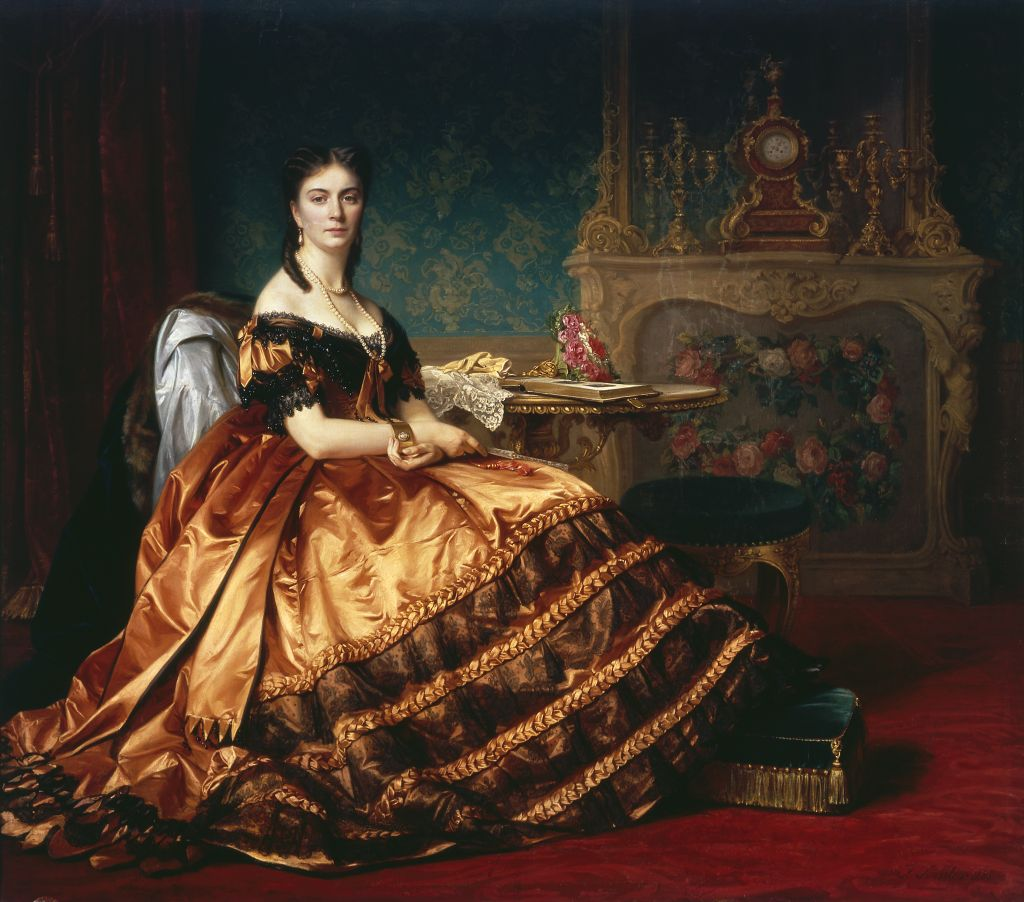
1 – 1865

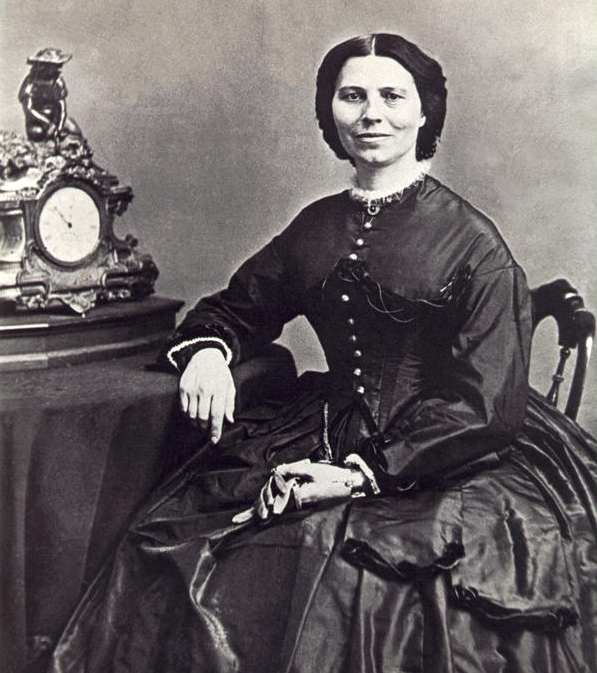
2 – 1865

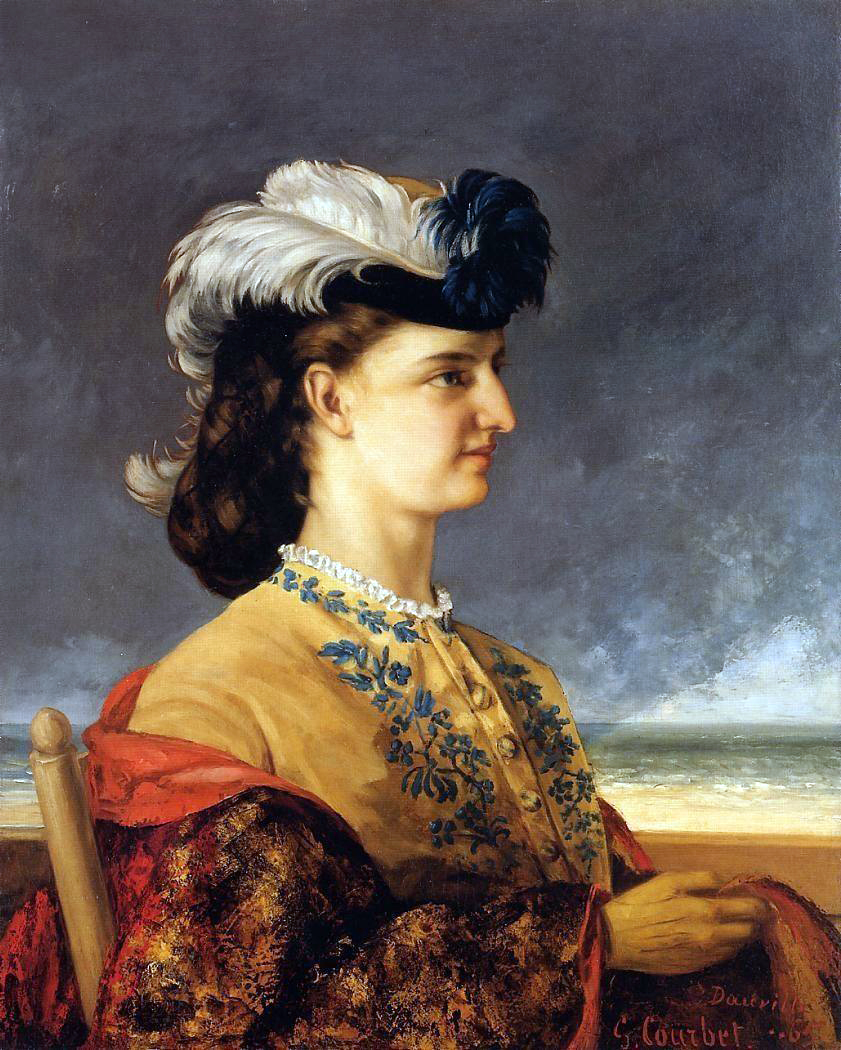
3 – 1865

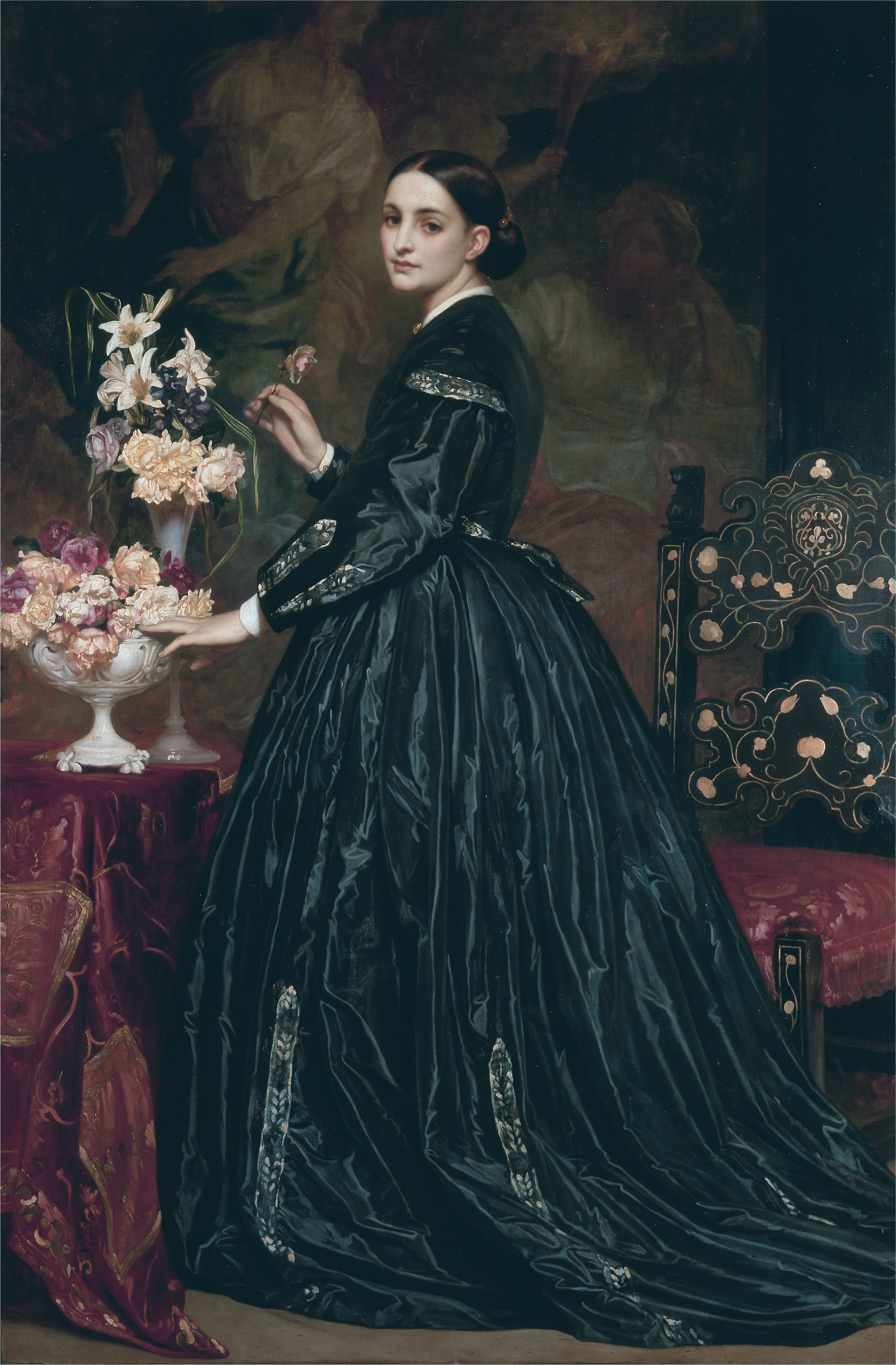
4 – 1865

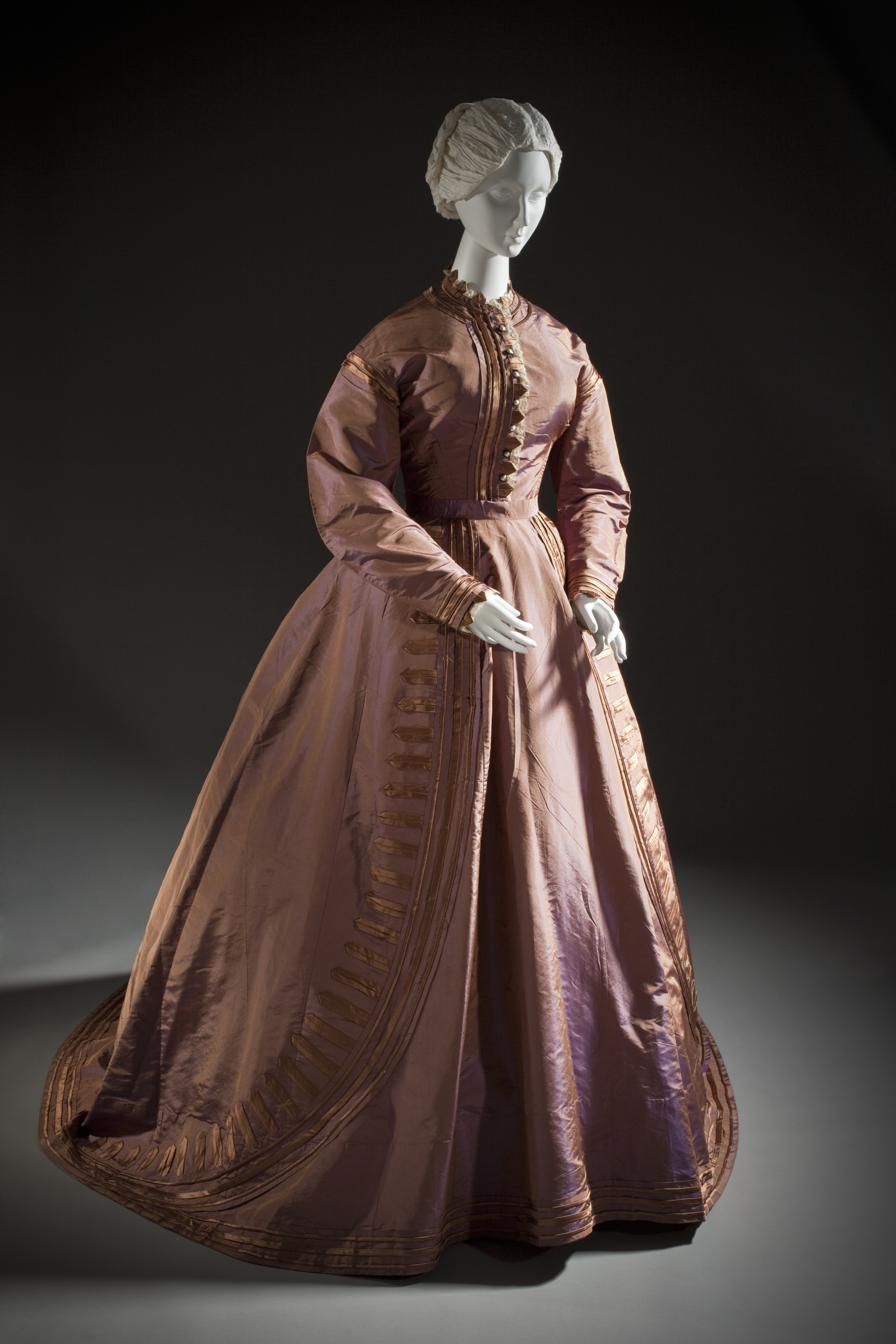
5 – c. 1865

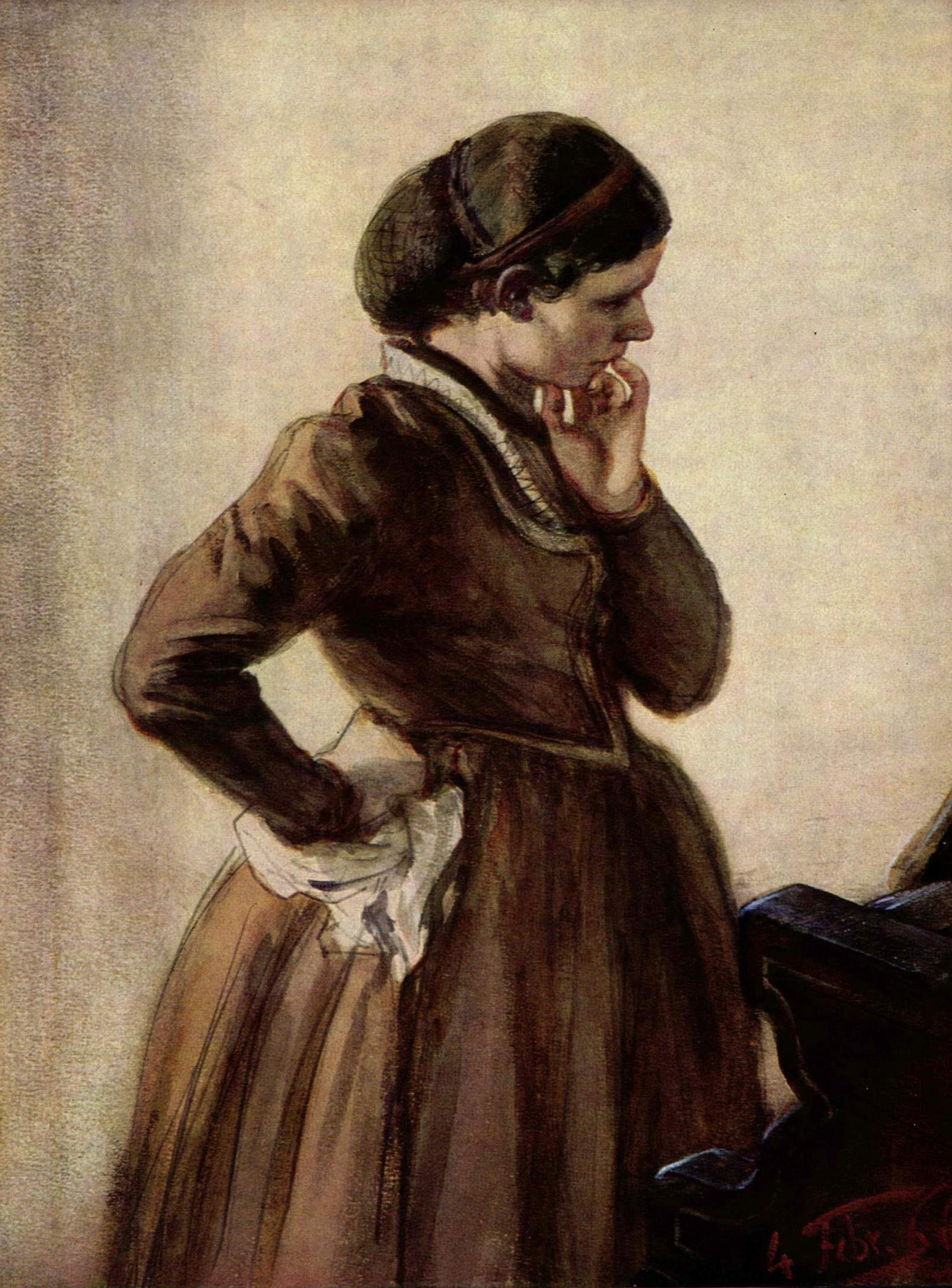
6 – 1866
1. Emilia Włodkowska wears a bronze-colored satin gown with bands of trim on the skirt, 1865.
2. Clara Barton wears a typical American hairstyle of 1865–66.
3. Countess Karoly wears her hair in a net or snood. Her hat is tipped forward over her forehead, and is trimmed with ostrich plumes, 1865.
4. Ellinor Guthrie wears a black satin dress trimmed with passementerie, 1865.
5. English shot (changeable) silk taffeta morning dress is trimmed with silk satin and machine-made lace, c. 1865. Los Angeles County Museum of Art, M.2007.211.942a-b.
6. Emilie Menzel wears her hair in a net snood. Her morning dress has a pointed waist and slightly puffed, long sleeves, 1866.

=== Style gallery 1867–1869 ===
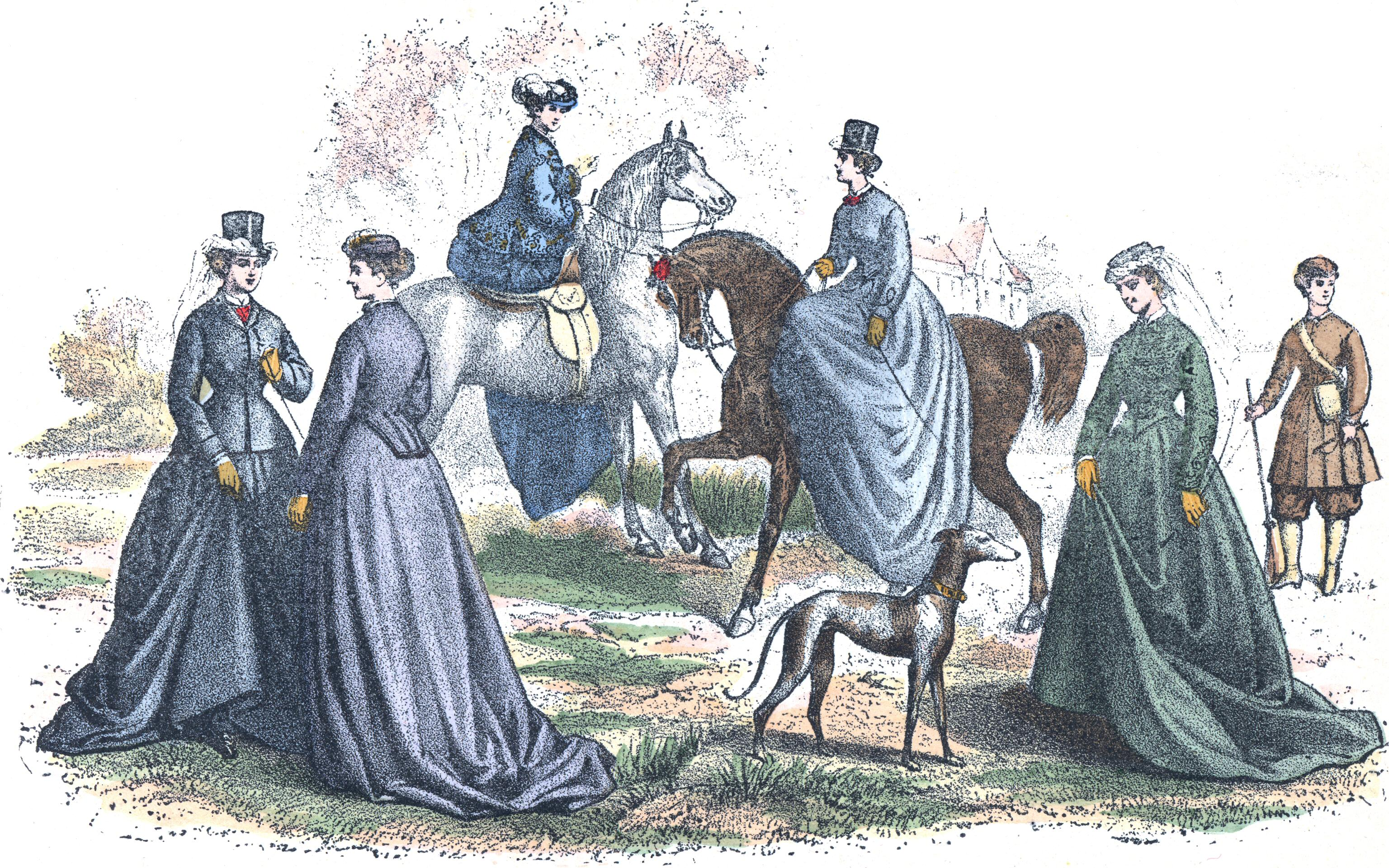
1 – 1867

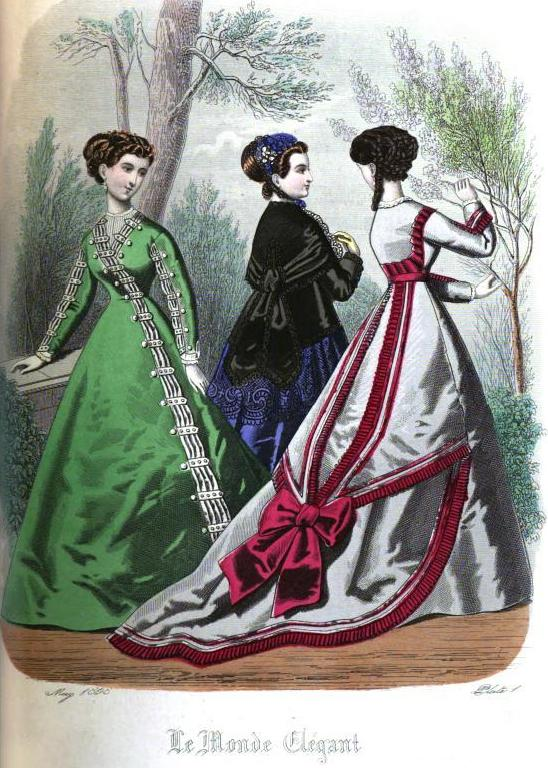
2 – May 1868

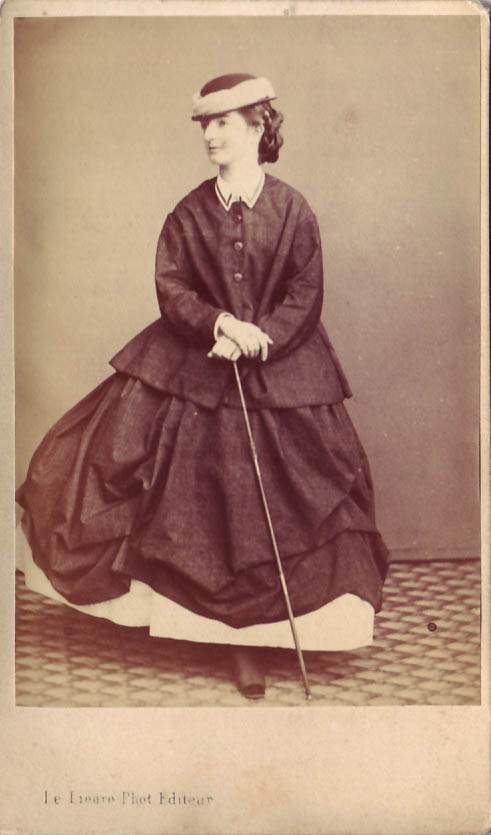
3 – Late 1860s

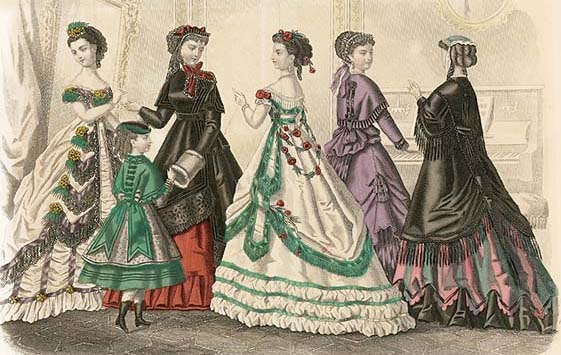
4 – 1869

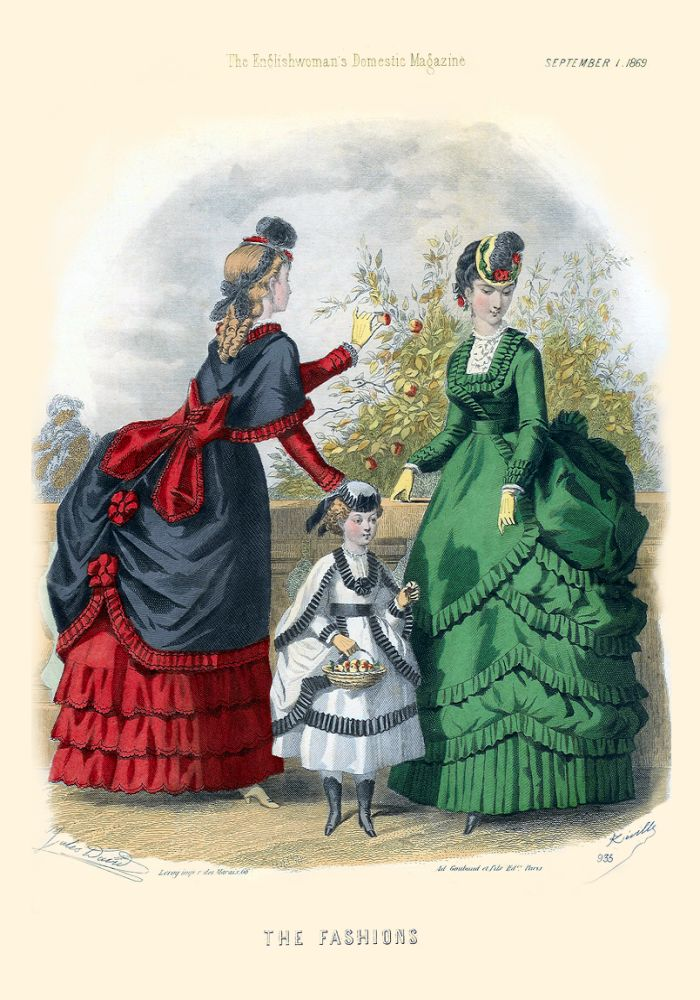
5 – 1869
1. Riding habits of 1867 feature short to hip-length jackets and trailing petticoats for riding sidesaddle.
2. Fashions of May 1868. Paris designs for May 1868. Relatively understated but showing developing back detail.
3. Margherita of Savoy-Genoa wears an outdoor walking costume consisting of a loose jacket and matching skirt. The skirt is drawn up for ease of walking over an ankle-length underskirt or petticoat and hoops. She wears a bowler-like hat wrapped in a scarf or veil. Latter half 1860s.
4. Fashions of 1869 show a high waist and an elliptical skirt. Draped styles suggest a separate underskirt or petticoat. Jackets are knee-length.
5. Fashions from The Englishwoman's Domestic Magazine, 1869, show the beginnings of the bustle: high-waisted skirts are looped up over underskirts. Hats are worn tipped forward over the forehead, and short gloves are worn with long, tight sleeves.

=== Caricature gallery ===
The crinoline style gave wide scope to satirists, and many cartoons and comic odes to the crinoline appeared.

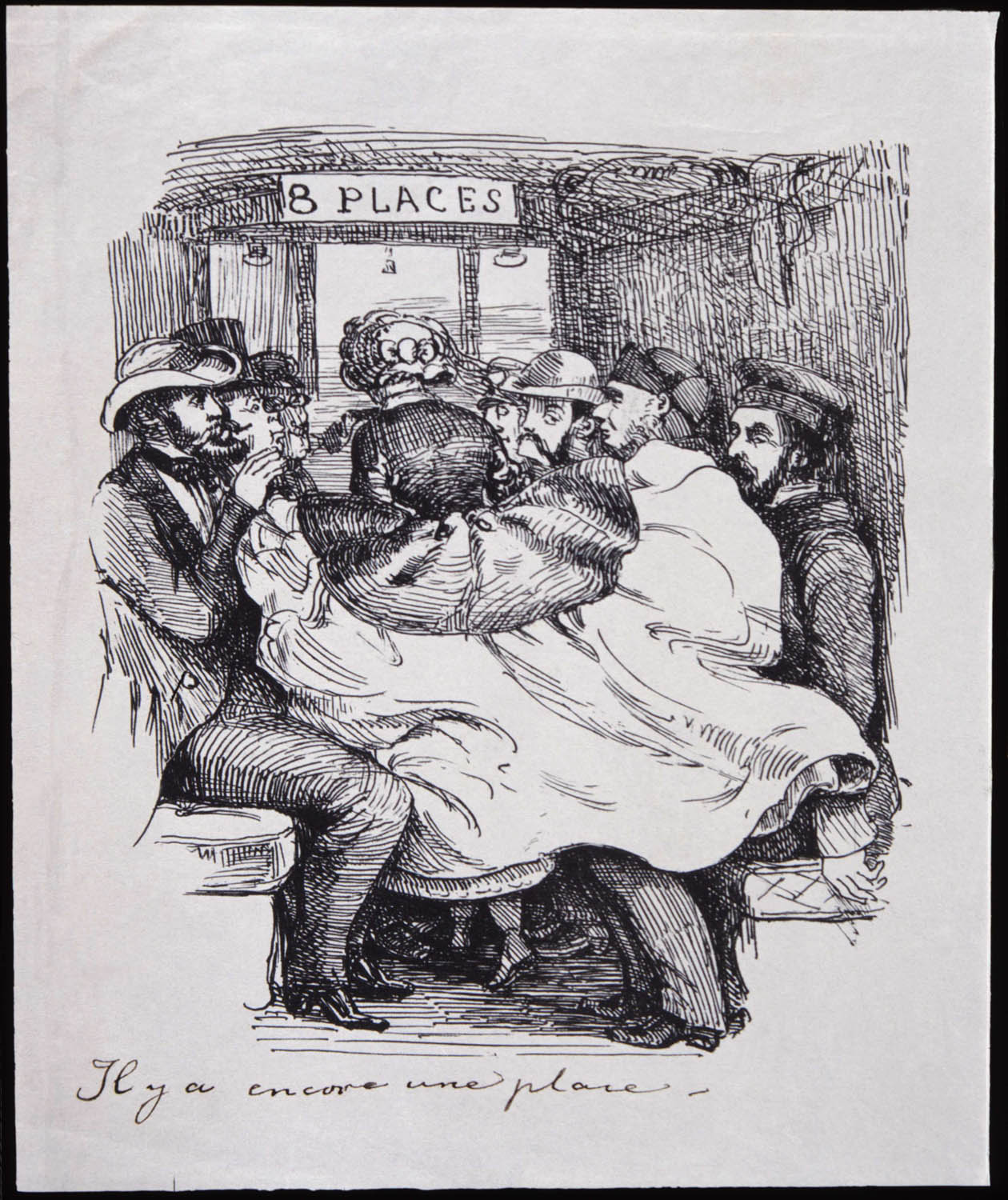
1 – c. 1860

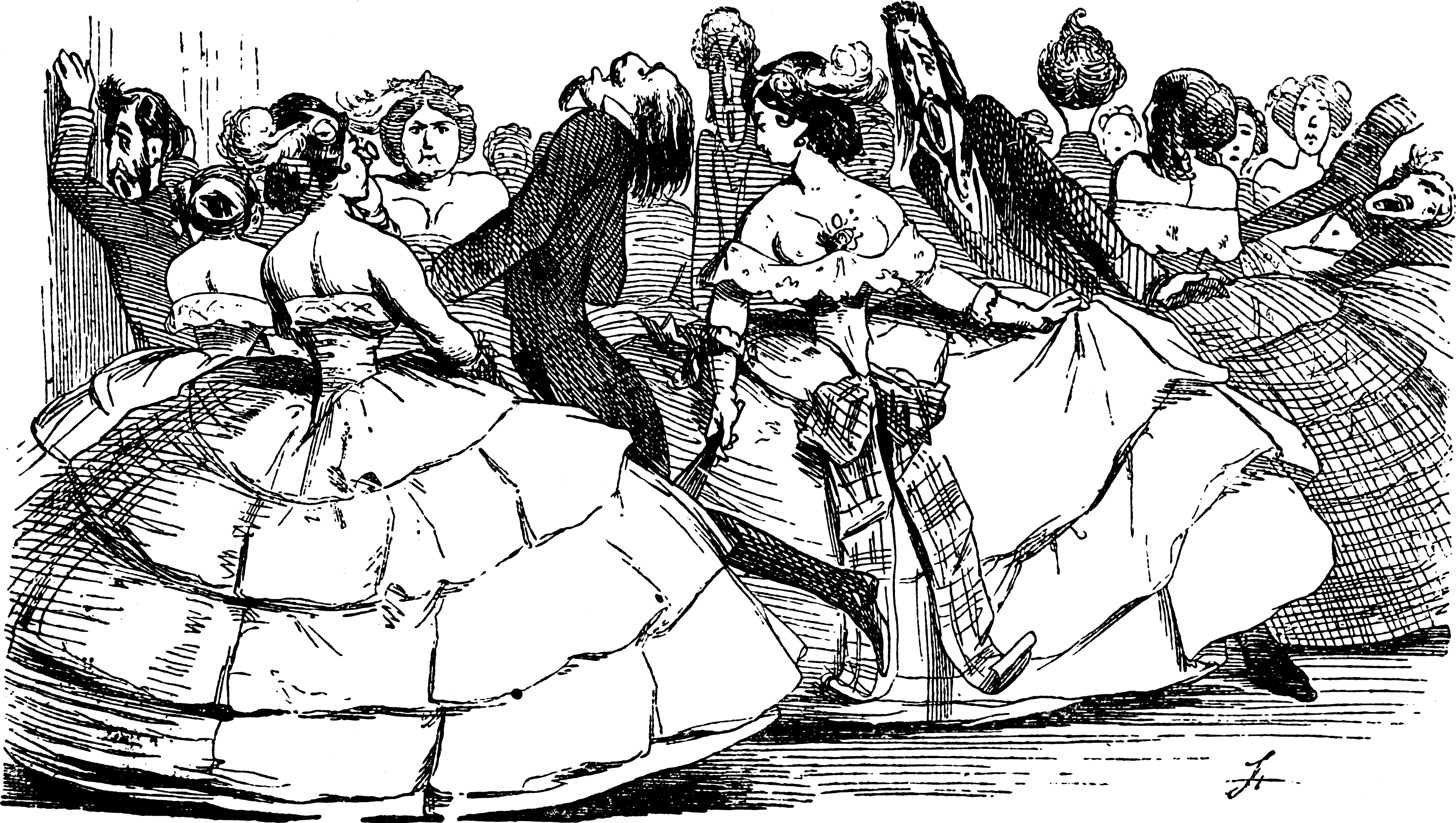
2 – c. 1860

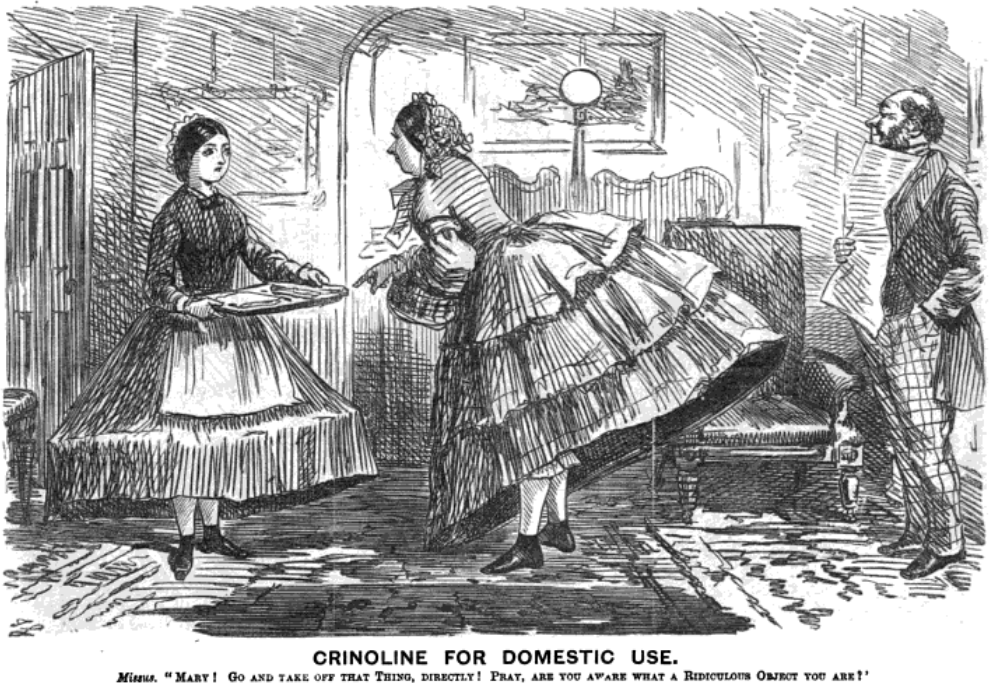
3 – 1862
1. Il y a encore une place, satire on traveling in a train compartment, c. 1860.
2. 1860, Caricature of men being "squeezed" by women's expansive crinolines, c. 1860.
3. 1862, A fashionably dressed woman tells off her maid for wearing a crinoline hoop, unaware that she looks just as ridiculous in hers, 1862.

== Men's fashion ==
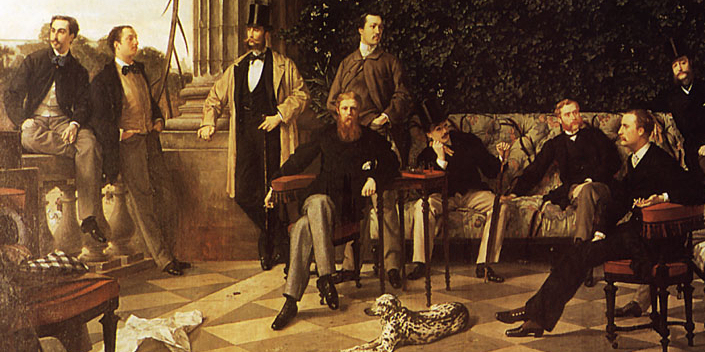
Parisian composers: The Circle of the Rue Royale, 1868

Men's fashion saw continuous changes from the previous decade.

Shirts of linen or cotton featured high upstanding or turnover collars, and neckties grew wider and were tied in a bow or looped into a loose knot and fastened with a stickpin. Heavy padded and fitted frock coats (in French redingotes), now usually single-breasted and knee length, were worn for business occasions, over waistcoats or vests with lapels and notched collars. Waistcoats were generally cut straight across the front and had lapels.

Notably the familiar 'four-in-hand' tie ubiquitous in the modern three-piece suit emerged as a popular style in this decade. Detachable collars, invented in 1827, were widely the norm for men.

The loosely fitted, mid-thigh length sack coat continued to slowly displace the frock coat for less-formal business occasions, and was often sported for holidays and informal day-to-day events. The decade is recognized for the emergence of the popularity of the modern suit formed by a sack coat with matching trousers and waistcoats, though the sack coat previously dated to the 1840s.

The slightly cutaway morning coat was still worn for formal day occasions. The most formal evening dress remained a dark tail coat and trousers, with a white cravat; this costume was well on its way to crystallizing into the modern "white tie and tails." While during the first half of the decade the waist was long, after 1865 the waist became shorter, with pockets in the pleats.

Full-length trousers were worn, generally of a contrasting fabric. Costumes consisting of a coat, waistcoat and trousers of the same fabric (called a "ditto suit") remained a novelty at this time. In domestic settings, the sack coat or a lounge jacket could be worn with a waistcoat and trousers of the same fabric. This form of ditto suit, referred to as a lounge suit in the United Kingdom was generally made of wool, with baggy tailoring. However, the lounge suit was not considered appropriate for public settings until the 1870s.

Overcoats had wide lapels and deep cuffs, and often featured contrasting velvet collars.

Top hats briefly became the very tall "stovepipe" shape, but a variety of other hat shapes were popular. During this time, the bowler hat gained popularity as an informal hat. This new type of hat was normally made of felt, black for most of the year or brown for the summer months.

In 1865 hatmaker John B. Stetson invented the Boss of the Plains hat. It gained immediate success in the Old West among cowboys and settlers, due to its practicality. It had a vaguely round ribbon-lined crown and a wide brim, originally straight but soon becoming stylized into the iconic rim of the typical cowboy hat. Its dense felt could be rugged enough to carry water.

=== Style gallery ===
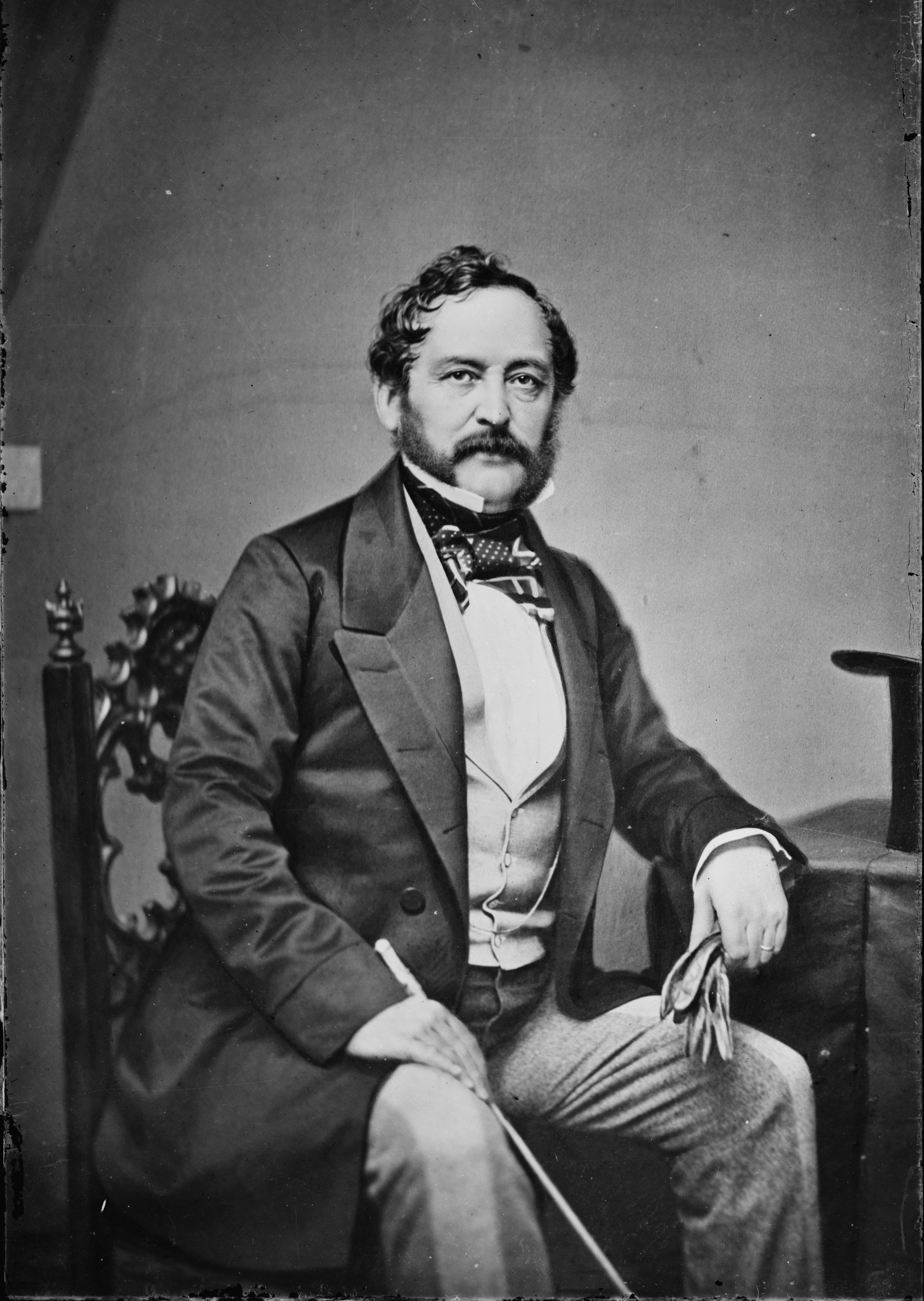
1 – 1855–1865

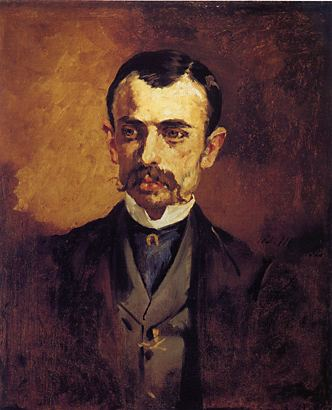
2 – 1860

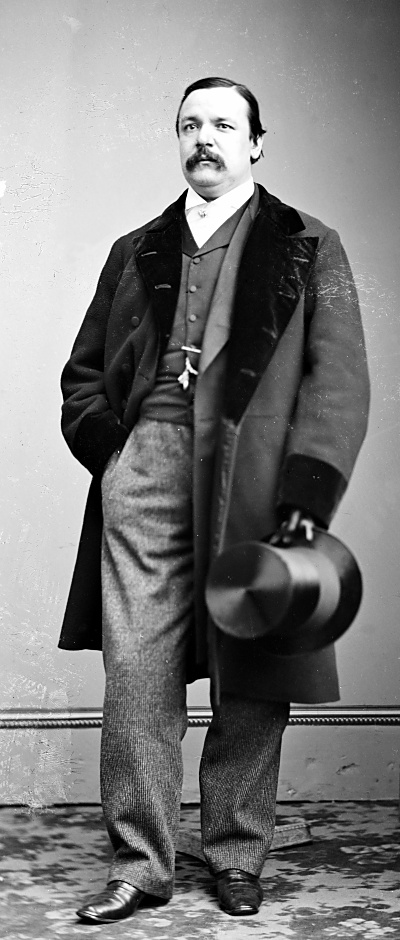
3 – 1860–1865

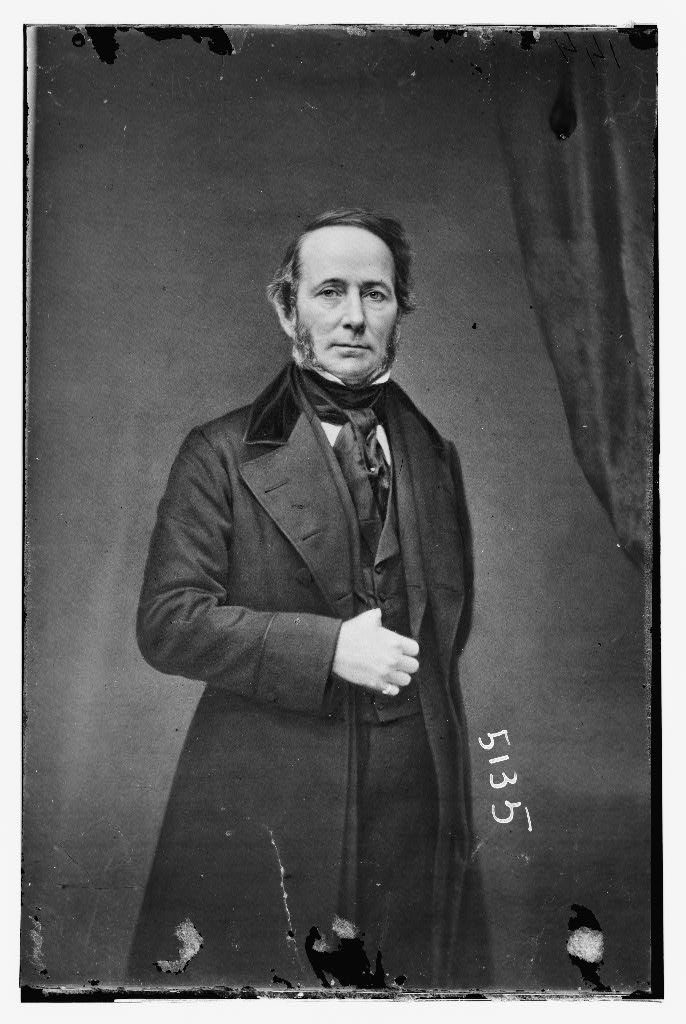
4 – 1855–1865

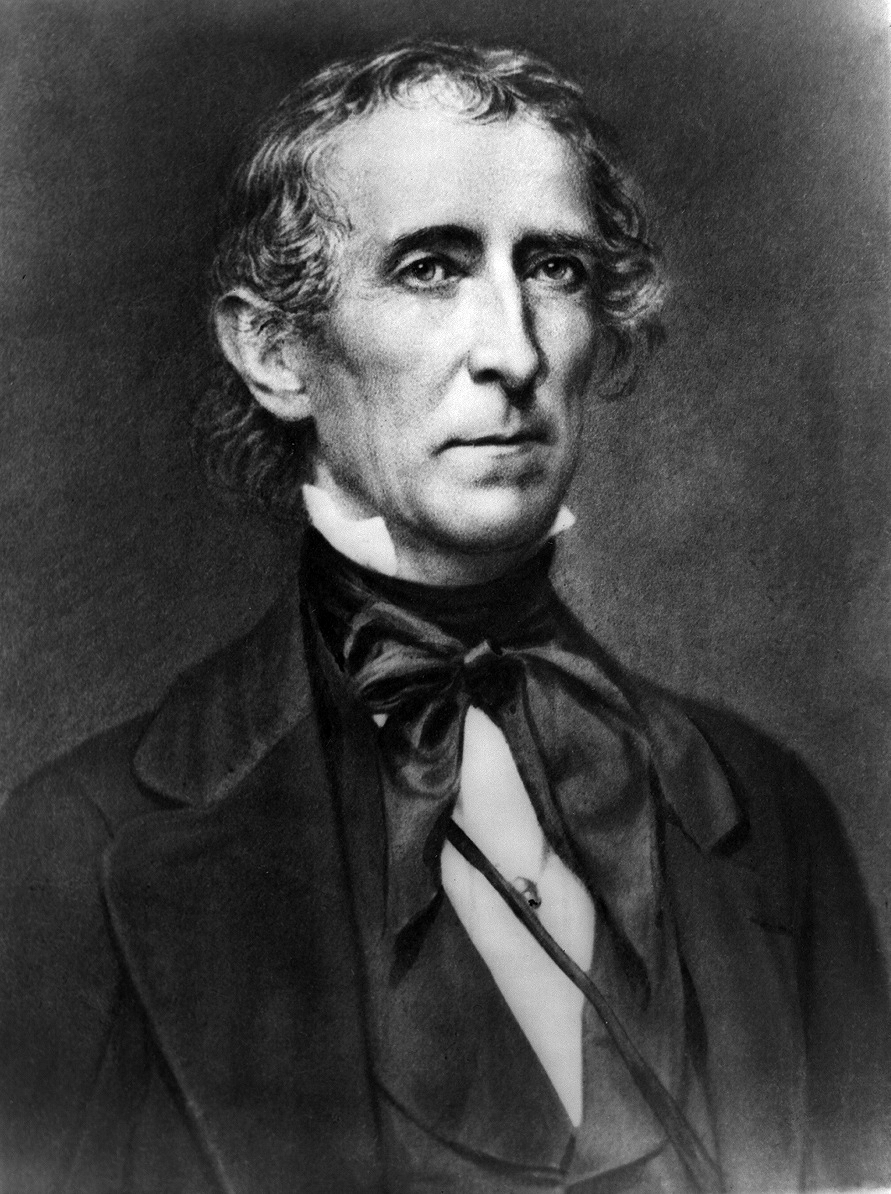
5 – 1860–1862

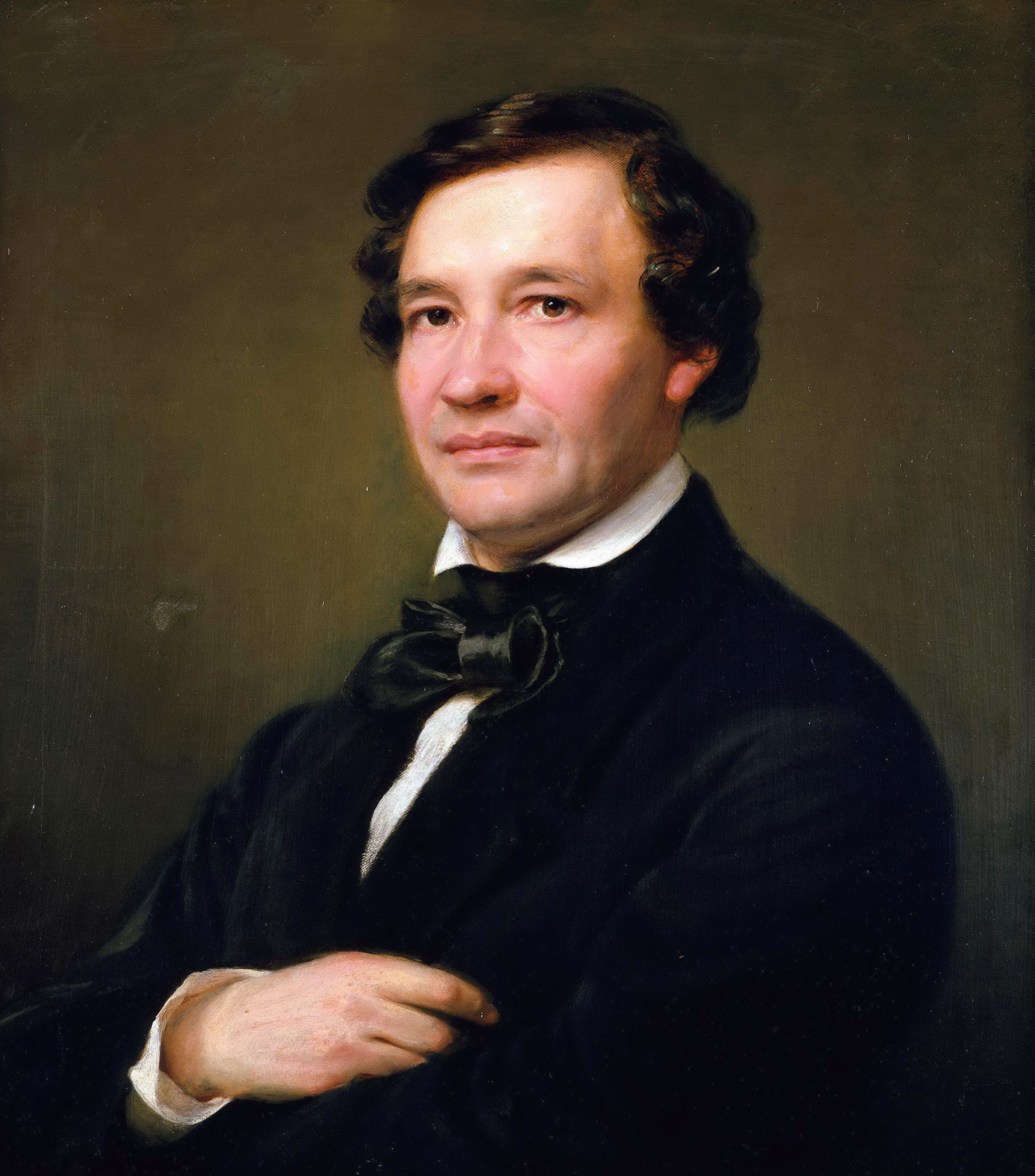
6 – 1862

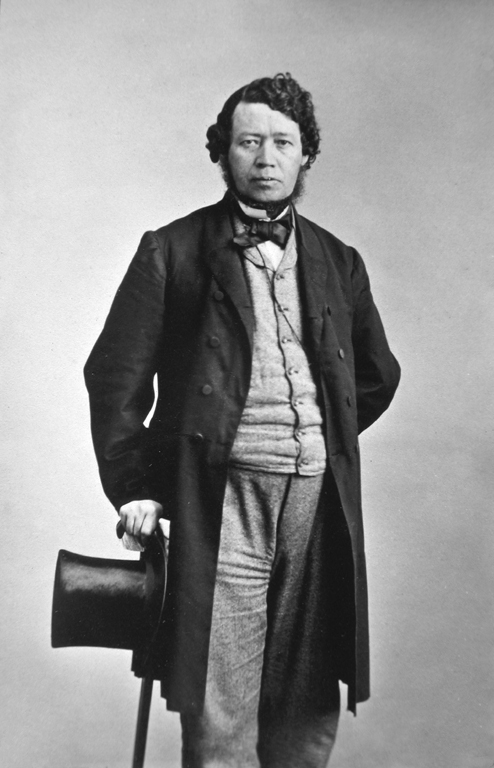
7 – 1868

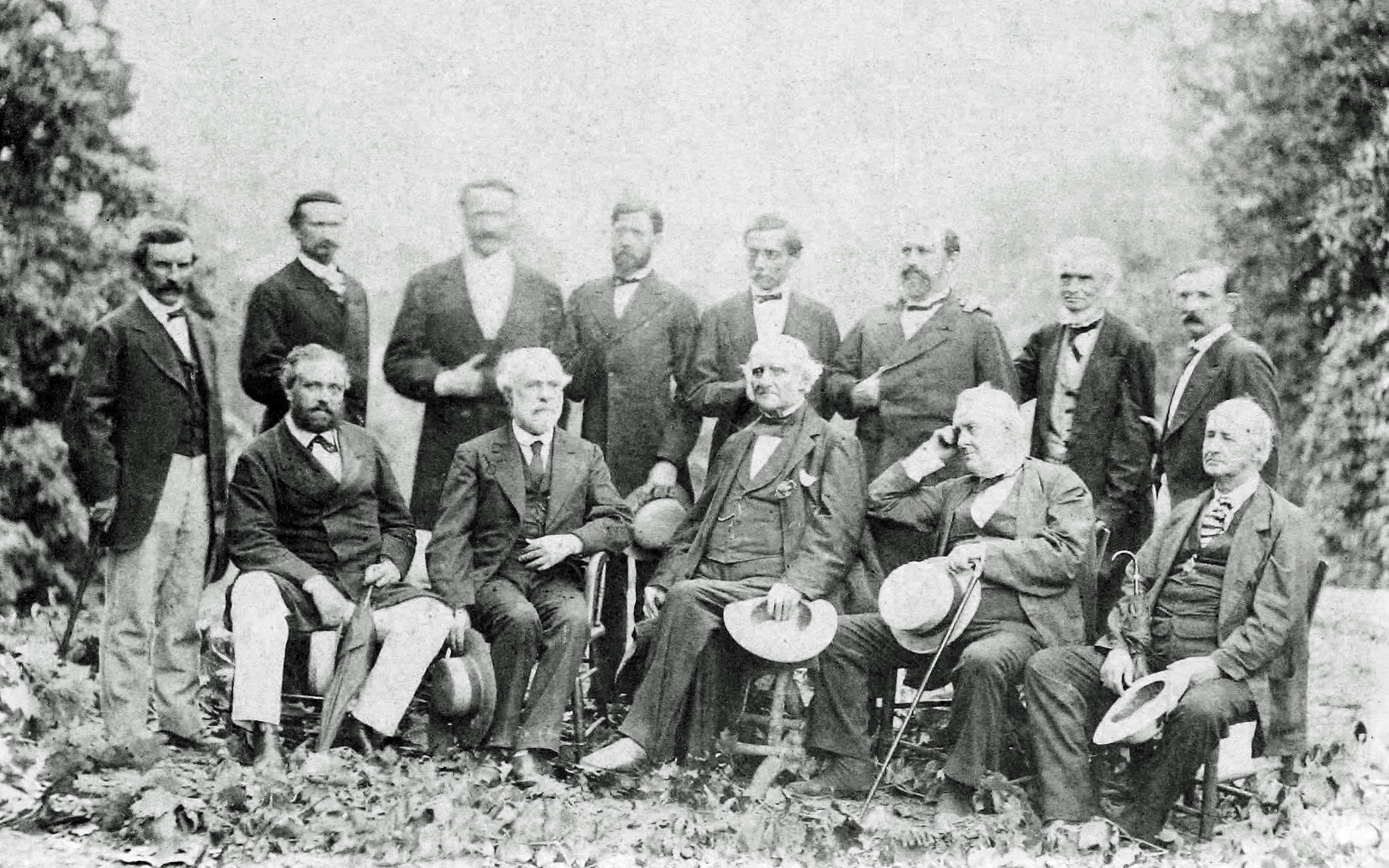
9 – 1869
1. Eduard de Stoeckl wears a frock coat over a waistcoat with a low front and lapels. He wears a patterned tie. 1855–1865.
2. Manet's unidentified man wears a tie secured with a jewel at the neck, a shawl-collared waistcoat, and a contrasting coat, 1860.
3. George Augustus Sala wears an overcoat with black velvet collar, wide lapels, and deep cuffs over a frock coat, waistcoat, and tweed trousers. He wears leather gloves and carries a top hat. c. 1860–1865.
4. William Curtis Noyes wears an overcoat with very wide lapels, wide cuffs, a contrasting (probably velvet) collar, and braid trim over a frock coat, waistcoat, and trousers which appear to be made of matching fabric. The ends of his large necktie are loosely looped and secured with a stickpin, and then tucked into his waistcoat. 1855–1865.
5. John Tyler wears a cravat tied in a floppy bow. His coat has wide lapels and contrasting waistcoat have wide lapels, 1860–1862.
6. Wilhelm Taubert wears a dark necktie tied in a bow and slightly winged collar. German, 1862.
7. Thomas D'Arcy McGee wears a dark double-breasted frock coat over a high-buttoned single-breasted waistcoat and trousers., 1868.
8. Robert E. Lee (center) wears a jacket with matching trousers and waistcoat. He wears a four-in-hand knot black necktie and holds a boss-of-the-plains style straw hat in his hand. August 1869.

Note: Photographs from the Library of Congress's Brady-Handy collection are collectively dated 1855–1865. Where possible, tighter dates have been applied based on known facts about the sitters. See Mathew Brady.

== Children's fashion ==
Both boys and girls wore skirts from the time they could walk until they reached age 5 or 6. Very small girls wore their skirts just below knee-length over pantalettes. Skirts became very gradually longer as girls grew up until they reached ankle length at coming-out (in their later teens, usually 16–18). Older girls wore hoops to hold out their skirts. Young girls wore washable pinafores over their dresses for work and play to keep them clean, as typified by the eponymous heroine of Lewis Carroll's 1865 novel, and her Alice in Wonderland dress.

Boys wore simple jackets and trousers.

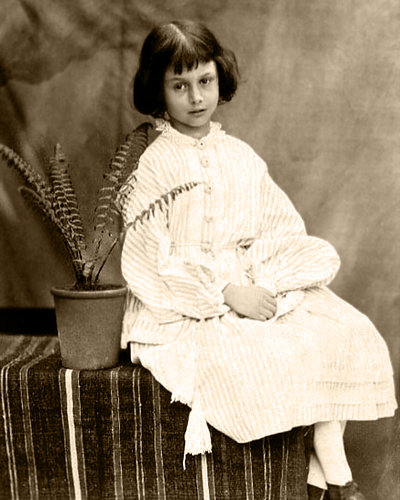
Alice Liddell, 1860

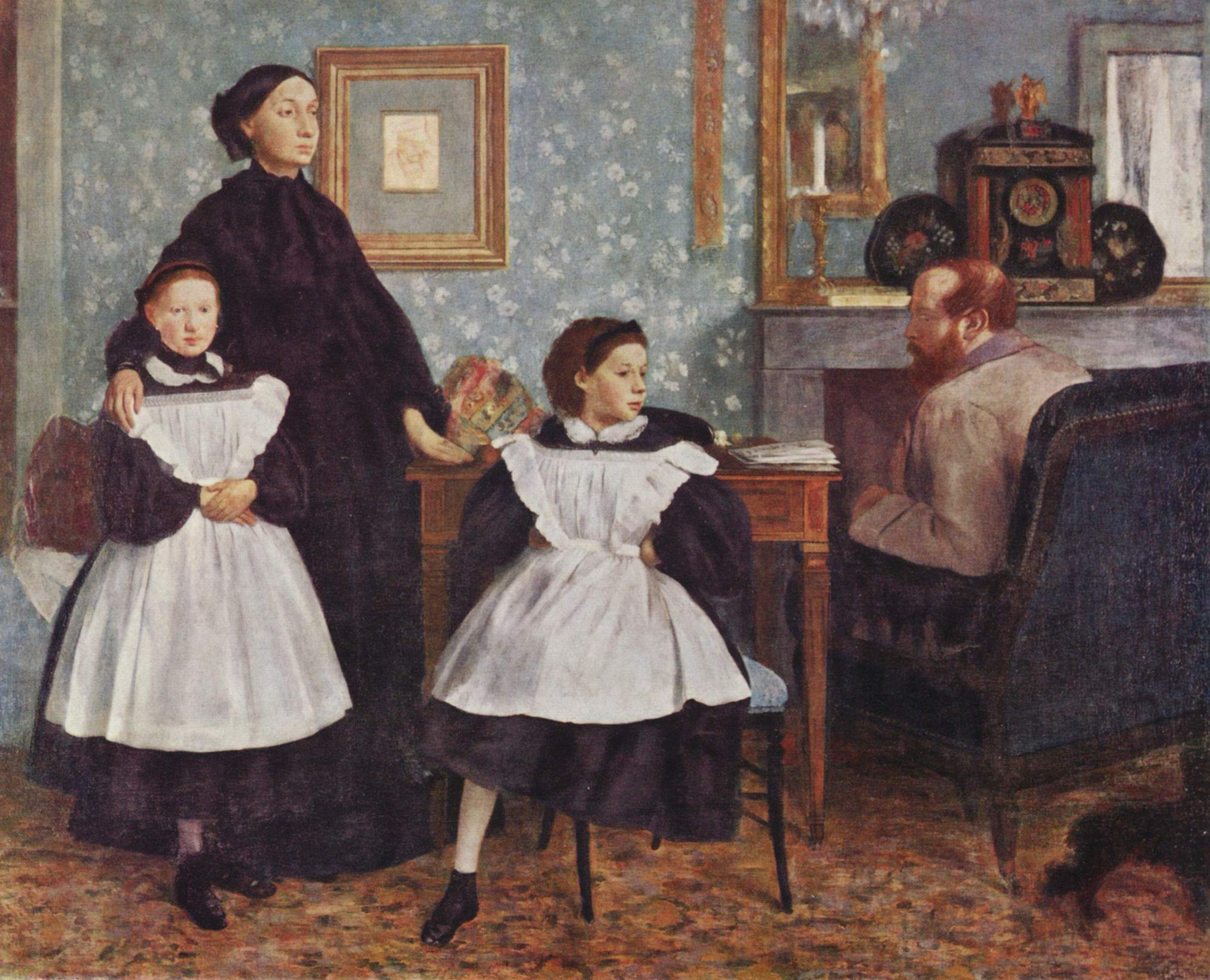
Girls in pinafores, 1860–1862

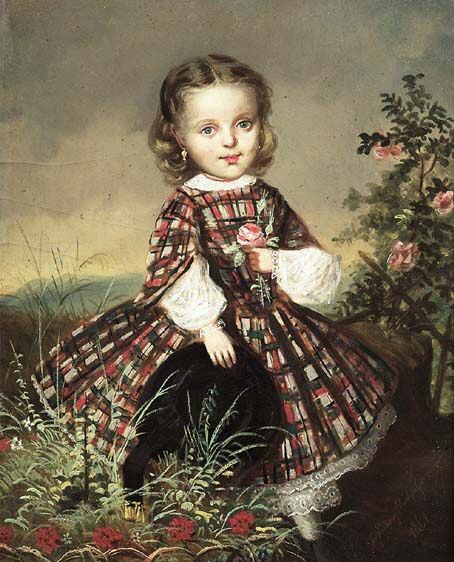
Germany, 1861

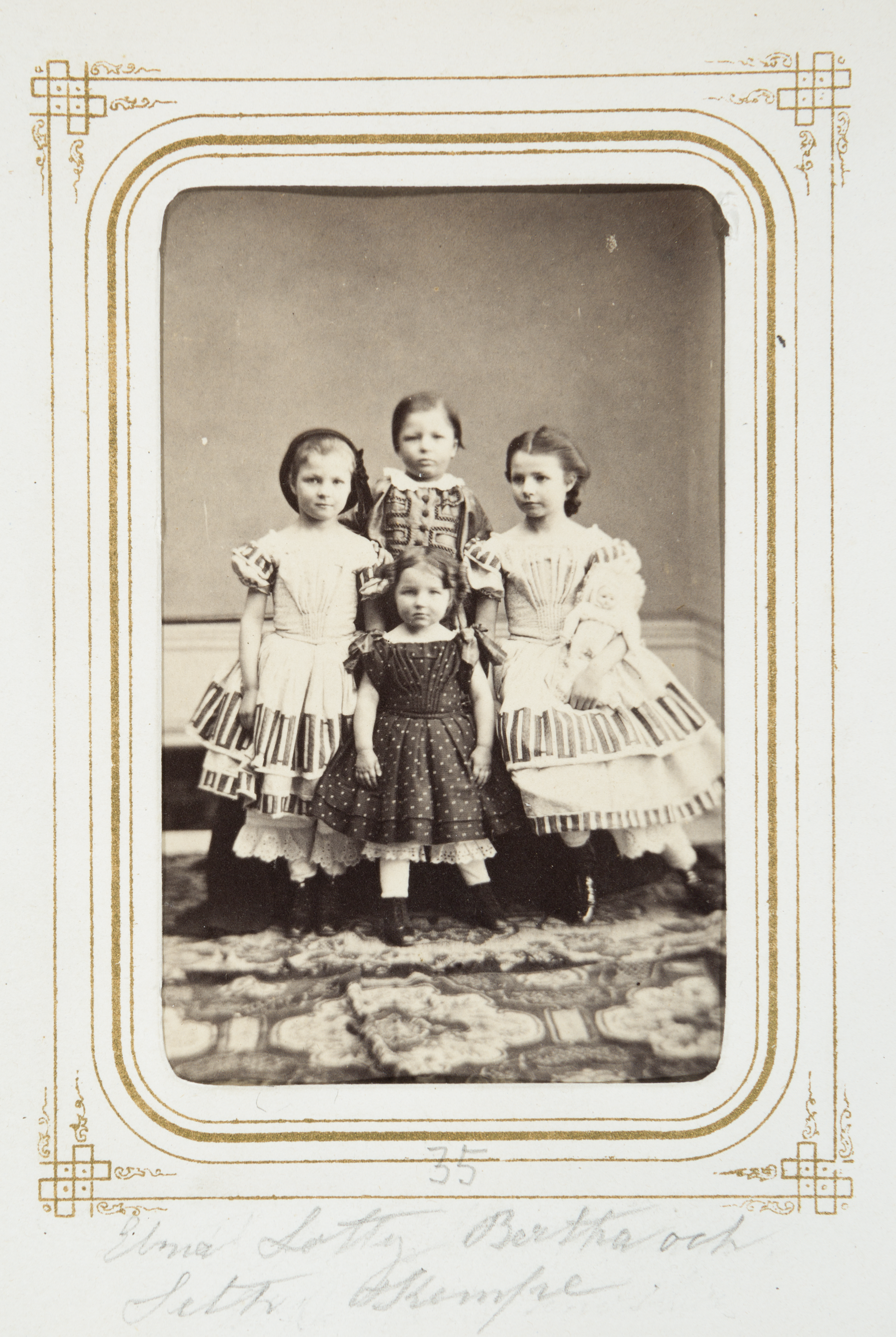
Sweden, 1860s

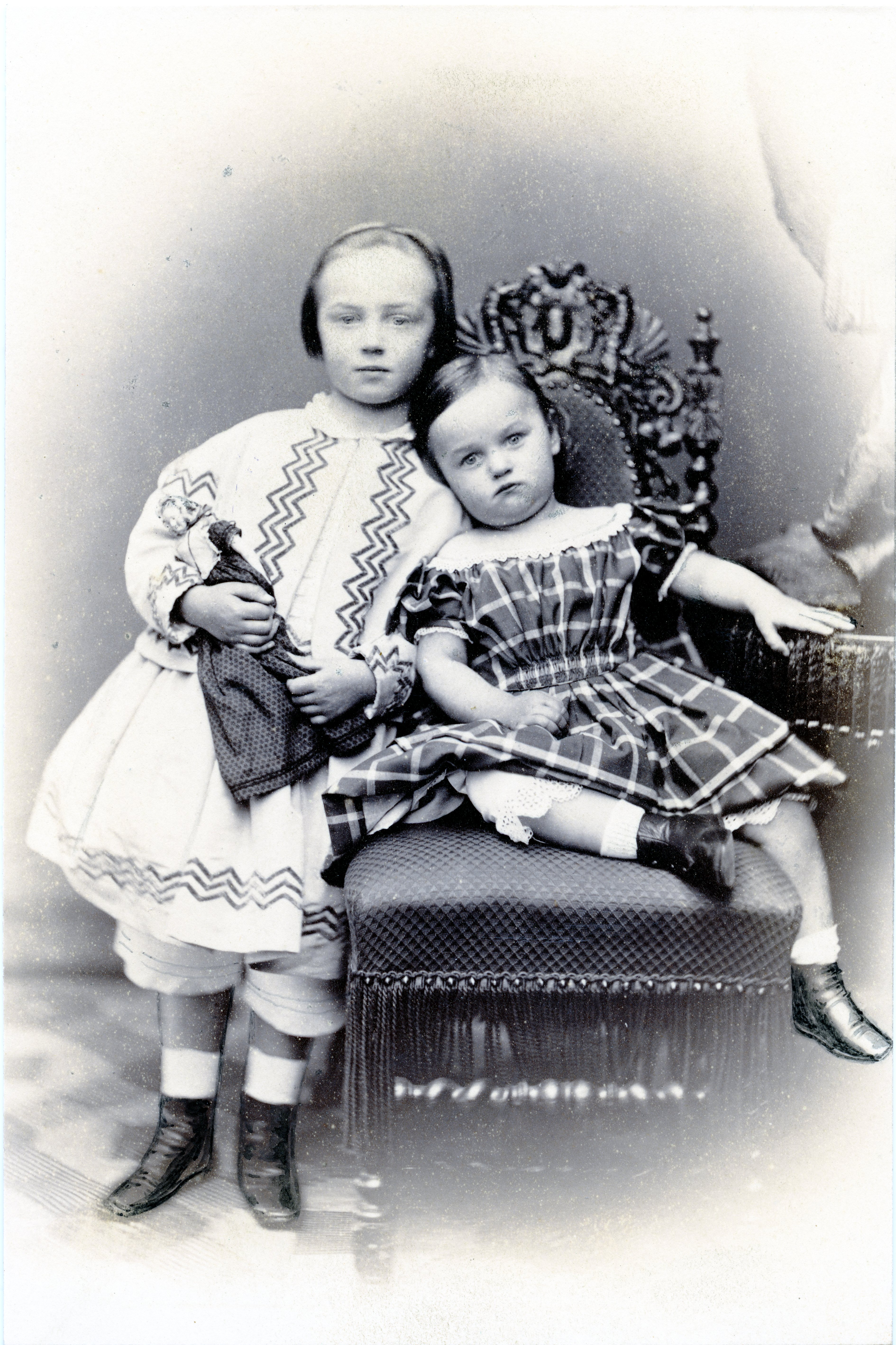
German girls, 1866

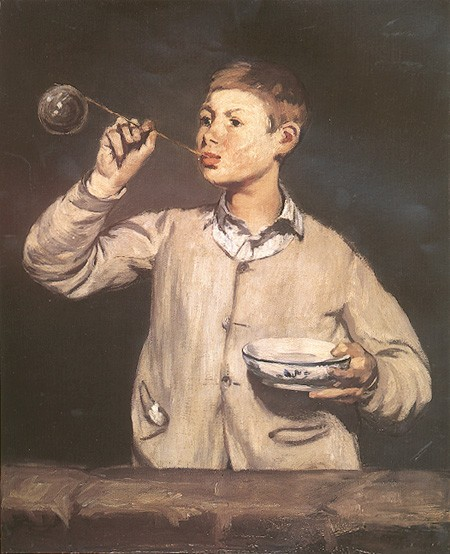
Boy, 1867

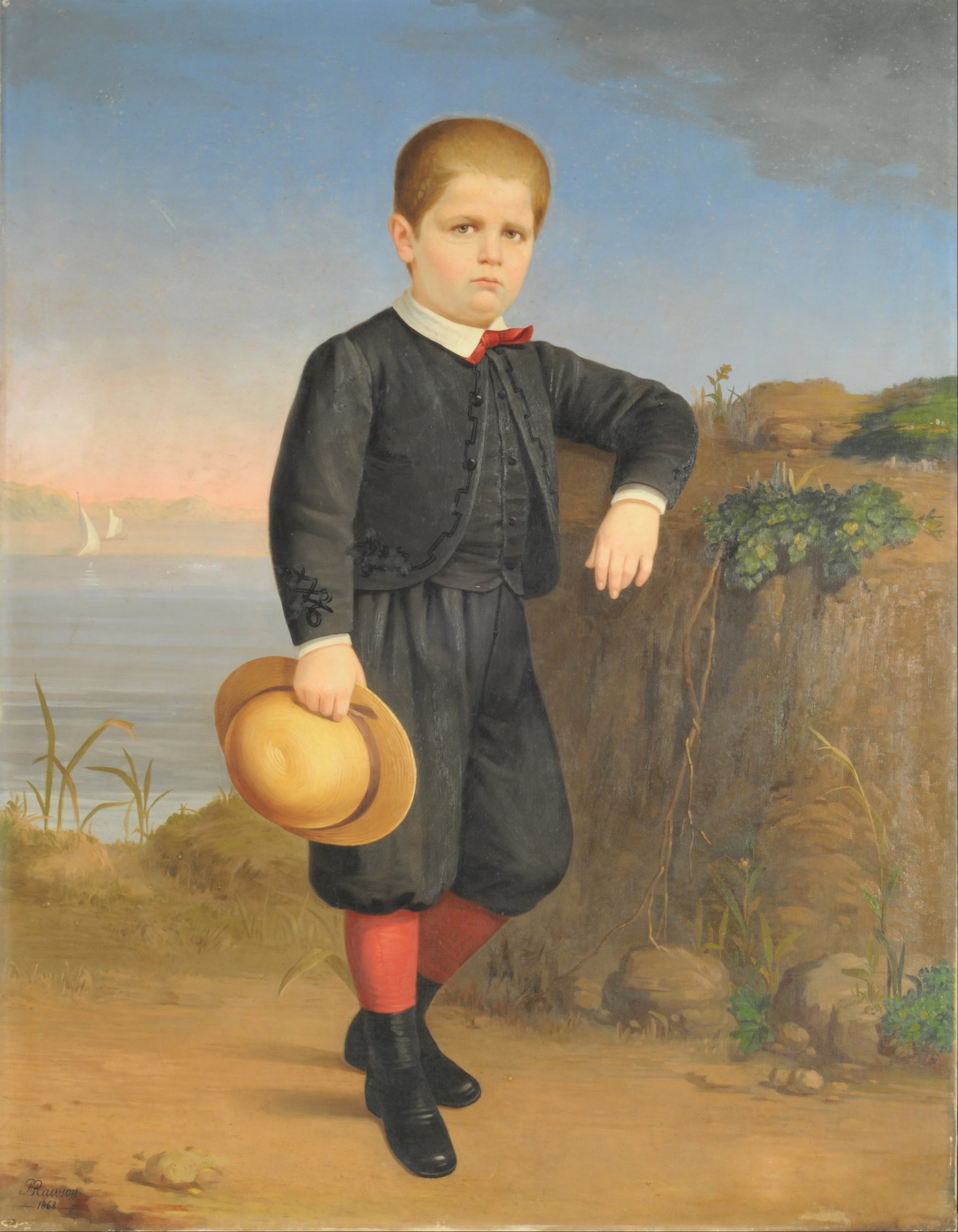
Boy, 1868

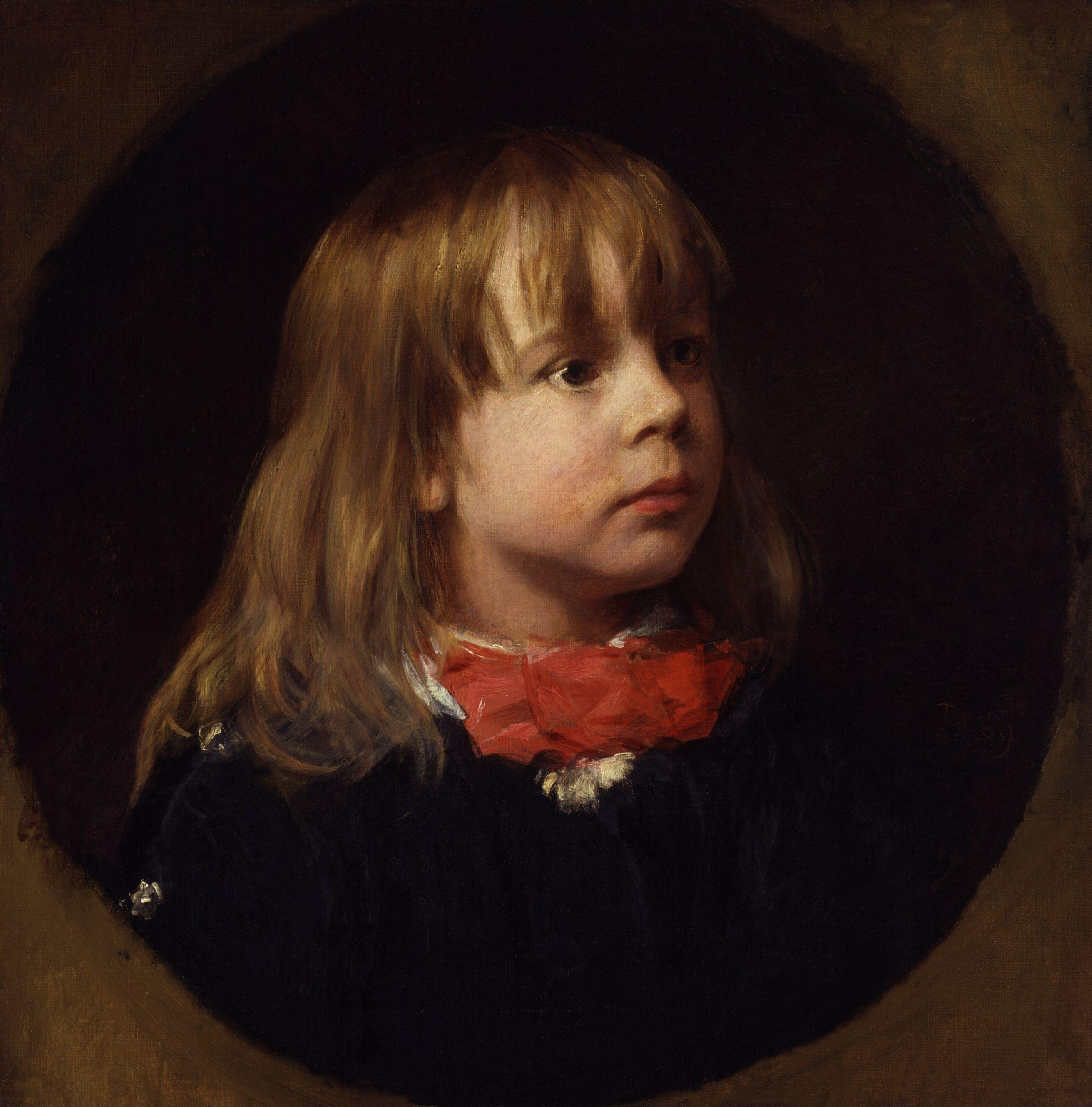
English boy, 1869

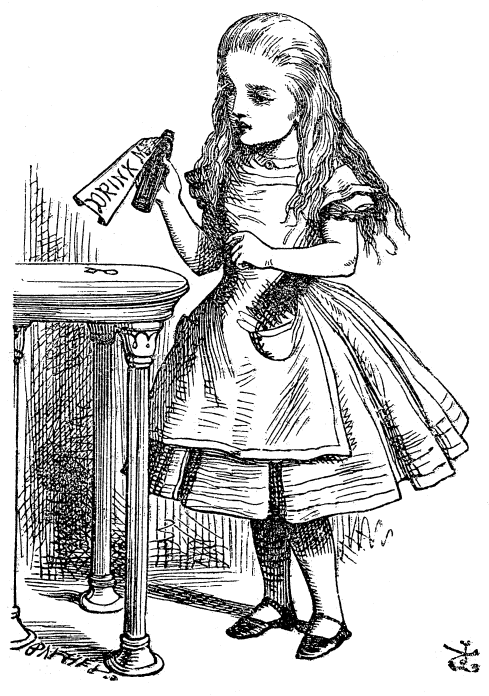
A girl's dress with a pinafore, 1865

== See also ==
- Victorian fashion
- Artistic Dress movement
- Crinoline
- Corset controversy
