= Alice in Wonderland dress =

Iconic dress in Alice's Adventures in Wonderland

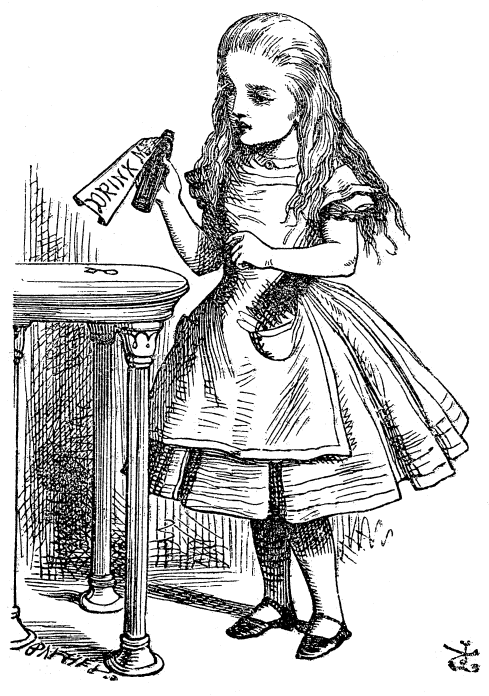
Alice as she appears in John Tenniel's illustrations for Alice's Adventures in Wonderland.

Alice, featured in Lewis Carroll's 1865 novel Alice's Adventures in Wonderland, is one of the most iconic figures to emerge from 19th century children's literature and one who is instantly recognized by her attire. Although many artists have depicted Alice in many different ways, the original illustrations by John Tenniel have become iconic through their subsequent repetition (with generally minimal alterations) in most published editions and film adaptations.

The headband depicted by Tenniel became so linked to Alice that it gave rise to the term "Alice band".

== Tenniel's Alice ==
Tenniel's black-and-white illustrations for Alice's Adventures in Wonderland depict Alice wearing a knee-length puffed sleeve dress with a pinafore worn over the top and ankle-strap shoes.

In the analysis of Masafumi Monden,

Alice's sense of agency is further conveyed by her dress... Little girls' dresses in mid- to late nineteenth-century Europe were, even with certain restrictions, slightly more practical than adults', and the dress Alice wore in Tenniel's illustrations was a fashion current to the time of the book with a faint hint of the practical future ... Both the character and dress of Alice thus point out that she is neither assertive nor passive but is rather positioned comfortably in between the two.

Lewis Carroll gave directions to Tenniel over some aspects of the dress. Tenniel's first design was intended to give Alice the look of a chess piece. However, Caroll instructed Tenniel not to give it "so much crinoline", a common component of women's dresses at the time. Tenniel also changed the dress from book to book. In Through the Looking Glass, he gave Alice striped horizontal stockings and her (now eponymous) headband. For The Nursery "Alice", he re-drew twenty of the illustrations, and brought Alice into line with contemporary fashion. He not only coloured the dress yellow (discussed in detail later) but added a second bow to Alice's hair, a bow to the apron, and pleats.

== The colour of Alice's dress ==
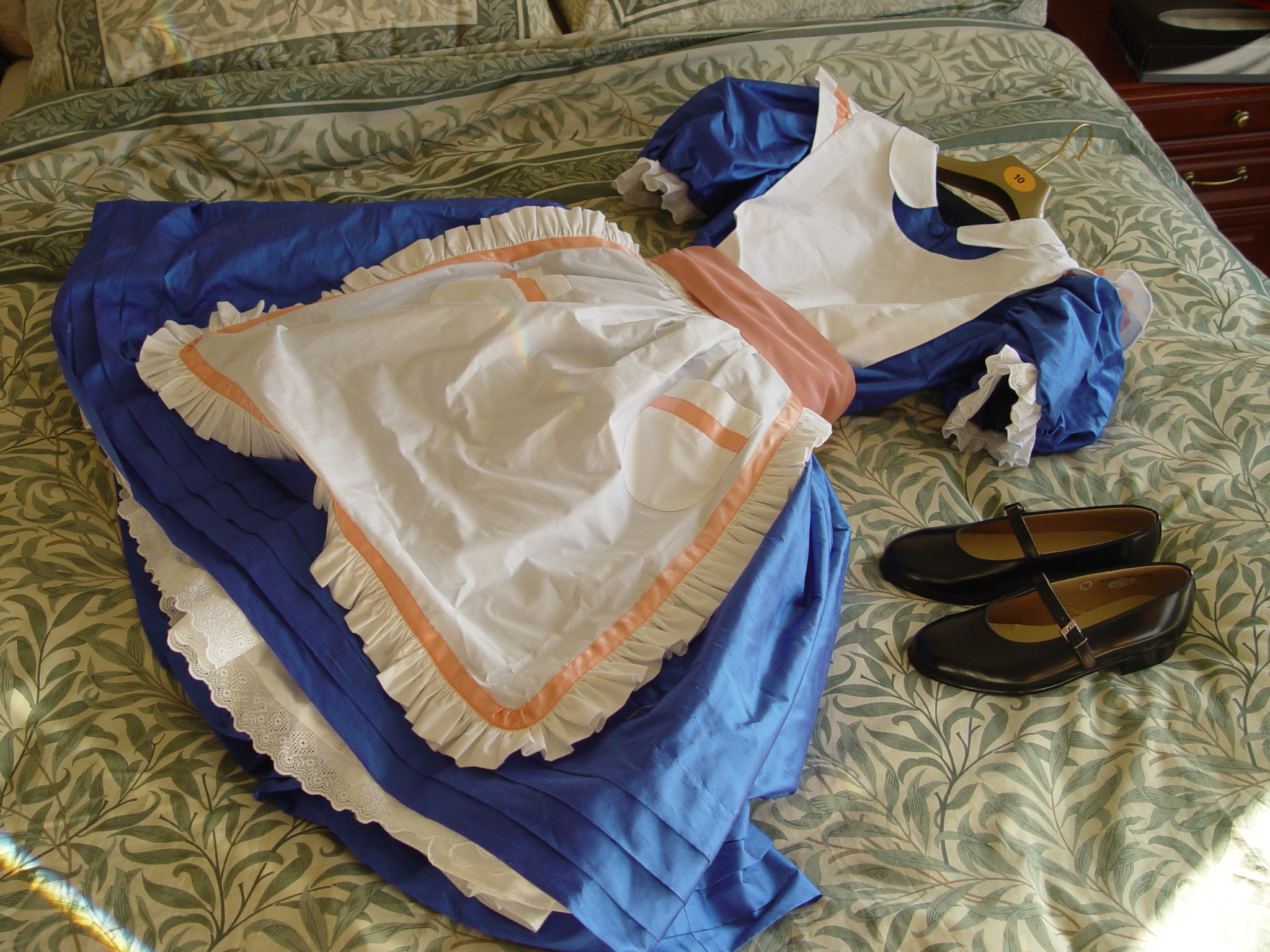
An Alice in Wonderland costume based on the design from the 1972 film Alice's Adventures in Wonderland. This is an example of the most well-known depiction of Alice's dress.

Neither the wording nor illustrations to Alice's Adventures in Wonderland indicated the colour of her clothes. In a popular stage version of the story, staged by Henry Savile Clarke in 1886–87, Alice's costume was white (a decision endorsed for the next production by Lewis Carroll).

The first colourised versions of Tenniel's images were created for The Nursery "Alice", coloured under his supervision. In this edition, Alice's dress was yellow.

Subsequent colourised versions of Tenniel's illustrations created for editions of the Alice books after Charles Dodgson's death and without the involvement of Tenniel have dressed Alice in different colours, including red, orange, and chartreuse. DeLoss McGraw's illustrations used a range of colours.

One of the earliest editions, Macmillan's 1903 "Little Folks" edition, had her in a blue dress. Macmillan's deluxe 1911 edition, which featured colour plates based on Tenniel's illustrations painted by artist Harry Theaker, again had Alice in a blue dress. Other illustrators also retained the blue colour scheme, including Helen Oxenbury.

The blue dress later became the most common and well-known version of Alice's dress, showing up often in print and filmed adaptations that take their inspiration from Tenniel's original illustrations (including Paramount's 1933 movie, Disney's 1951 movie, and the 1972 movie). Although some adaptations have chosen different colour schemes (for example, orange in the 1985 Irwin Allen production, yellow in the BBC's 1972 and 1986 adaptations as well as the 1999 Hallmark movie and lilac in The Royal Ballet's Alice's Adventures in Wonderland), the blue version has remained the most iconic version.

== Alice in other media ==
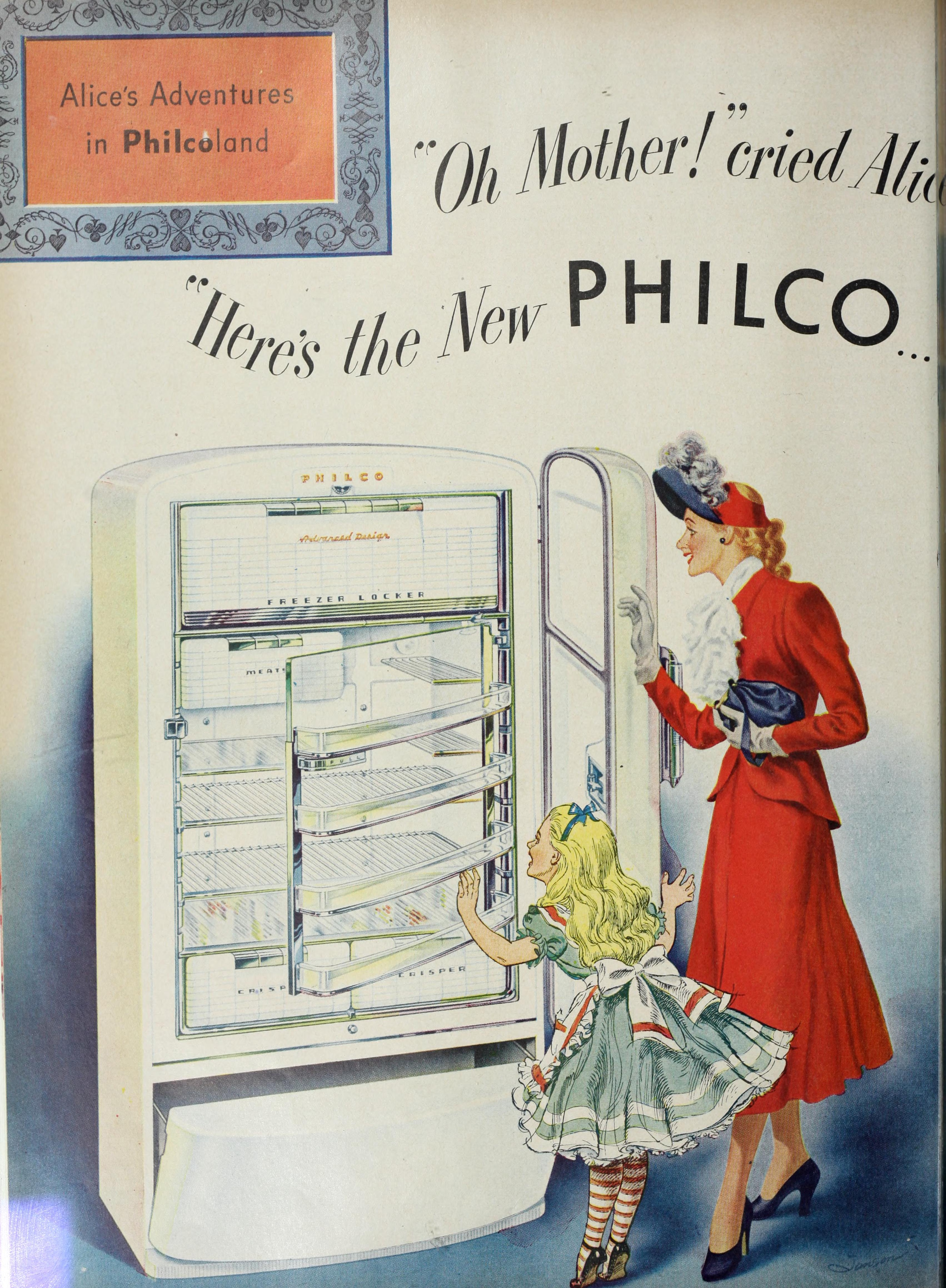
Alice, in a 1948 Ladies' Home Journal advertisement

It became fashionable for young girls to dress up as Alice when wearing fancy dress around the 1880s, by which time the fashion for everyday girls' dresses had changed enough that Alice's attire as depicted in the books had come to seem distinctive.

Dresses explicitly inspired by Alice's were a recurrent feature of the range of the clothes makers Joseph Love, Inc. from the 1930s to the 1960s. The style became especially popular in the US when the Disney movie was released in 1951.

More subtly, Alice's dress has been seen as an influence on Japanese dress styles, exhibited in music videos by, for example, Mizuki Alisa (in the video for her 1991 "Town of Eden"), Kawase Tomoko ("Bloomin'!", 2002) and Kimura Kae ("Snowdome", 2007).

== See also ==
- Dorothy dress
- List of individual dresses

== Notes ==
- Nichols, Catherine (2014). Alice's Wonderland: A Visual Journey Through Lewis Carroll's Mad, Mad World. Race Point Publishing. ISBN 9781937994976.
- Vaclavik, Kiera (2014). "The Dress of the Book: Children's Literature, Fashion and Fancy Dress". In Carrington, Bridget; Harding, Jennifer (eds.). Beyond the Book: Transforming Children's Literature. Newcastle Upon Tyne: Cambridge Scholars' Publishing. pp. 62–76.
- Monden, Masafumi (2014). "Being Alice in Japan: Performing a Cute, "girlish" Revolt". Japan Forum. 26 (2): 265–285. doi:10.1080/09555803.2014.900511. S2CID 143270185.
- Monden, Masafumi (2019). "A Dream Dress for Girls: Milk, Fashion and Shōjo Identity". In Berndt, J. (ed.). Shōjo Across Media. East Asian Popular Culture. Springer. pp. 209–231. doi:10.1007/978-3-030-01485-8_9. ISBN 978-3-030-01484-1. S2CID 194251806.
- Myers, Kali (2016). "Alice in transnational perspective and through the history of replication: an exploration of adult play in Australian art and Japanese shōjo culture". International Journal of Play. 5 (3): 292–305. doi:10.1080/21594937.2016.1217587. S2CID 152235341.
- Brooker, Will (2005). Alice's Adventures: Lewis Carroll in Popular Culture. Bloomsbury Publishing. ISBN 9780826417541.
