= Harry Theaker =

English painter, illustrator (1873–1954)

Harry George Theaker (1873 – 23 January 1954), was an English illustrator, designer, educator, and painter. He is best known for establishing the colours associated with Alice from Alice's Adventures in Wonderland.

In 1911, with the approval of Alice illustrator John Tenniel, he was commissioned by the book's publisher Macmillan to colour sixteen of Tenniel’s plates for an edition of Alice in which he coloured her dress blue – which has remained so in the popular imagination ever since.
