= 1870s in Western fashion =

Bustles and elaborate drapery characterize gowns of the early 1870s. The gentleman wears evening dress. Detail of Too Early by James Tissot, 1873.

1870s fashion in European and European-influenced women's clothing continued the shift of skirt fullness towards the posterior established in the 1860s. Throughout the decade, skirts lost their fullness and became close-fitted, emphasising the natural form of the body while maintaining elaborate rear draperies.

== Women's fashions ==
=== Overview ===
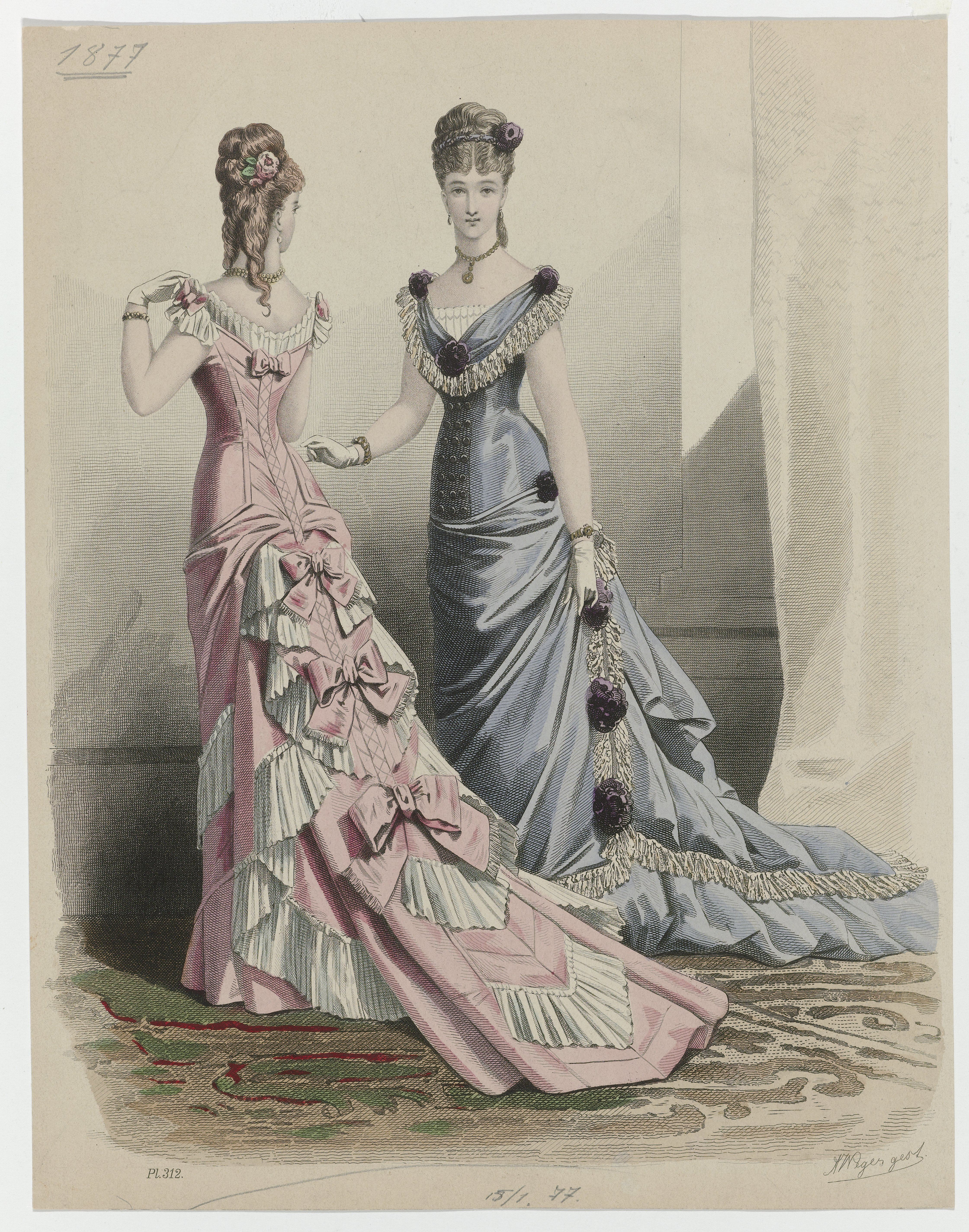
Evening gowns in the late 1870s, with cuirass bodices.

By 1870, skirts remained very full, with an emphasis on the rear. Bodices were short and waistlines sat high, generally straight or with a basque front or peplum detail. Draped overskirts were ubiquitous and held in place by tapes. The skirt was supported by a crinolette early in the decade, and later, as skirts began to slim at the sides, a bustle or pad. Overskirts were frequently arranged to form an apron effect at the front with a 'swag' at the rear sometimes described as a polonaise in reference to the retroussé style of the late-18th century. Underskirts were commonly heavily trimmed, with pleats, flounces, ruching, and frills especially popular during the first half of the decade.

During the second half of the decade, the bustle began to diminish and the fashionable line became long and tightly fitting: bodices were cut as long, boned cuirass forms extending over the hips, or as one-piece princess-line garments with trained skirts. Fullness dropped into the lower back and train rather than projecting from the waist, often with structured supports.

Across the decade, day dresses had high necklines that were either closed, squared, or V-shaped. Sleeves were somewhat loose and coat-like, with a tendency to flare at the end, often with a decorative cuff.

Evening gowns had wide necklines, often accentuated with a bertha style collar, and very short, off-the-shoulder sleeves. Early in the period, short gloves were worn for evening, but these gave way to medium lengths later on. A velvet ribbon tied high around the neck was popular for both day and evening, with a brief vogue for especially long ribbons for evening in a revival of the Georgian era.

=== Tea gowns and artistic dress ===
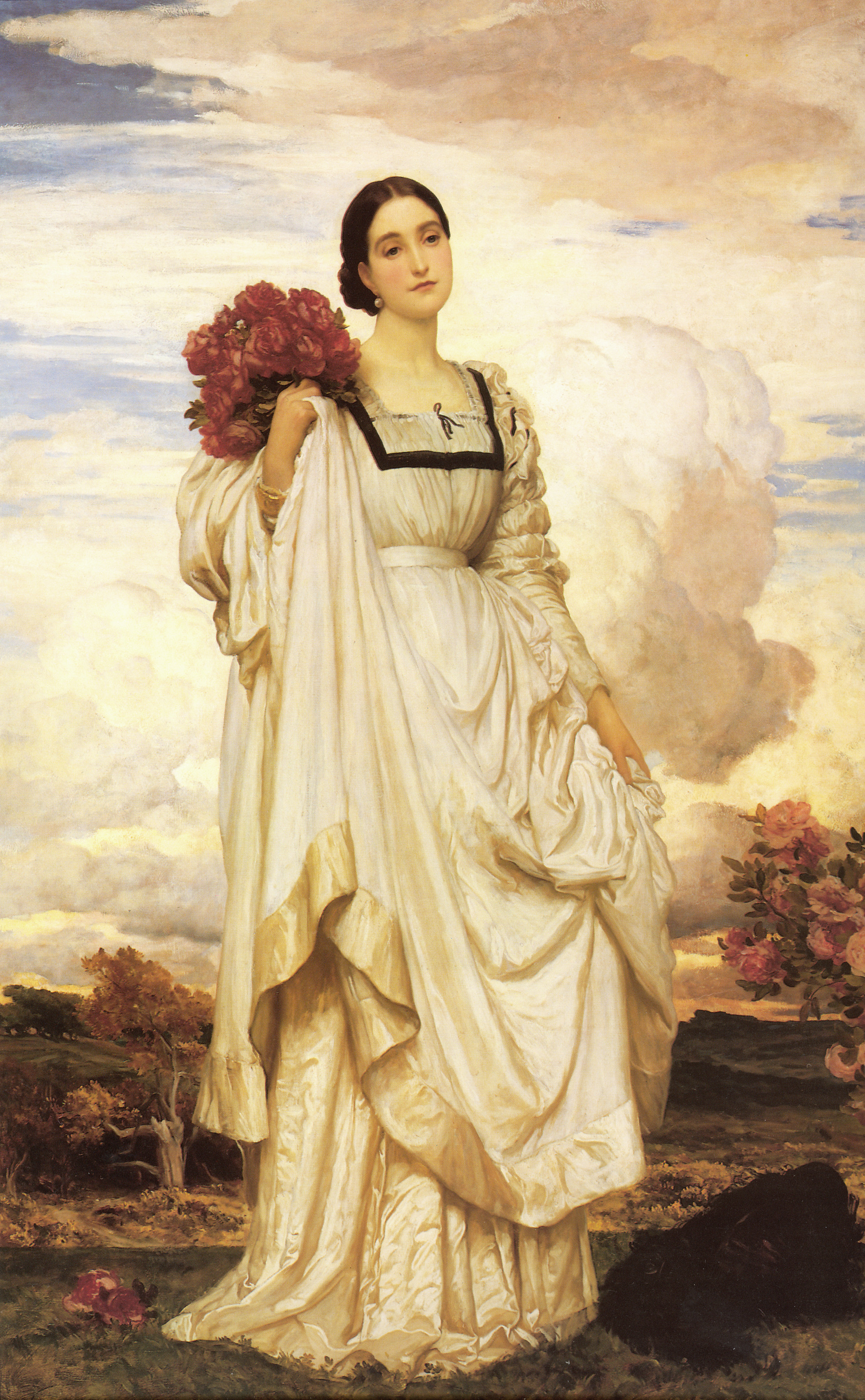
Countess Brownlow in artistic dress, 1879

Artistic dress developed under the influence of the Pre-Raphaelite Brotherhood and other artistic reformers. In contrast with the fashion of the period, artistic dress sought inspiration from eastern, medieval and historicist sources, prioritising the naturalistic lines of the body that became fashionable late in the decade. Tea gowns, informal dresses won in the home for receiving guests, combined Pre-Raphaelite influences with the loose sack-back gowns of the 18th century.

=== Leisure Dress ===
Leisure dress was becoming an important part of a woman's wardrobe. Seaside dress in England was especially popular in this period, often made in sheer fabrics with colorful trims.

=== Undergarments ===
During the early decade, a high waist and low, wide bust was in style, aided by a corset with a higher hip line. As the decade progressed, the corset lengthened and became more curvaceous. Steam-molding, patented in 1868, helped hold the new contour.

Skirts began supported by a hybrid elliptical crinoline or hooped petticoat sometimes referred to as a "crinolette". The cage structure was attached around the waist and had hoops all around but with a particular emphasis in the rear. The crinolette itself was soon superseded by the bustle, which was sufficient for supporting the drapery and train at the back of the skirt. The bustle shrank and lengthened during the final years of the decade as the drapery of the skirt moved lower down the legs.

=== Hairstyles and headgear ===
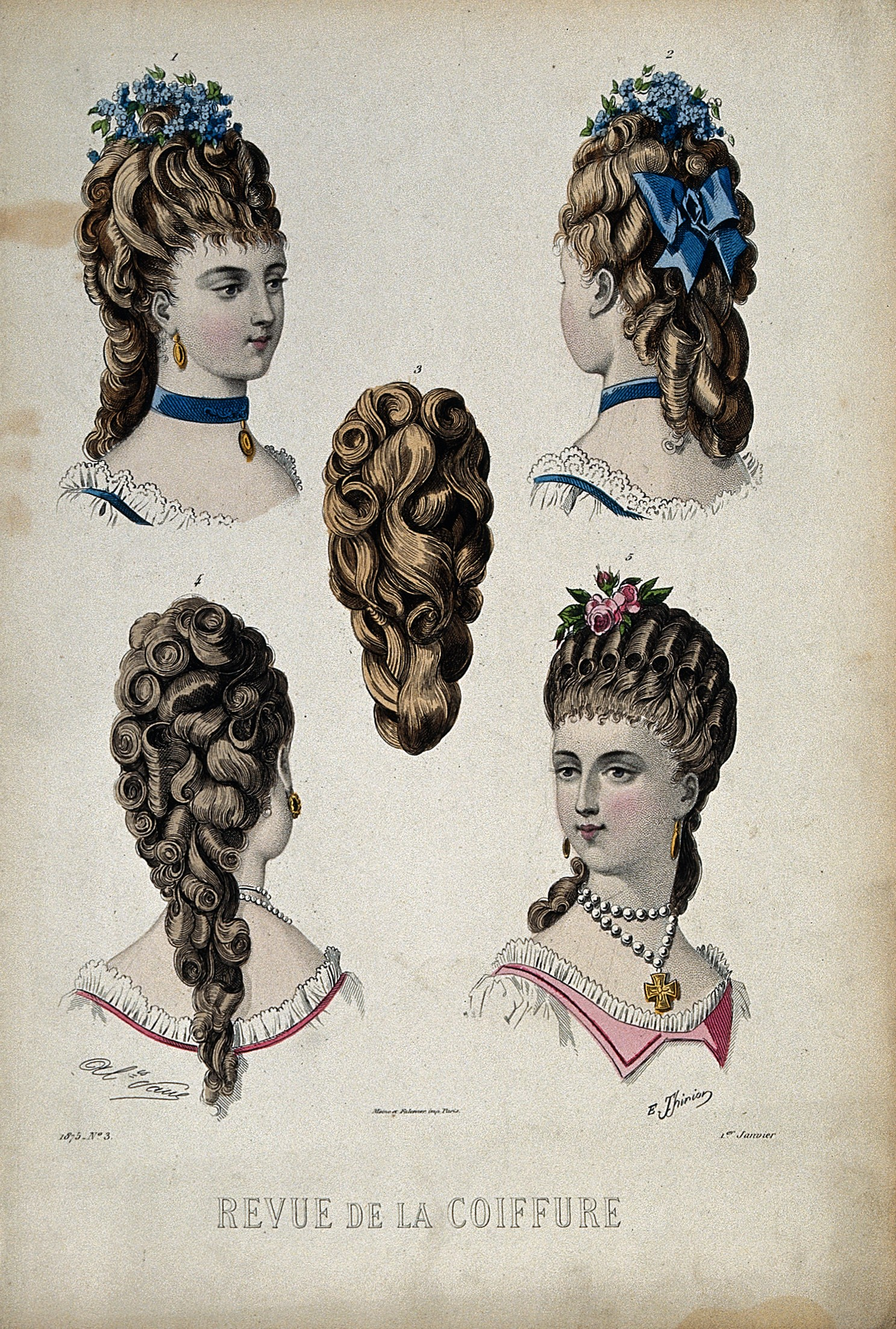
An engraving from 1875 displaying fashionable hair.

Fashionable hair during this period was particularly tall and ornamented, generally pulled back at the sides and worn high, with false hair being commonly used. A cluster of ringlets at the nape of the neck was popular, as was fringe (bangs) over the forehead. Bonnets were smaller to allow for the elaborately piled hairstyles. Small hats, often worn with veils, were perched on top of the head, and brimmed straw hats were worn for outdoor wear in summer.

=== Wraps and Overcoats ===
The main kind of wrap that dominated in the 1870s were capes and jackets that had a back vent in order to make room for the bustle. Some examples are the pelisse and the paletot coat.

=== Style gallery 1870–1874 ===
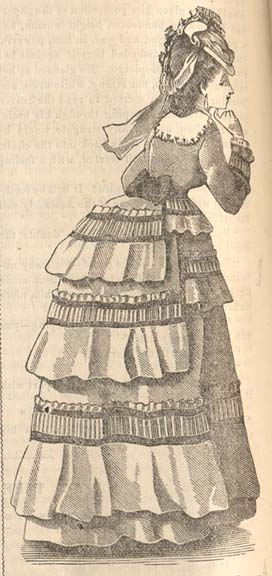
1 – 1870

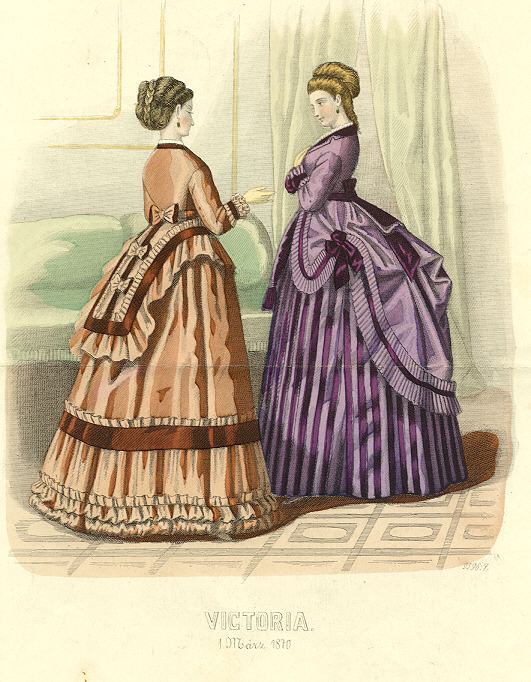
2 – 1870

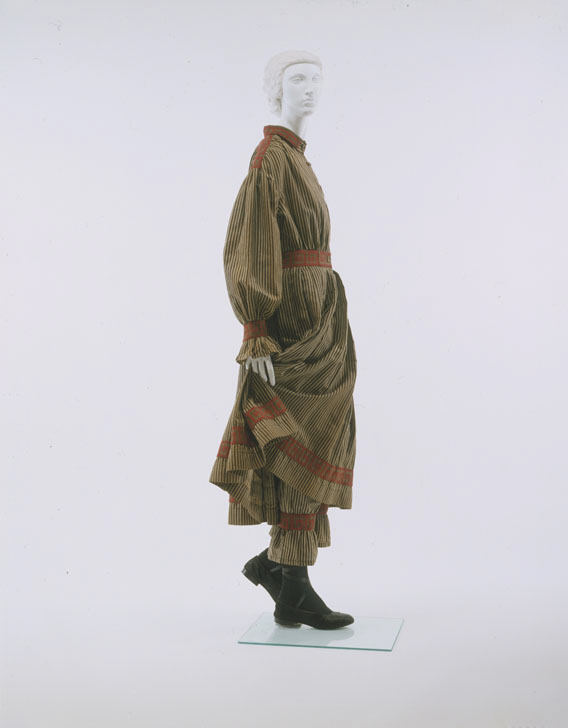
3 – 1870s bathing dress

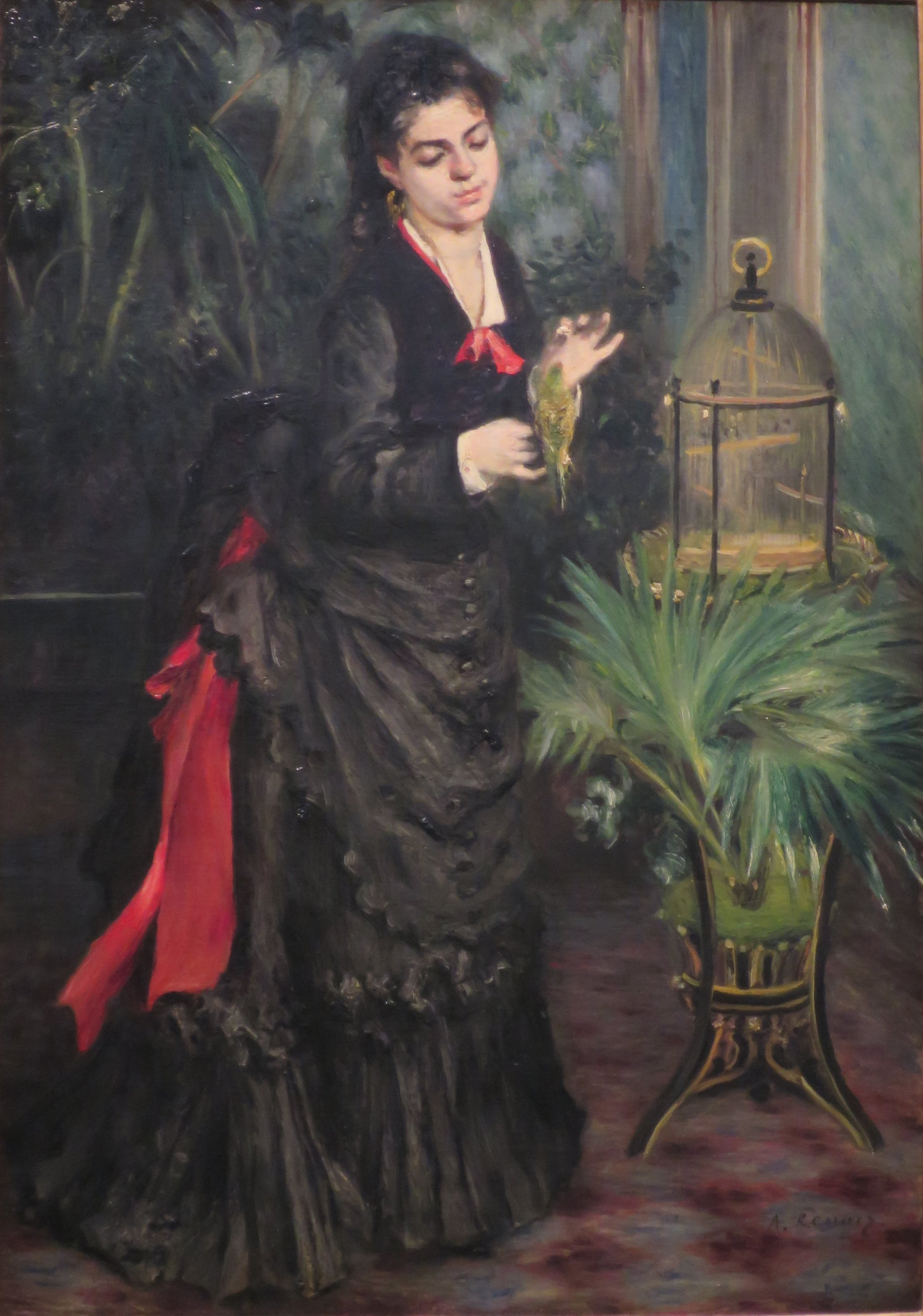
4 – 1871

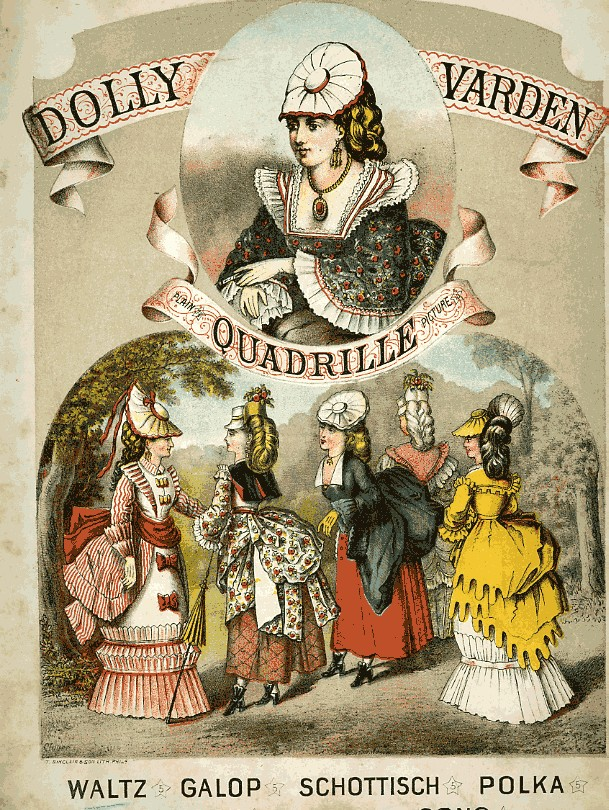
5 – 1872

6 – 1872–73

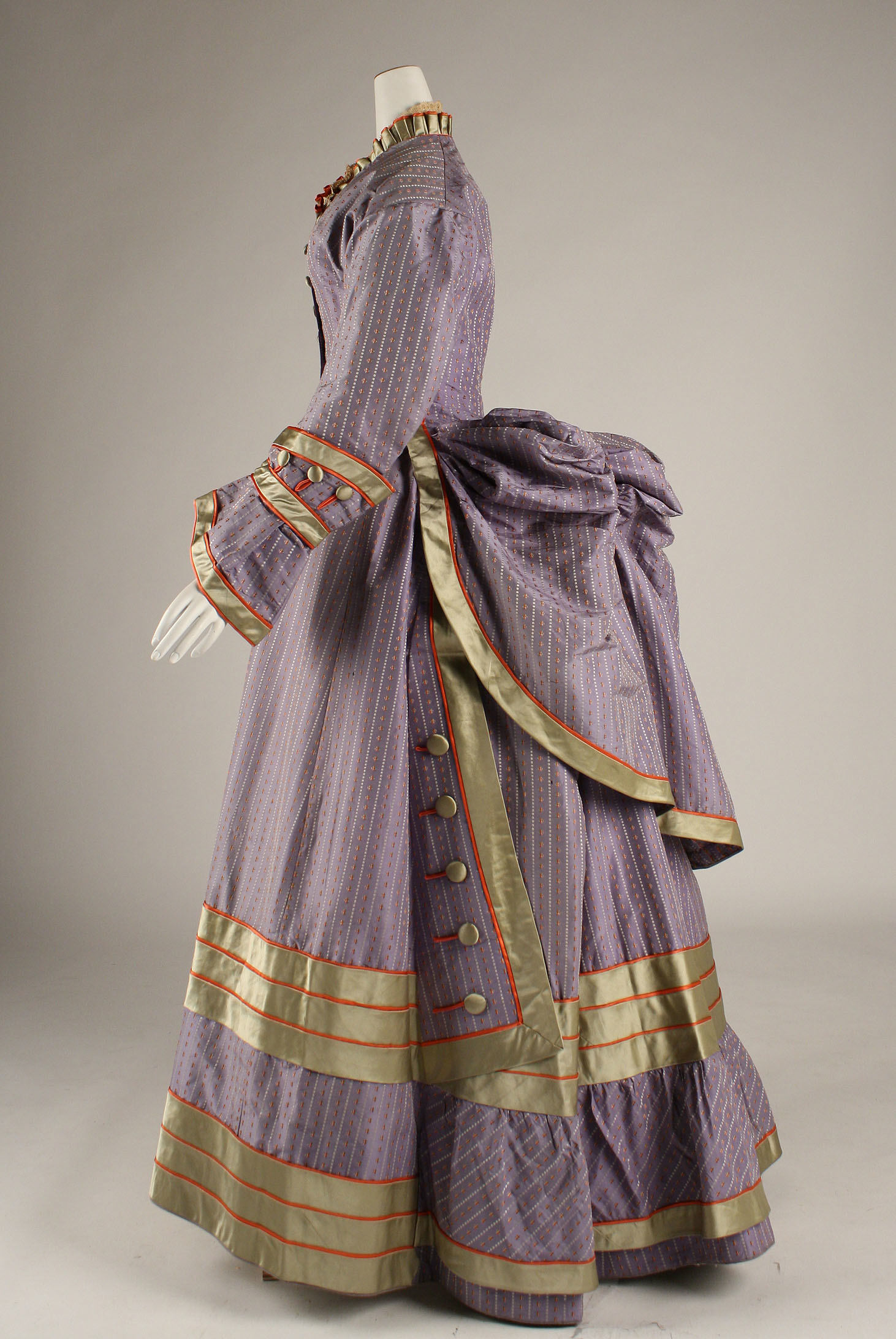
7 – 1872–75

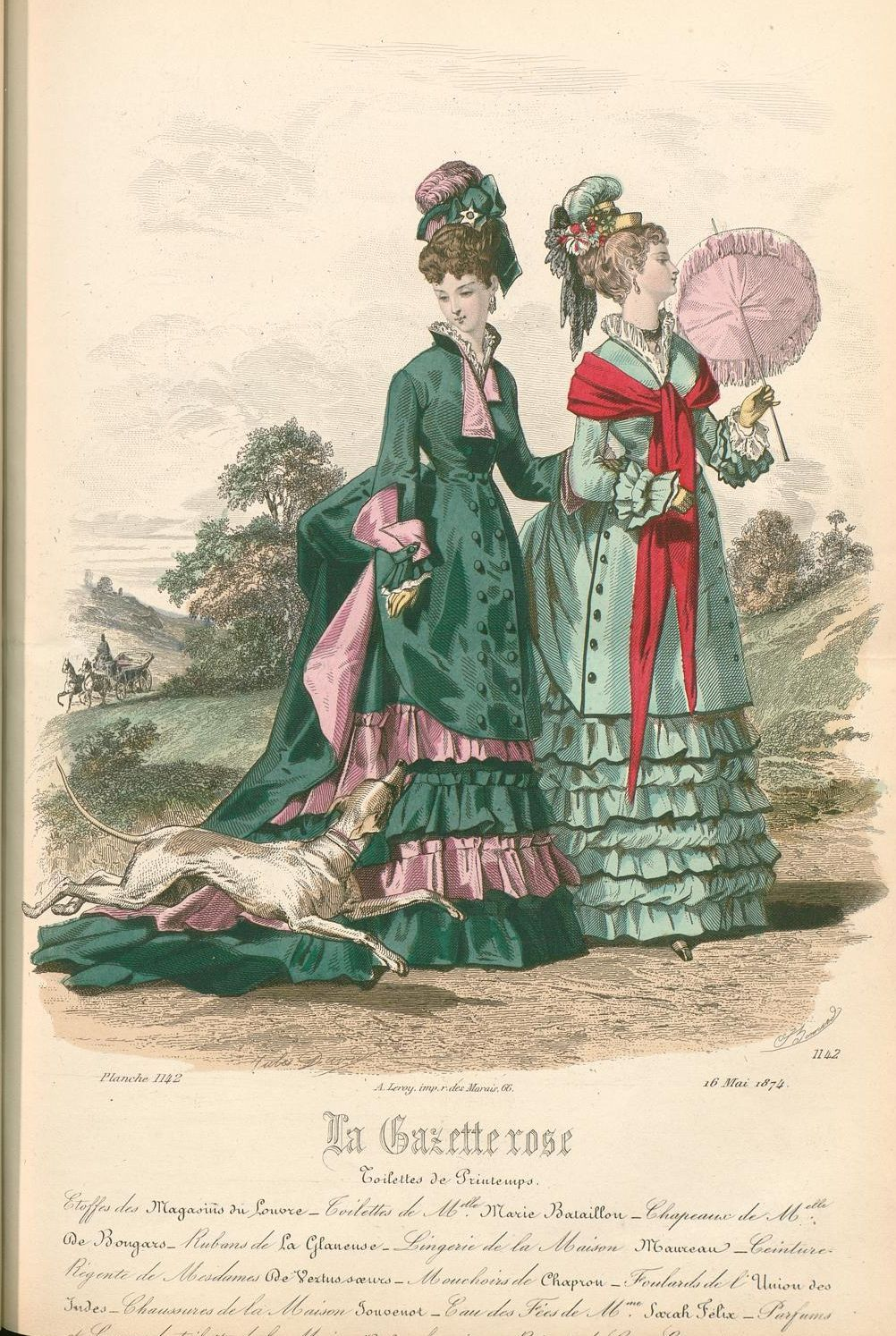
8 – 1874

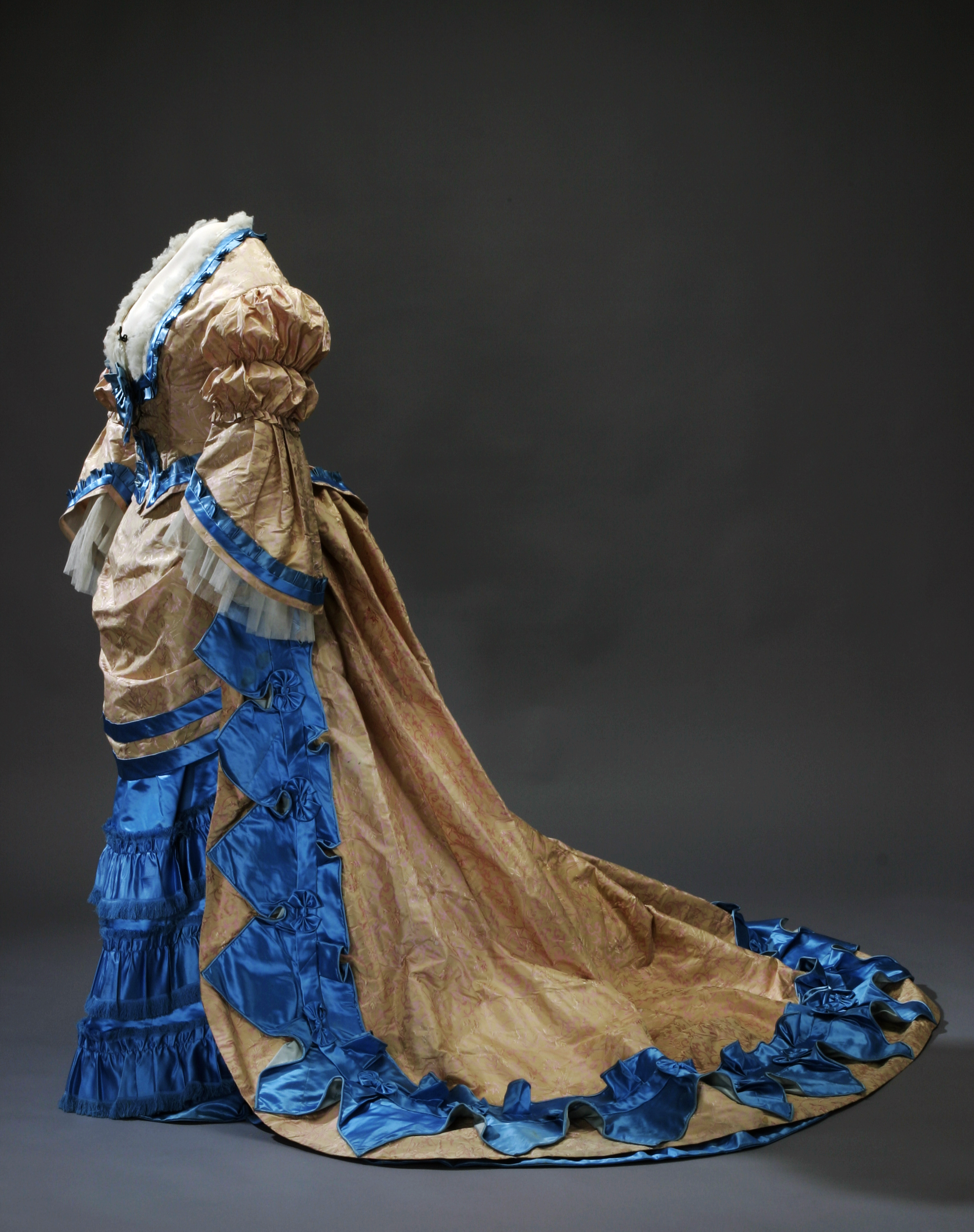
9 – c. 1874

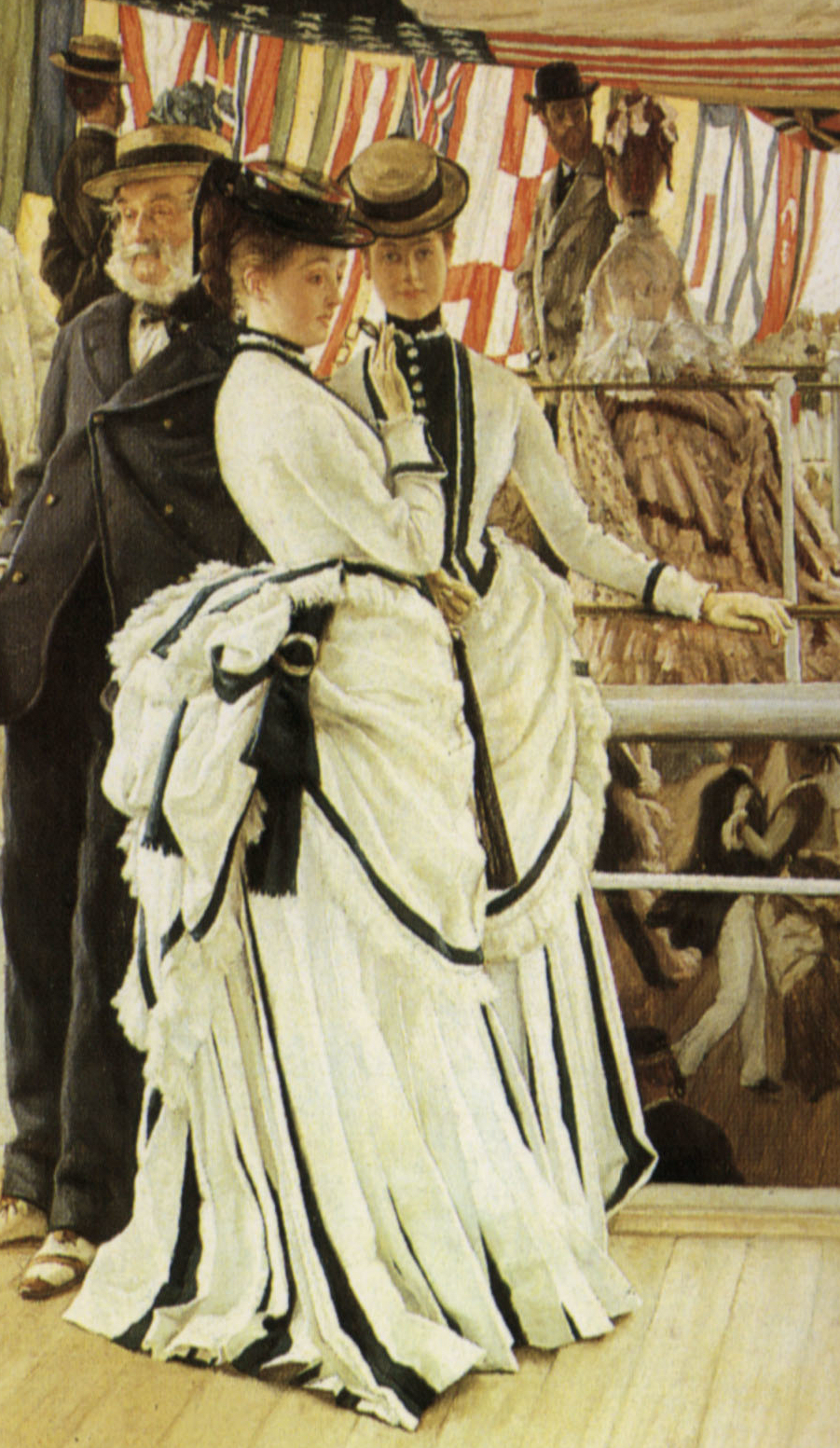
10 – c. 1874

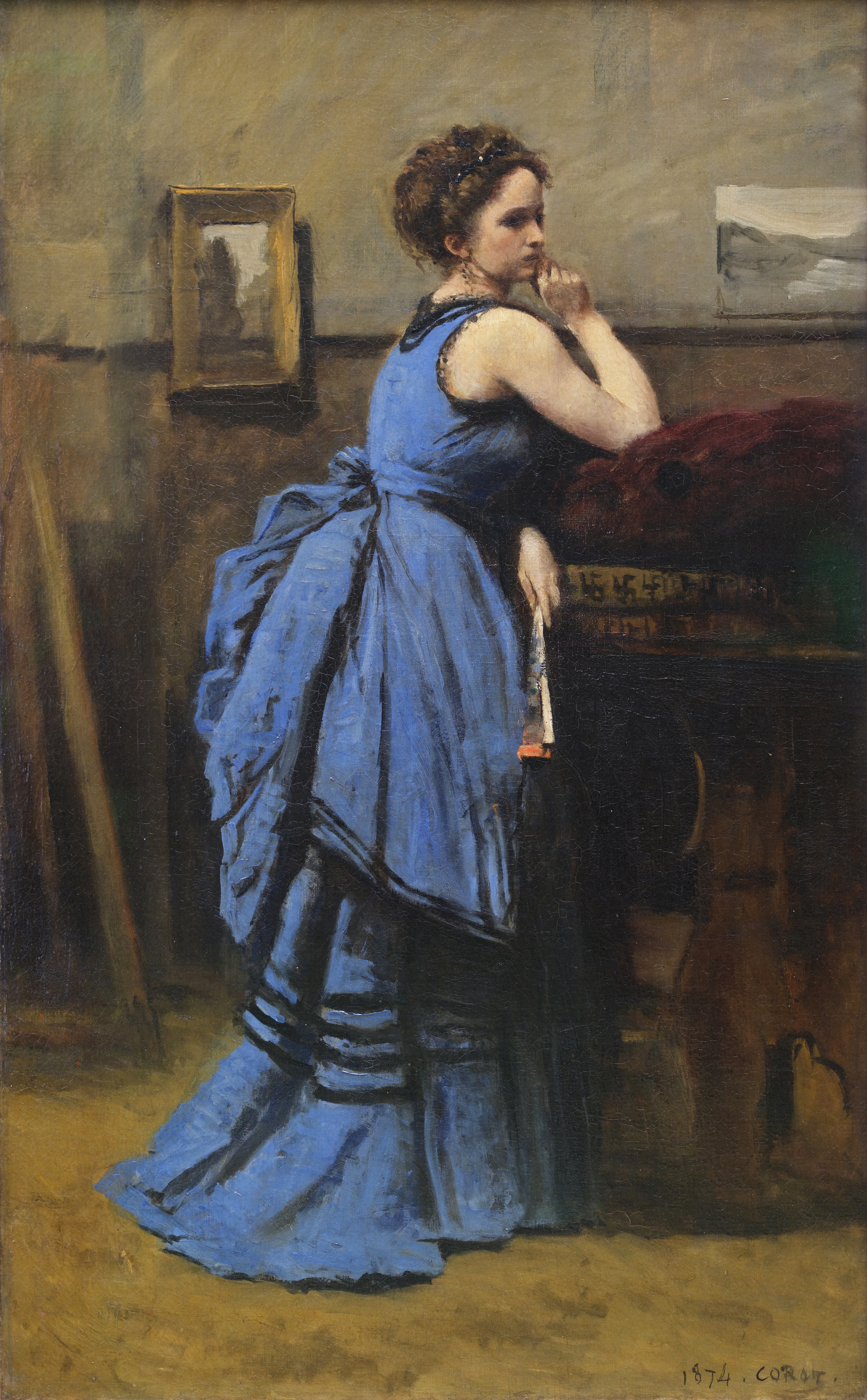
11 – 1874

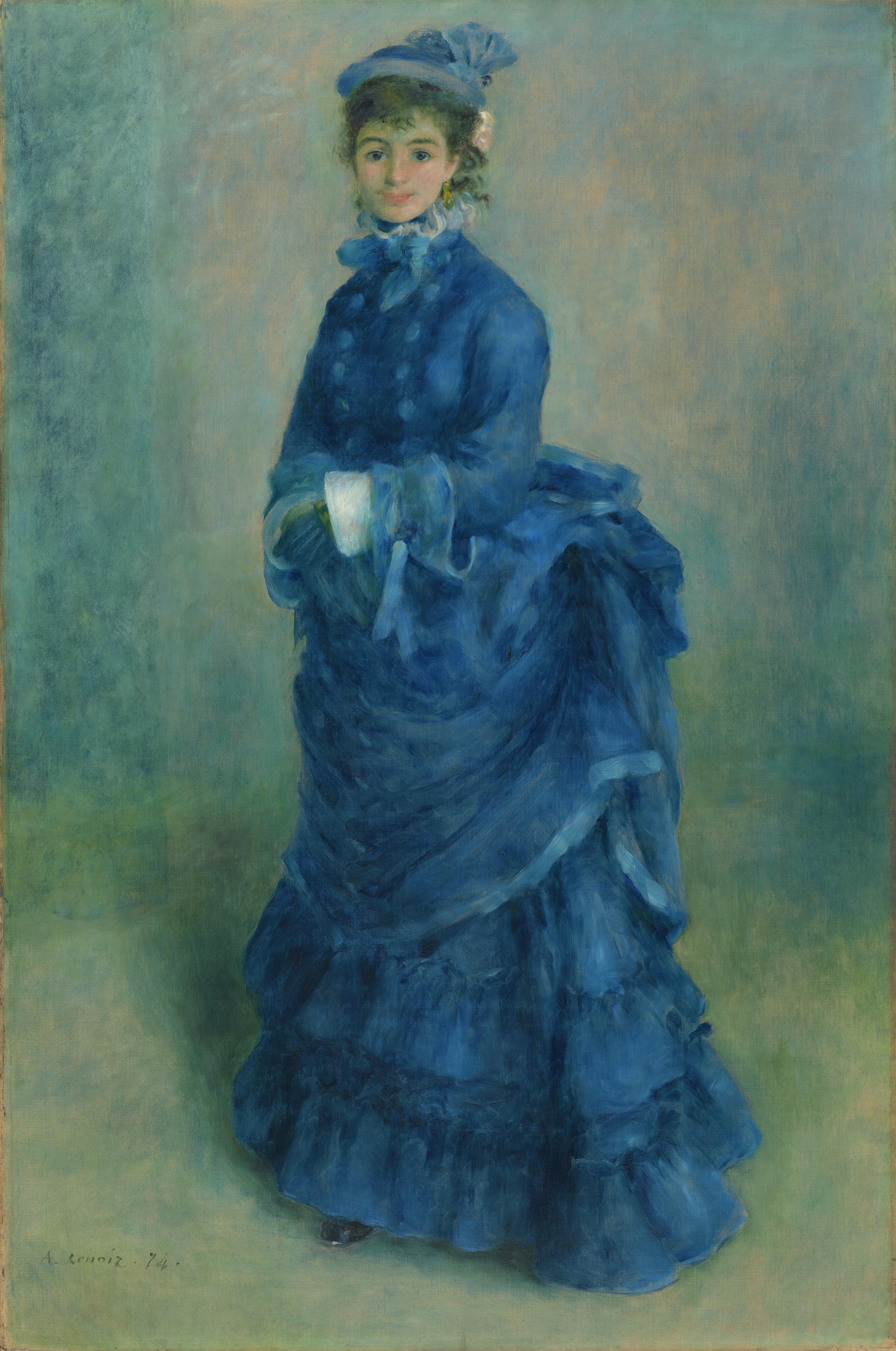
12 – 1874
1. Walking dress of 1870 with a tiered and ruffled skirt back.
2. 1870 fashion plate shows jacket-bodices with draped and trimmed skirts in back. Ruffles and pleated frills are characteristic trimmings of the 1870s.
3. 1870s American bathing dress, with ankle length skirt, long pants, and long sleeves
4. French morning dress of 1871 features a narrow red ribbon at the low neckline and a large matching bow with streamers at the back waist.
5. Dolly Varden dresses of 1872 demonstrate the popular fashion of the early 1870s known as "Dolly Varden"
6. Artistic dress of the early 1870s. Portrait of Mrs. Frances Leyland by Whistler.
7. Day dress ca 1872-75s, purple silk
8. Outdoor dresses of 1874 feature overskirts caught up with buckled ribbons. Jacket-bodices have cuffs and high necklines. Small straw hats with flat crowns and long ribbons (similar to men's boaters) are worn tipped forward.
9. Gala dress ca 1874.
10. Backview of a dress of 1874 shows the draping of the overskirt and the slight train on the underskirt. France.
11. Dress of 1874 with draped overskirt and ruffled underskirt.

=== Style gallery 1874–1878 ===
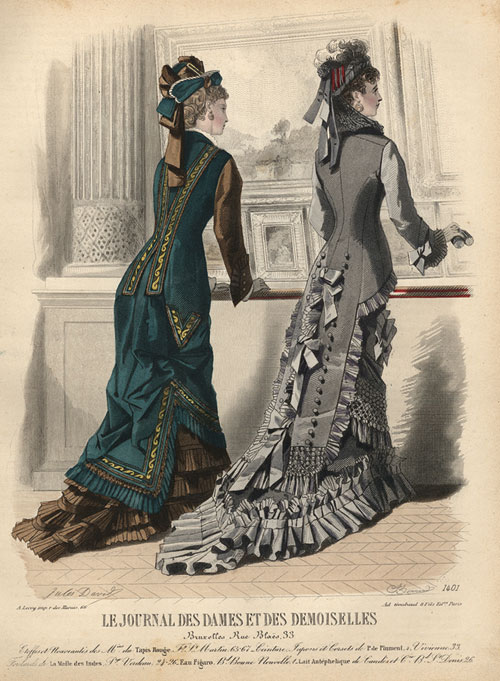
1 – 1874–1876

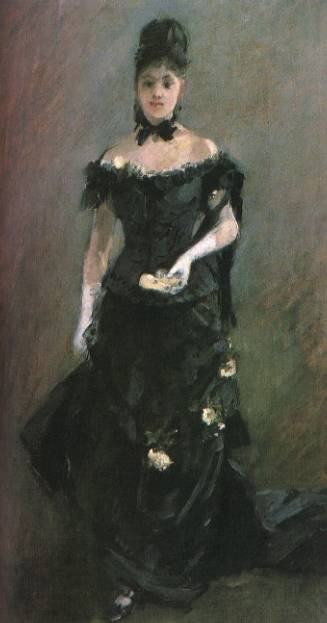
2 – 1875–76

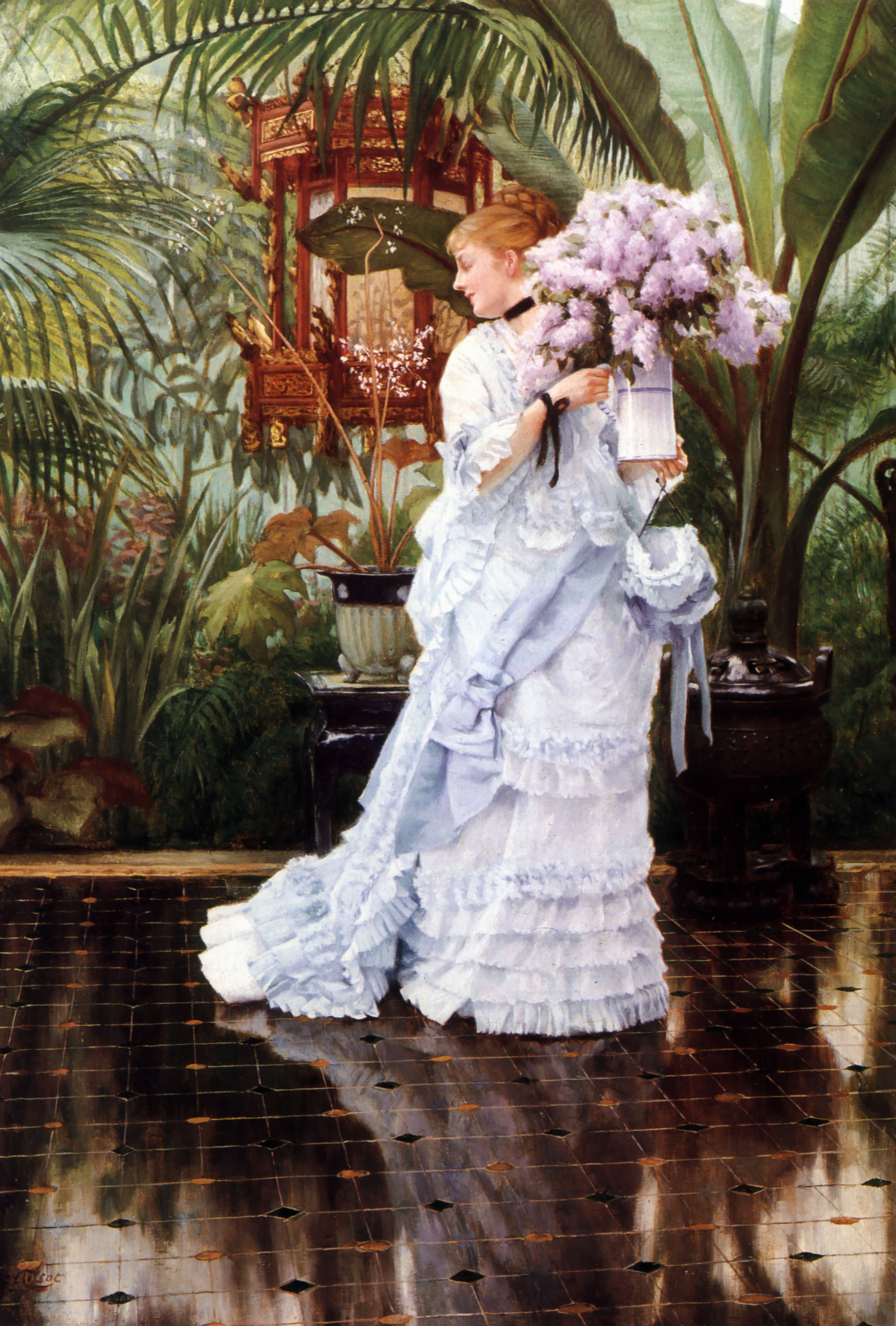
3 – c. 1875

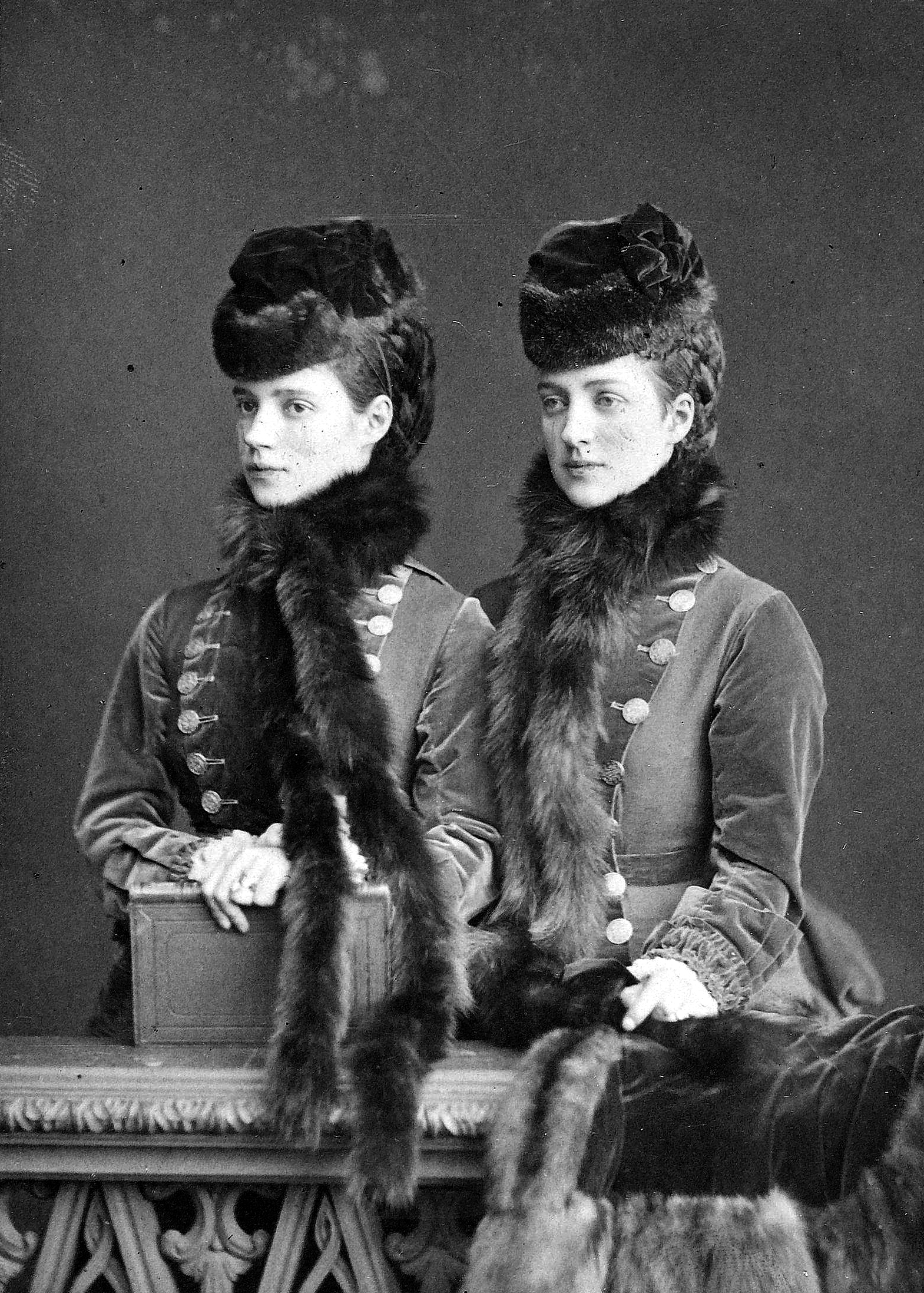
4 – 1875

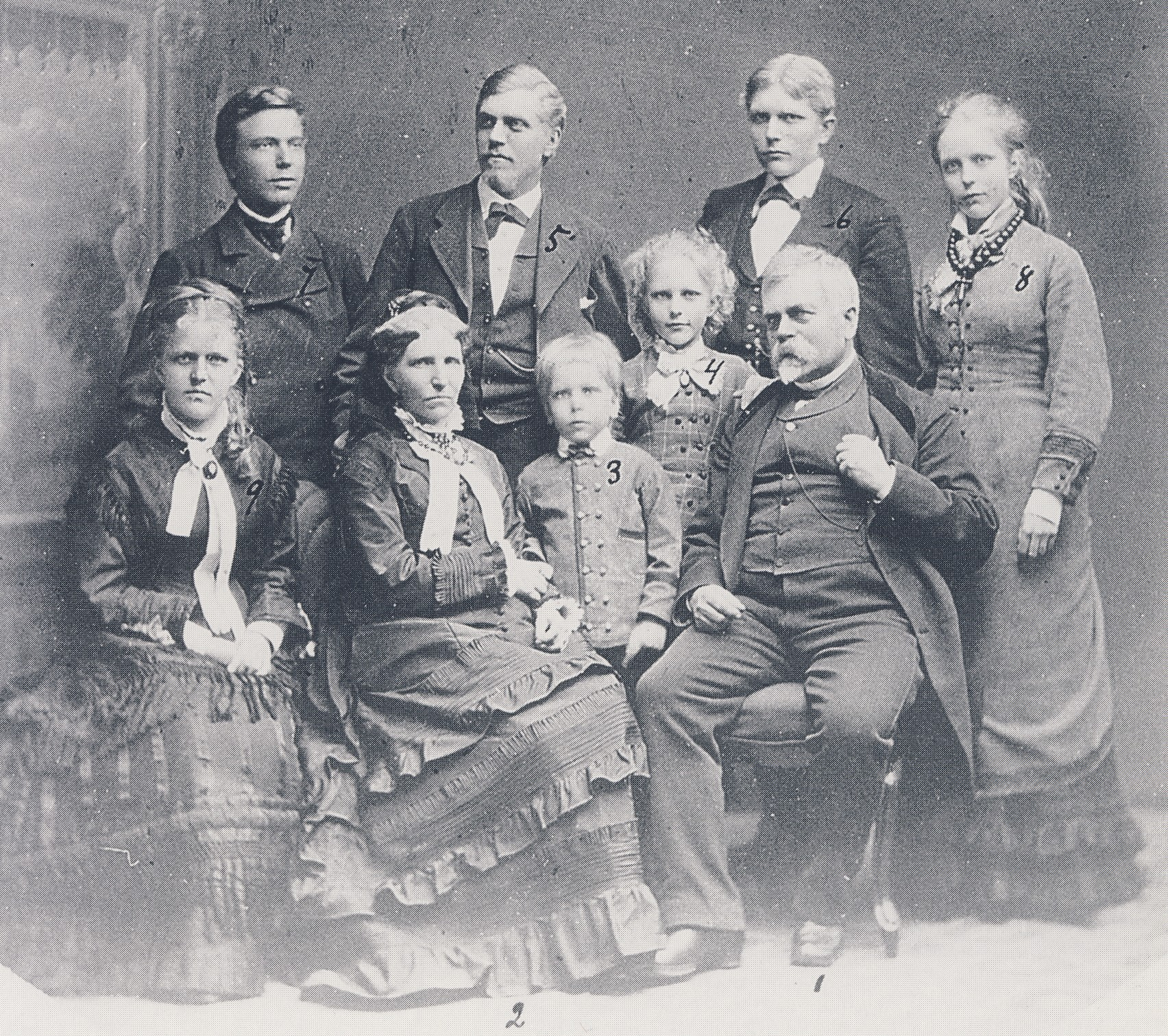
5 – 1875

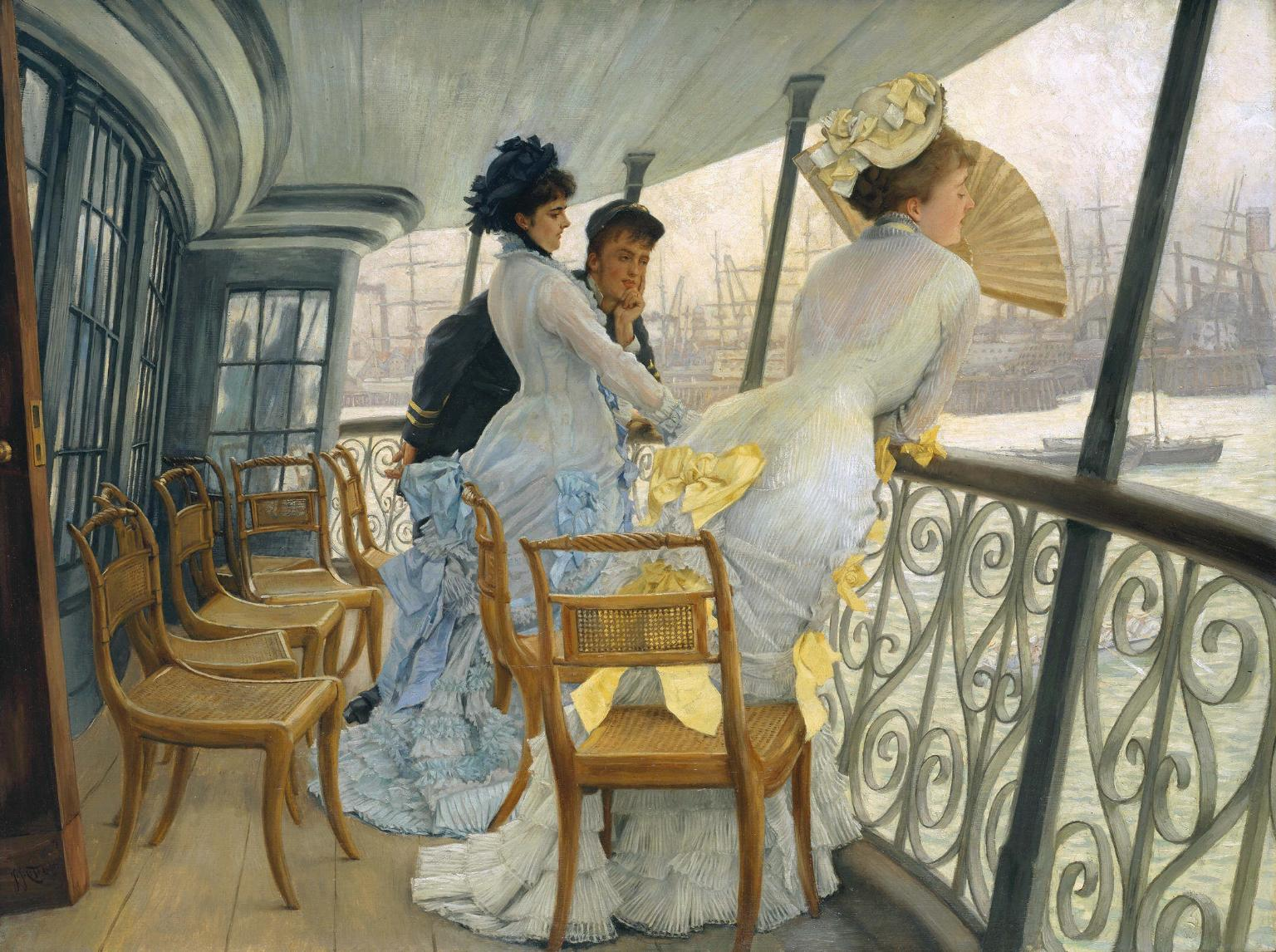
6 – c. 1877

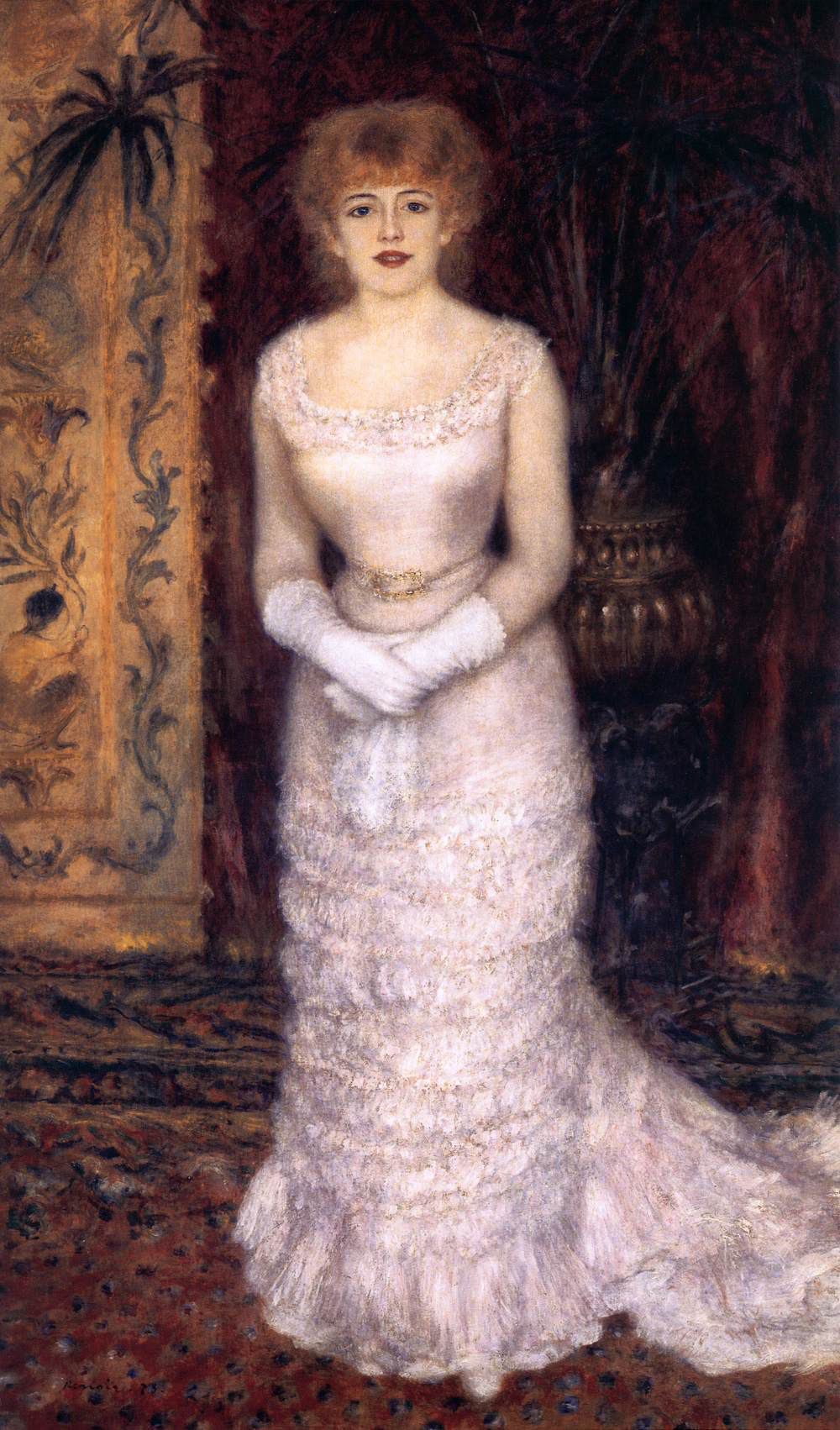
7 – 1878

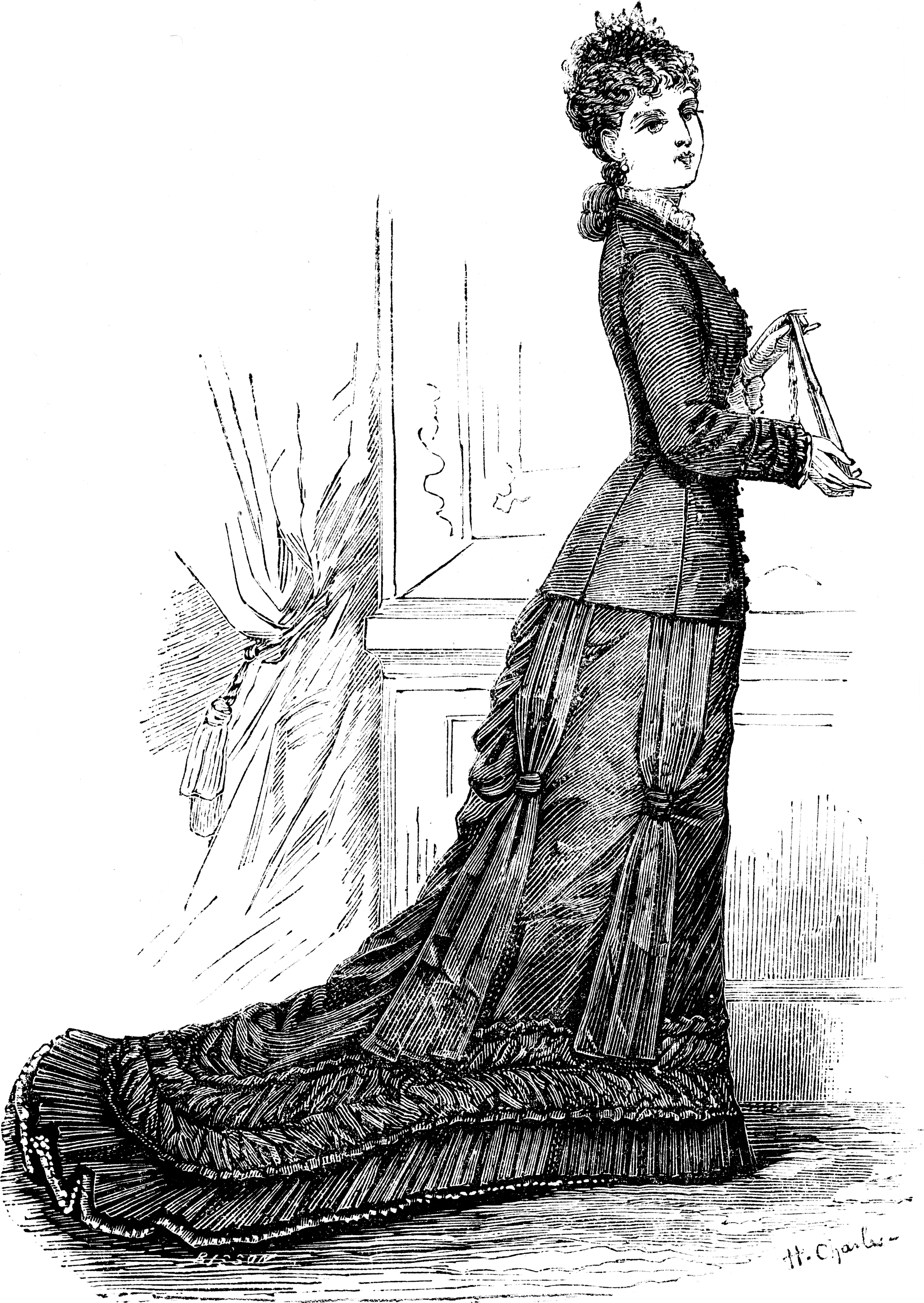
8 – 1878

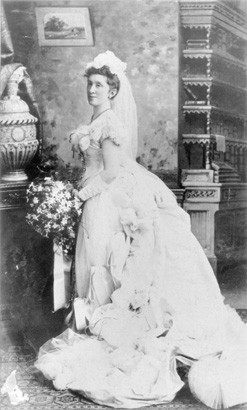
9 –1876

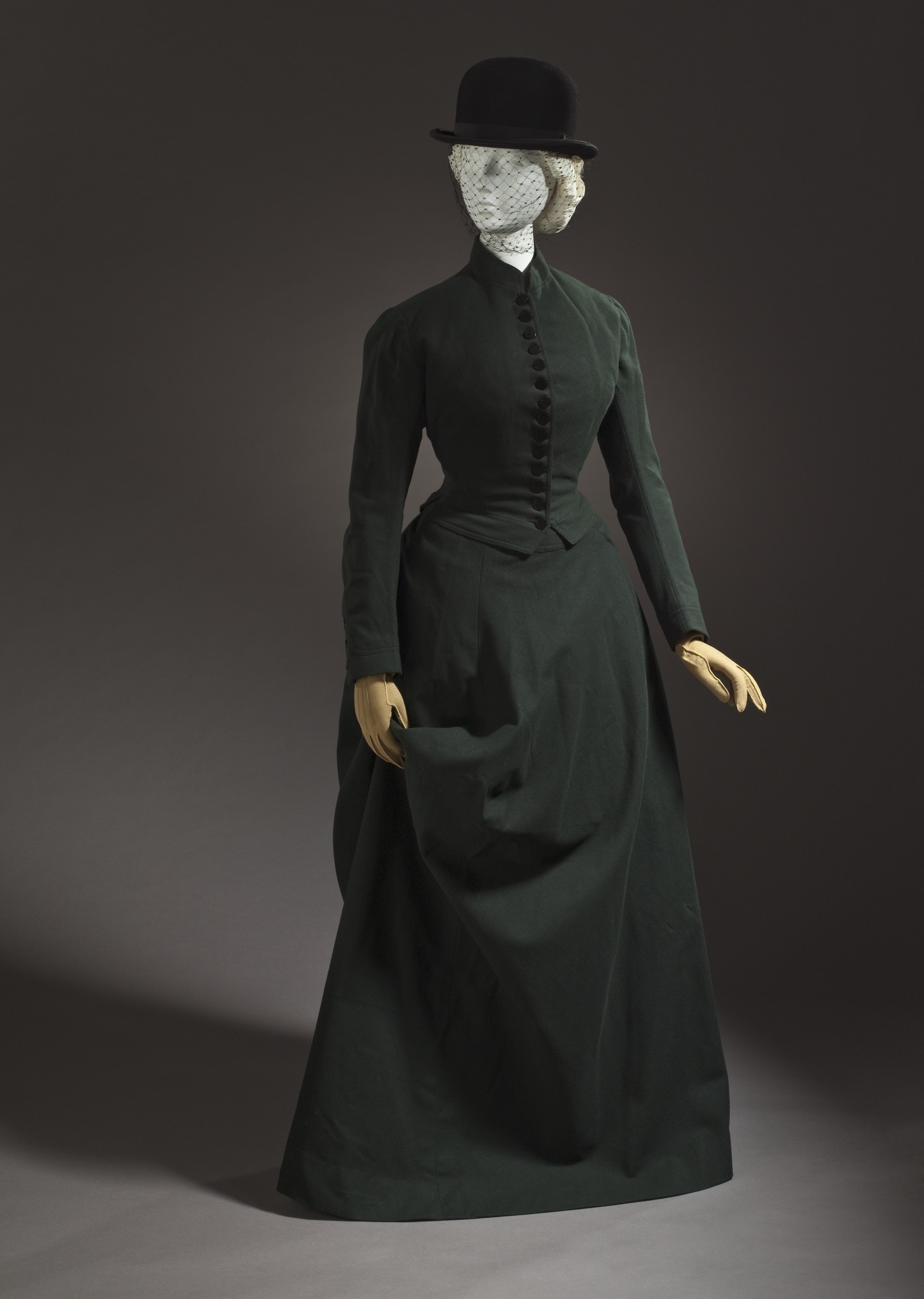
10 — c. 1878
1. Tight dresses with long trains of the mid-1870s are trimmed with pleated ruffles, bows, buttons, and braid, and are worn with hats with ribbon streamers.
2. French gown is festooned with flowers and is worn with mid-length white gloves and a black neck ribbon. The high-knotted hairstyle is typical of the mid-1870s.
3. Morning dress of c. 1875 has a trailing overskirt and is trimmed with a profusion of ruffles and ribbons. Hair is braided into a crown high on the head.
4. Princesses Dagmar and Alexandra of Denmark in 1875.
5. Scholander family portrait in 1875.
6. Semi-sheer dresses of c. 1877 show back fullness beginning at hip-level rather than the waist as in 1874–75. The tight, princess-line dress on the right fits smoothly to the body from the shoulders to the lower hips.
7. Gown of 1878 has a long train and a squared neckline. It is worn with opera-length gloves.
8. Jacket and skirt costume of 1878 features a long train trimmed with pleated frills and ruching. Matching ruching trims the cuffs of the sleeves.
9. Court gown worn by Margaret Forrest in 1876 featuring a train, long white gloves and the three white ostrich feathers representing the Prince of Wales plumes in the hair.
10. Hunting costume is made of green wool, Scotland, c. 1878.

=== Caricature gallery ===
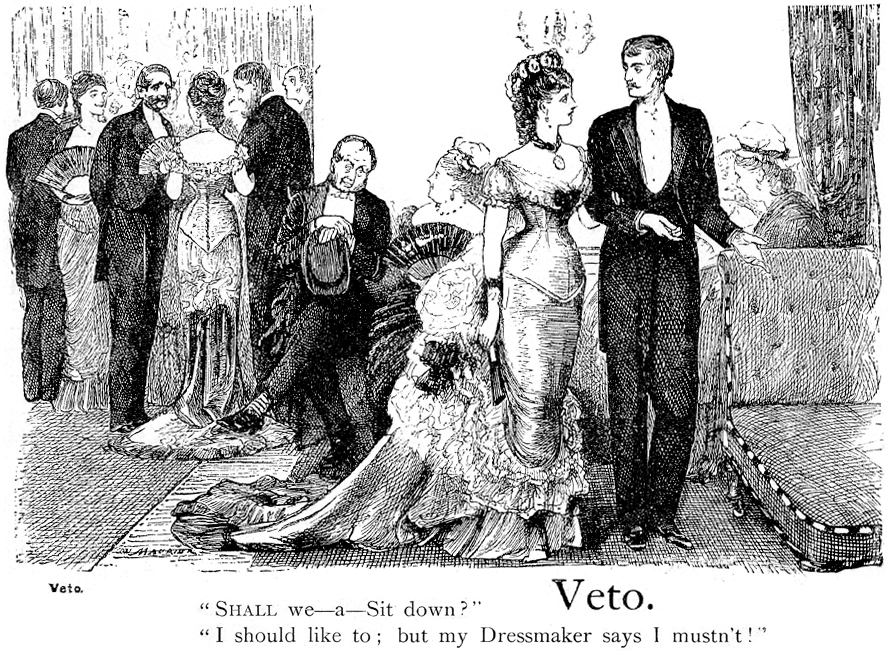
1 – late 1870s

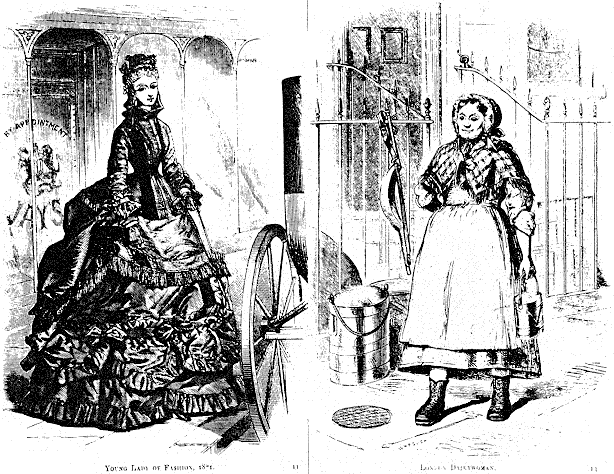
2 – 1871

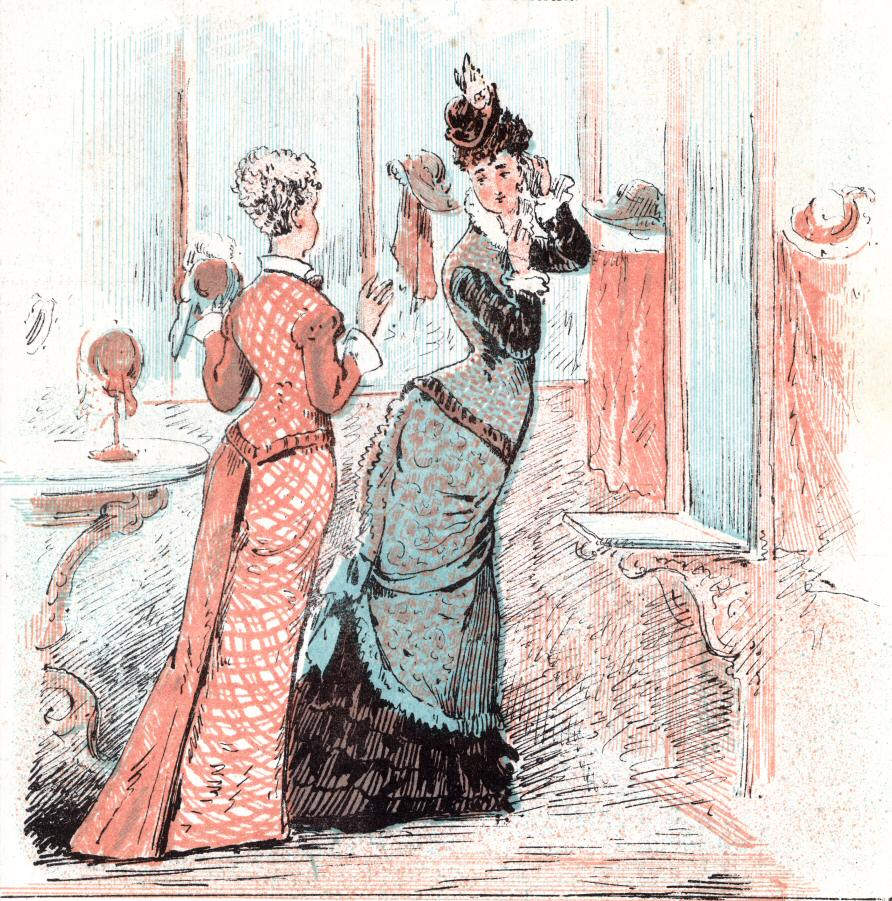
3 – 1876

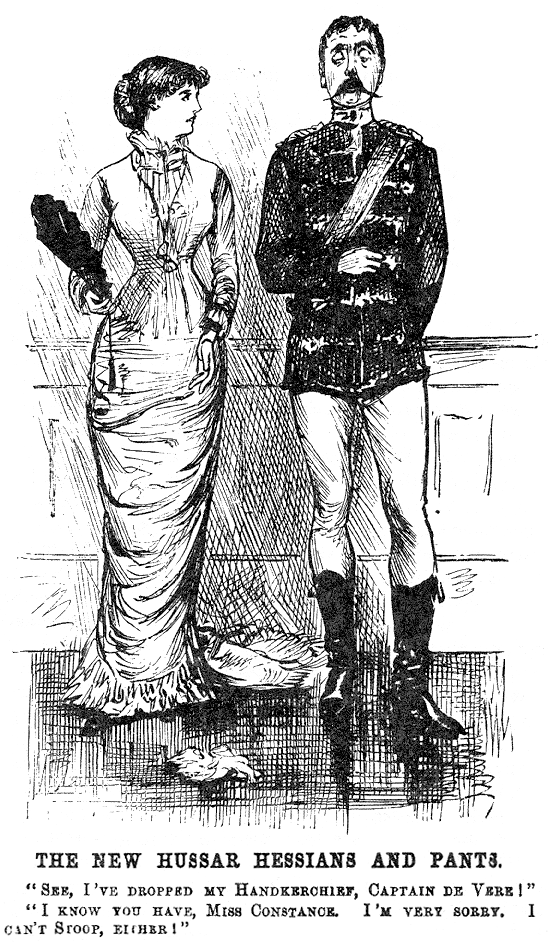
4 – 1878
1. Cartoon "Veto" by George du Maurier from Punch, satirizing the tight dress styles of the late 1870s.
2. An extreme class contrast: "Young lady of fashion, 1871" vs. "London Dairywoman".
3. From the Danish Punch, satirizing the general fashion in 1876
4. Cartoon by George du Maurier from Punch, May 25, 1878, satirizing both impractical women's fashions and men's formal military uniforms.

== Men's fashion ==
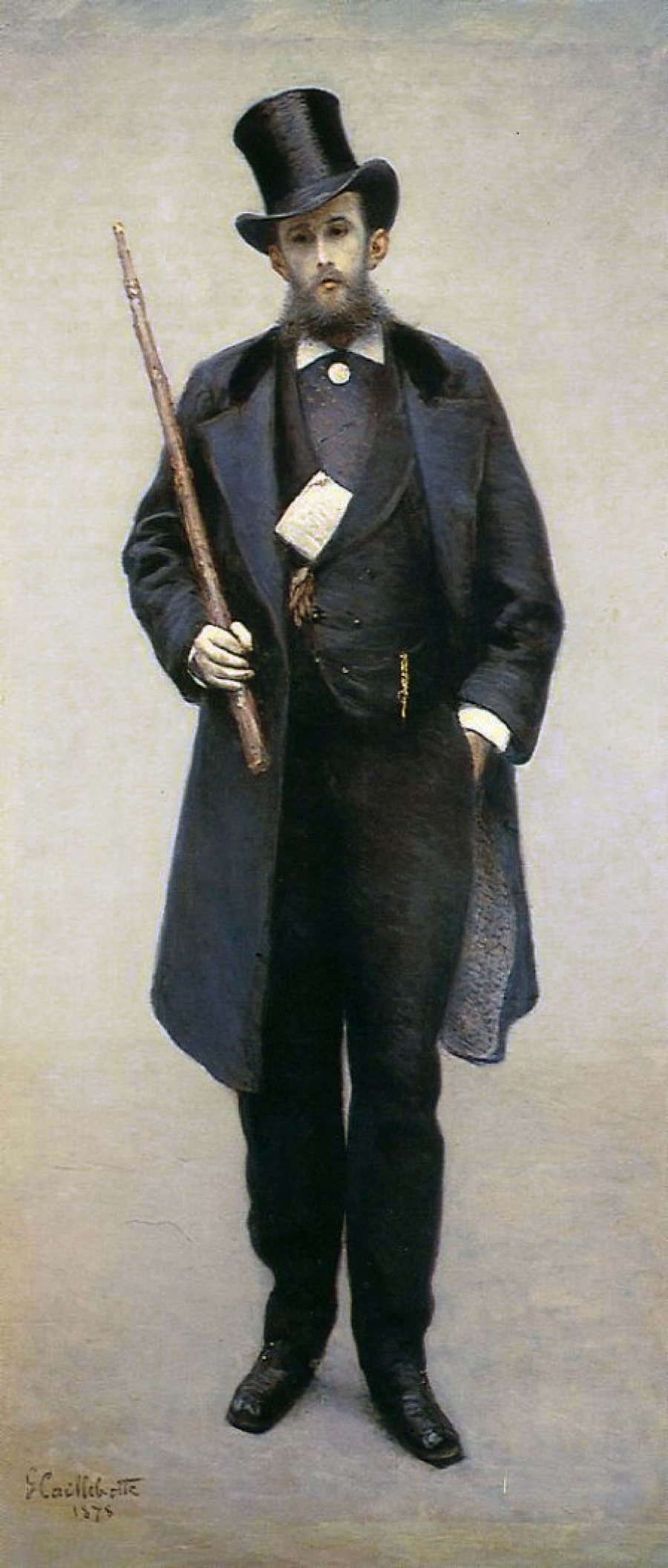
Paris fashion of 1878 features a coat with a contrasting collar, a waistcoat decorated with a watch chain, wide ascot tie, square-toed shoes, and a top hat

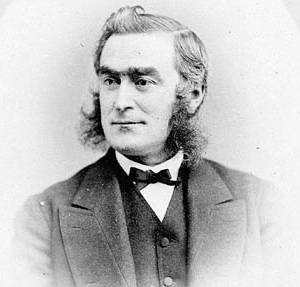
Canadian legislator John Charles Rykert wears a narrow ribbon necktie and a collarless waistcoat. His coat has wide lapels. 1873.

Innovations in men's fashion of the 1870s included the acceptance of patterned or figured fabrics for shirts and the general replacement of neckties tied in bow knots with the four-in-hand and later the ascot tie.

=== Coats and trousers ===
Frock coats remained fashionable, but new shorter versions arose, distinguished from the sack coat by a waist seam. Waistcoats (U.S. vests) were generally cut straight across the front and had collars and lapels, but collarless waistcoats were also worn.

Three-piece suits consisting of a high-buttoned sack coat with matching waistcoat and trousers, called ditto suits or (UK) lounge suits, grew in popularity; the sack coat might be cutaway so that only the top button could be fastened.

The cutaway morning coat was still worn for informal day occasions in Europe and major cities elsewhere. Frock coats were required for more formal daytime dress. Formal evening dress remained a dark tail coat and trousers. The coat now fastened lower on the chest and had wider lapels. A new fashion was a dark rather than white waistcoat. Evening wear was worn with a white bow tie and a shirt with the new winged collar.

Topcoats had wide lapels and deep cuffs, and often featured contrasting velvet collars. Furlined full-length overcoats were luxury items in the coldest climates.

Full-length trousers were worn for most occasions; tweed or woollen breeches were worn for hunting and hiking.

In 1873, Levi Strauss and Jacob Davis began to sell the original copper-riveted blue jeans in San Francisco. These became popular with the local multitude of gold seekers, who wanted strong clothing with durable pockets.

=== Shirts and neckties ===
The points of high upstanding shirt collars were increasingly pressed into "wings".

Necktie fashions included the four-in-hand and, toward the end of the decade, the ascot tie, a tie with wide wings and a narrow neckband, fastened with a jewel or stickpin. Ties knotted in a bow remained a conservative fashion, and a white bowtie was required with formal evening wear.

A narrow ribbon tie was an alternative for tropical climates, and was increasingly worn elsewhere, especially in the Americas.

=== Accessories ===
Top hats remained a requirement for upper class formal wear; bowlers and soft felt hats in a variety of shapes were worn for more casual occasions, and flat straw boaters were worn for yachting and other nautical pastimes.

=== Style gallery 1870–1875 ===
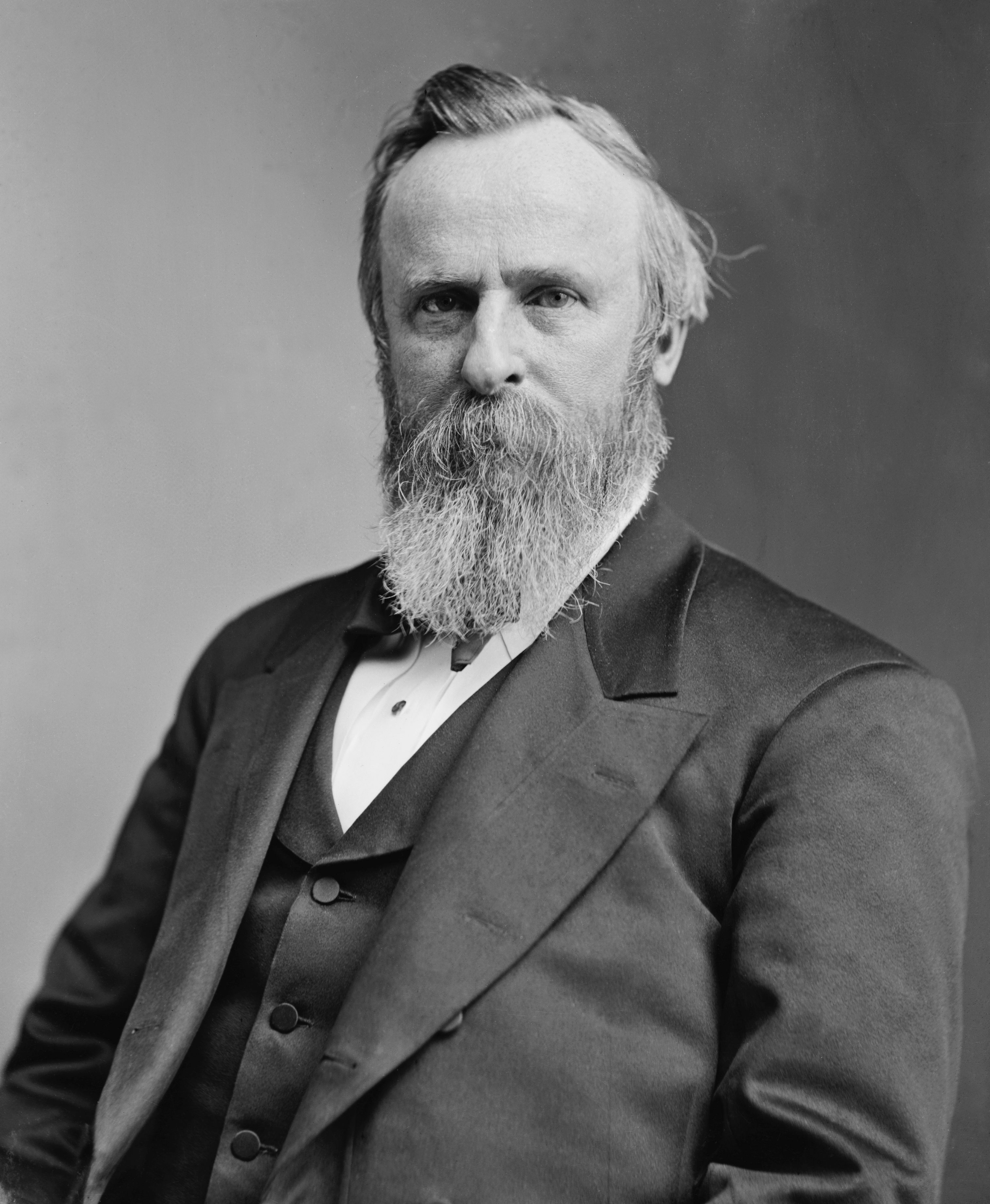
1 – 1870s

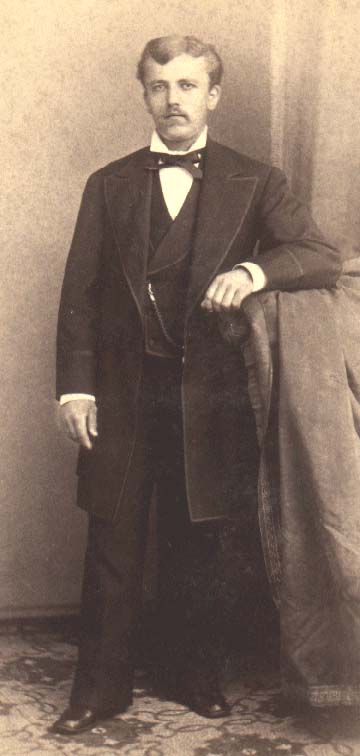
2 – 1870s

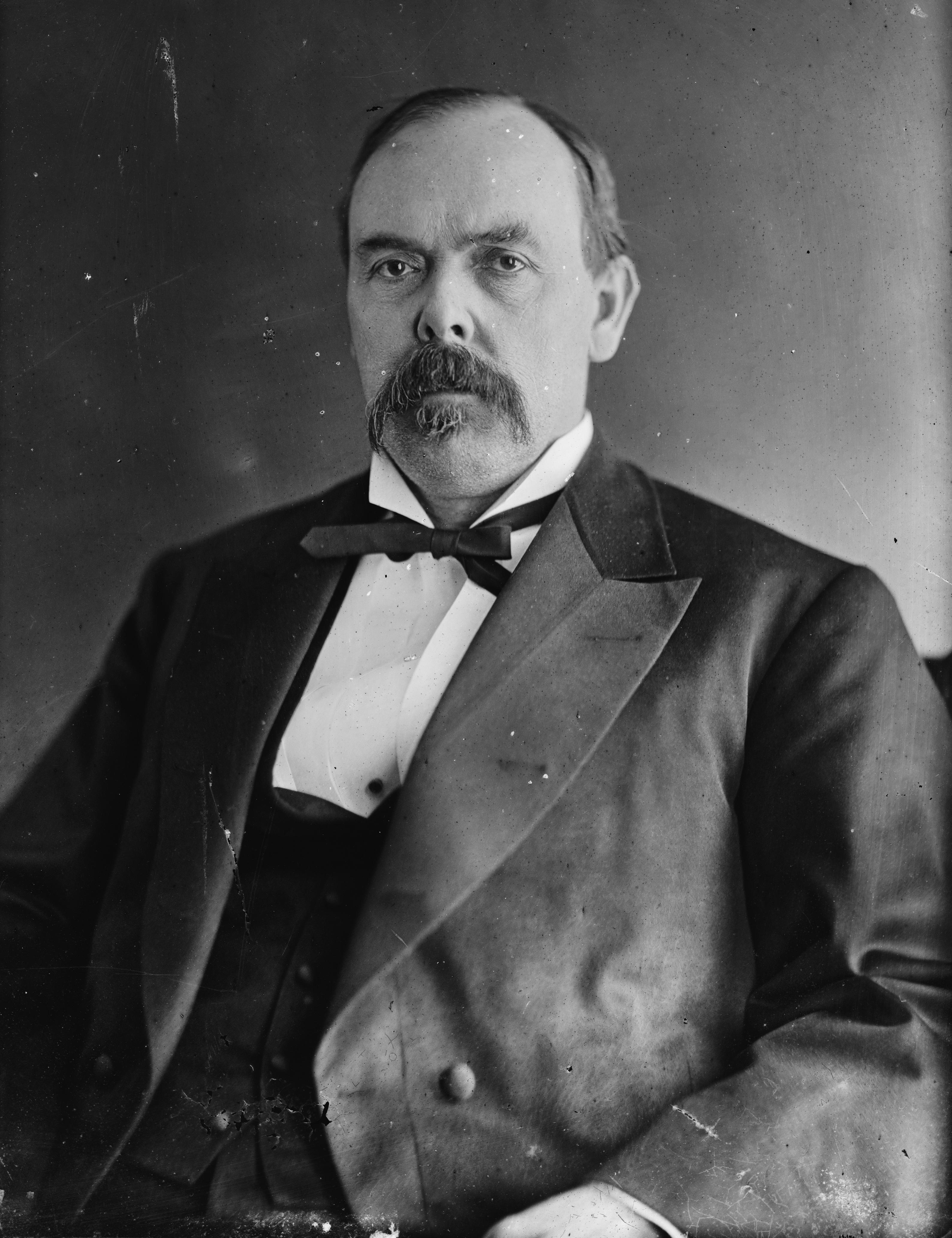
3 – 1870s

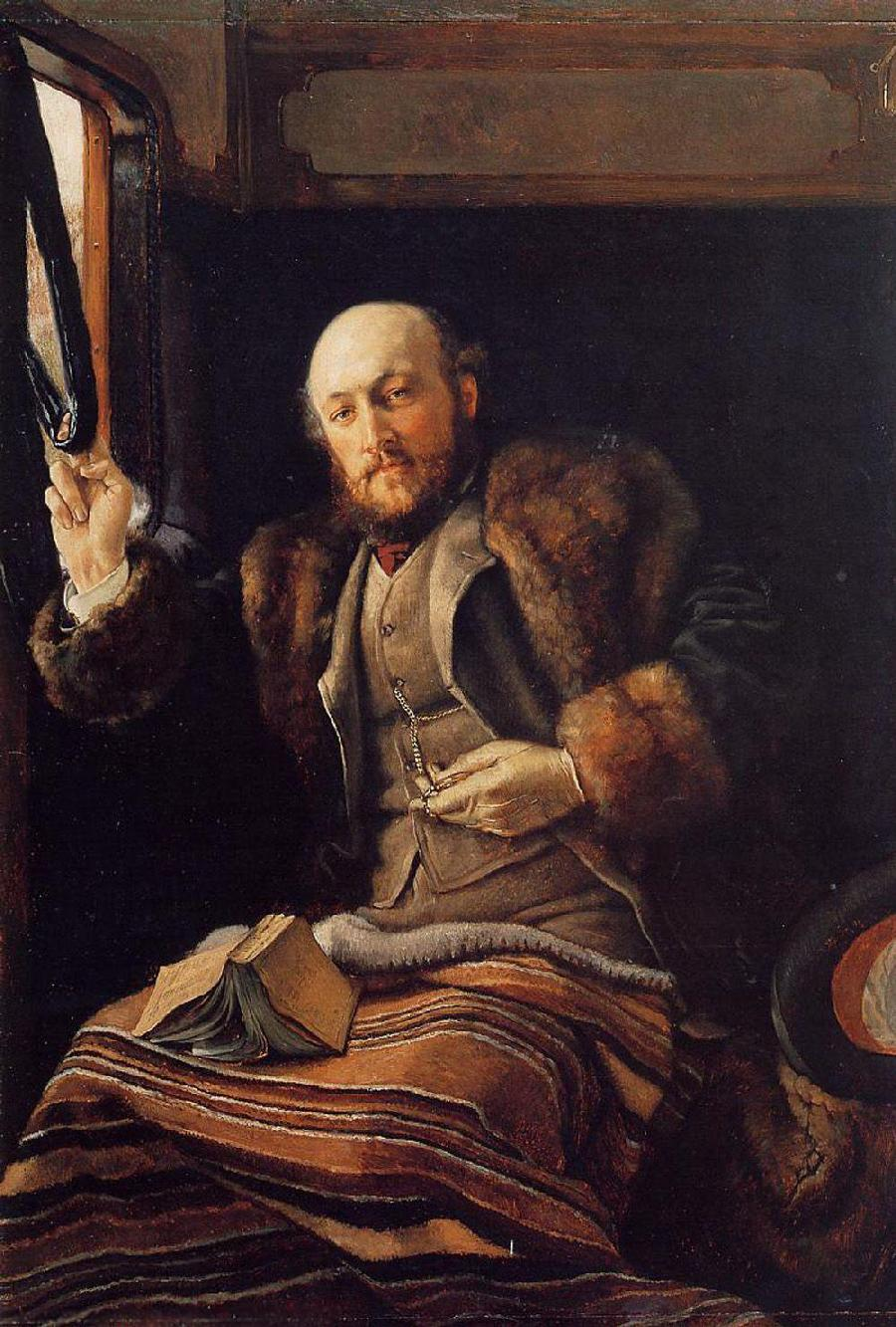
4 – 1872

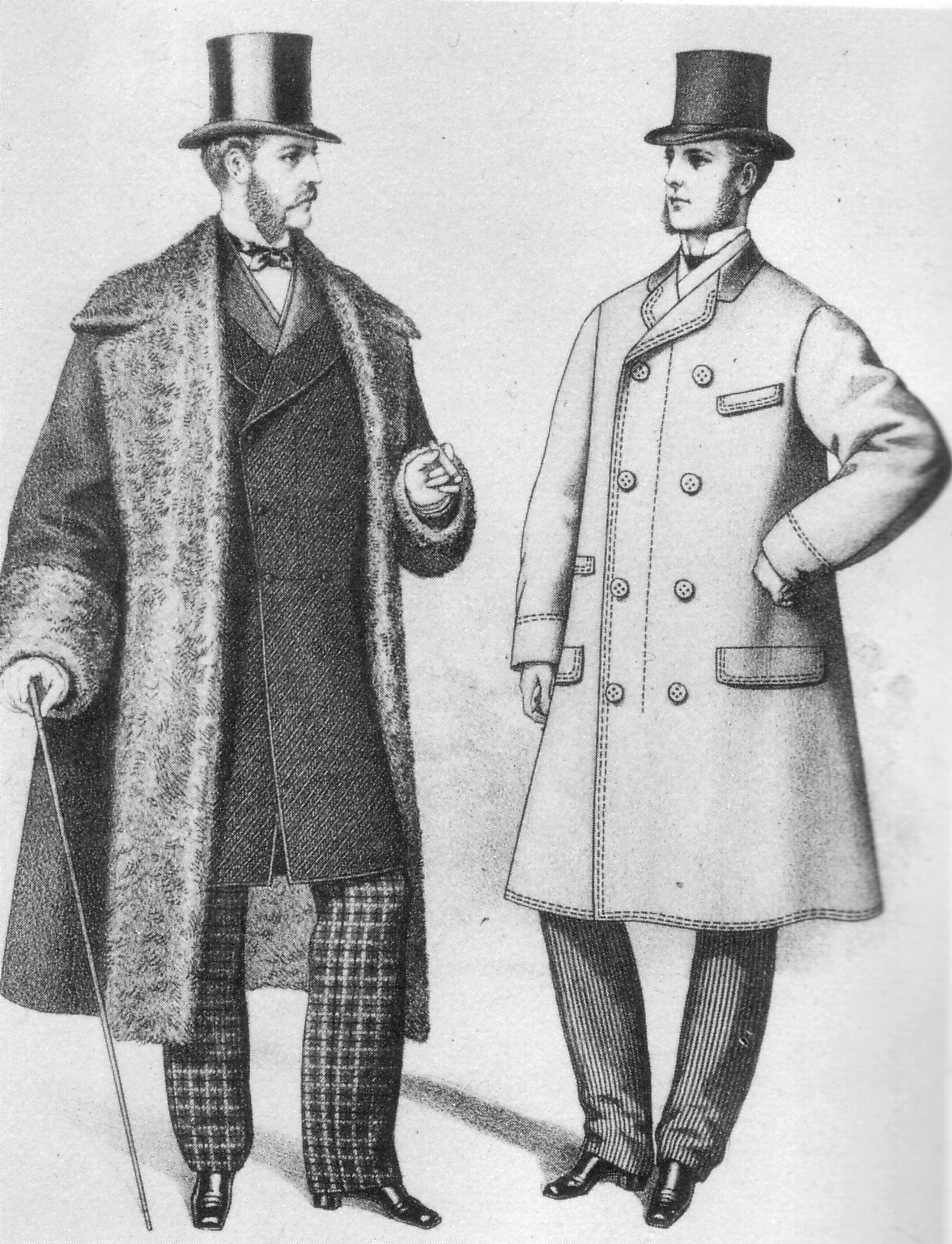
5 – 1872

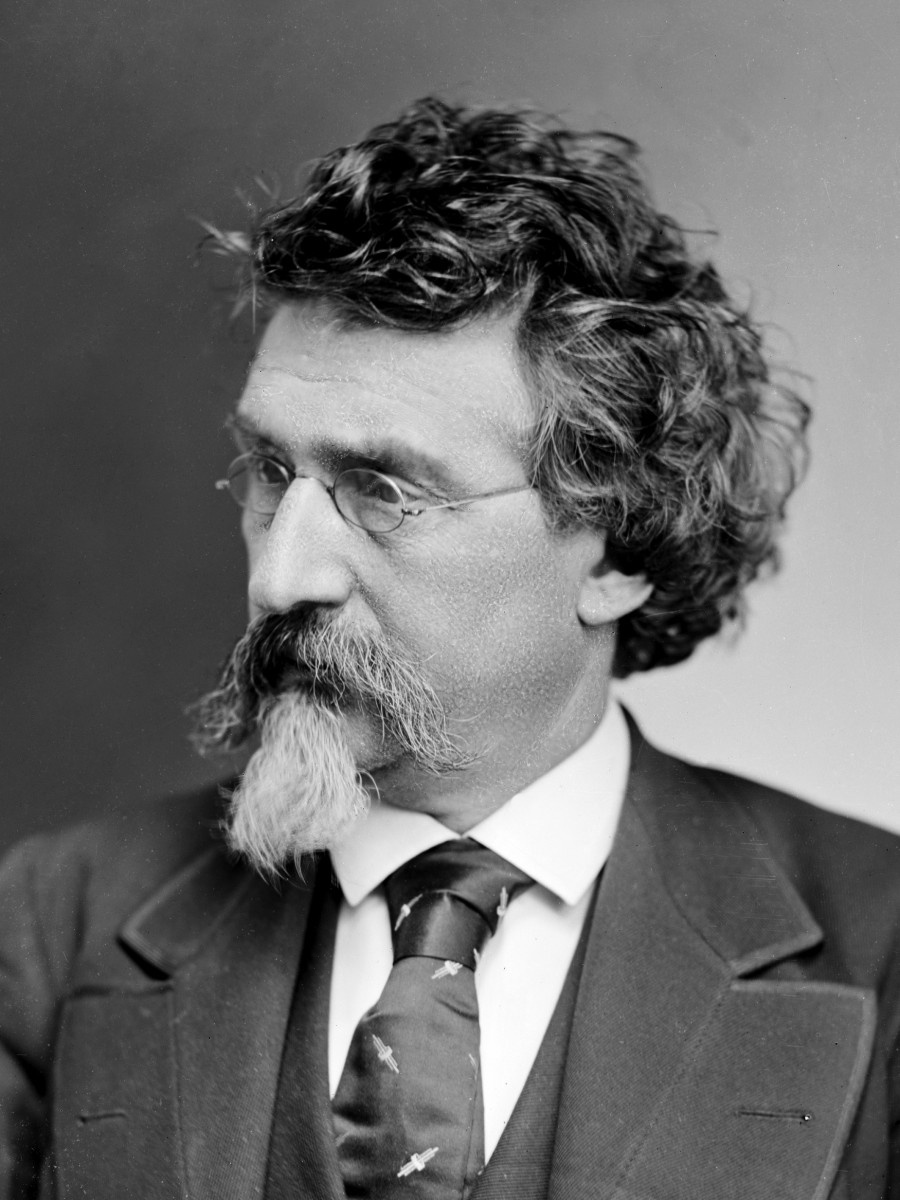
6 – 1875
1. 1870s photo of President Rutherford B. Hayes. His coat and shawl-collared vest or waistcoat have covered buttons. Note functional buttonholes all the way up his coat lapel.
2. Three-piece suit with frock coat, 1870s.
3. Oliver P. Morton wears a narrow string tie, 1870s.
4. Gentleman in a railway carriage wears a dust-colored coat, trousers, and collar-less waistcoat with a dark red necktie. He wears a fur-lined overcoat and tan gloves. Britain, 1872.
5. Plate from The Gazette of Fashion shows a fur-lined overcoat (left) and double-breasted topcoat (right) with braid trim and decorative topstitching, 1872. Checked trousers were quite fashionable.
6. Photographer Mathew Brady wears a coat with braid trim on the collar and lapels over a matching waistcoat. His turned-down collar is worn over a four-in-hand necktie. 1875.

=== Style gallery 1875–1879 ===
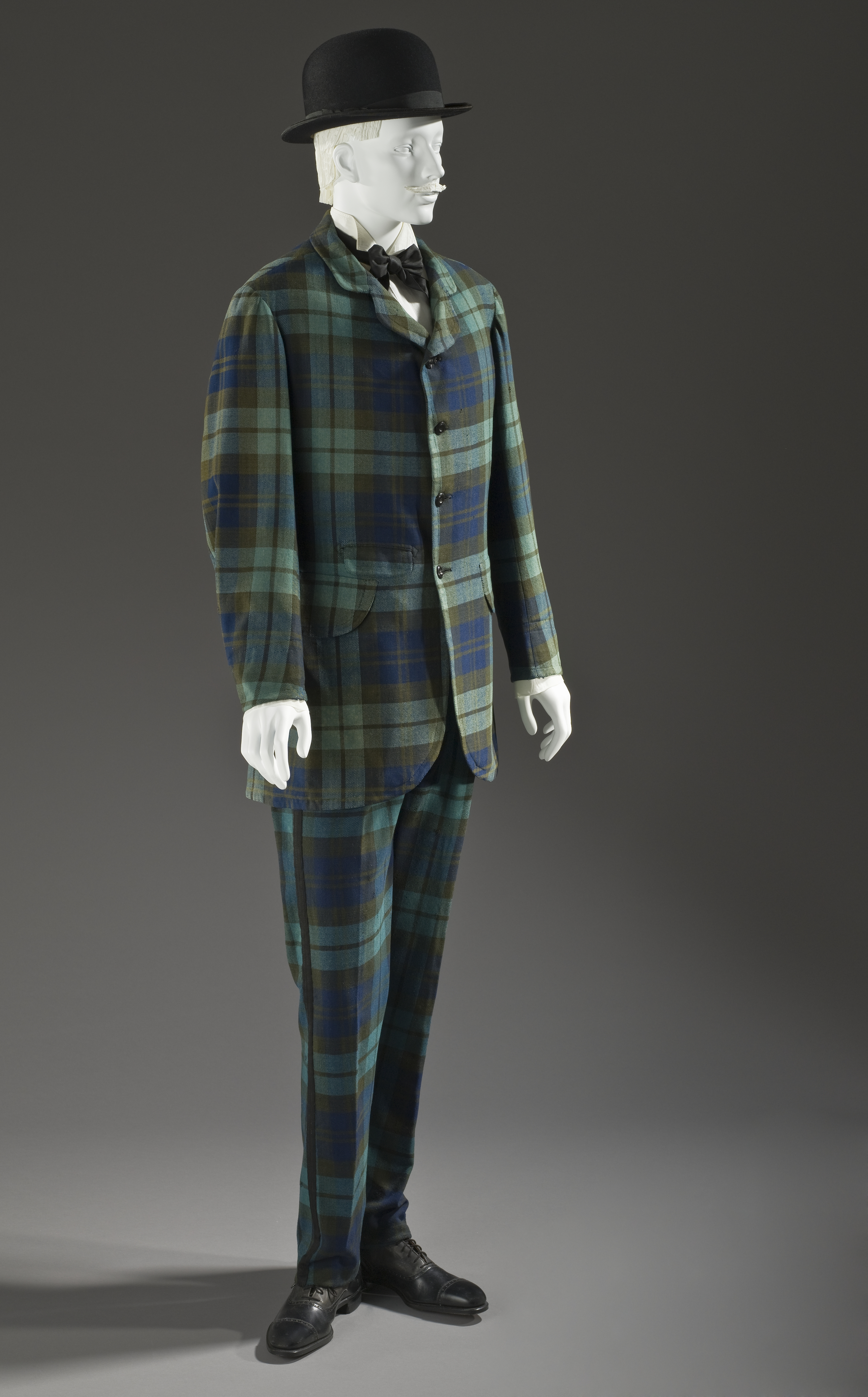
1 - 1875–1880

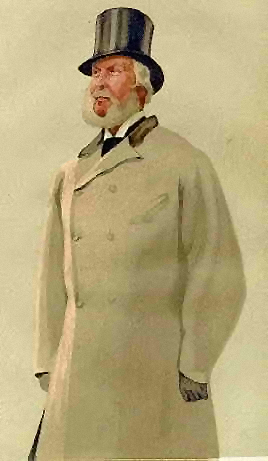
2 – 1876

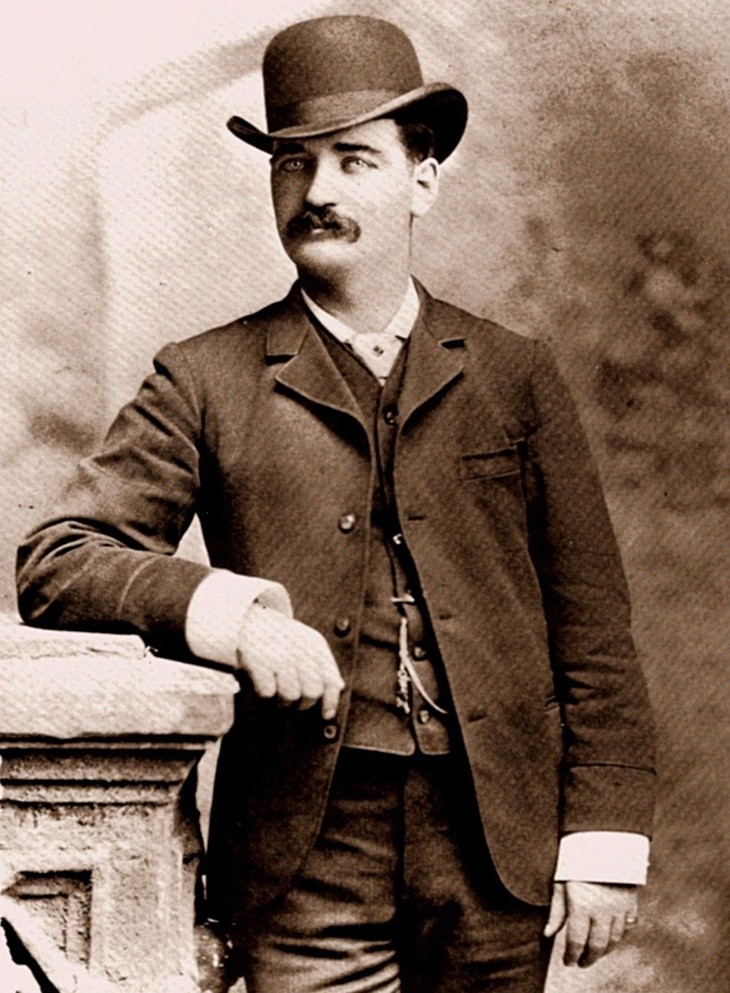
3 – 1879

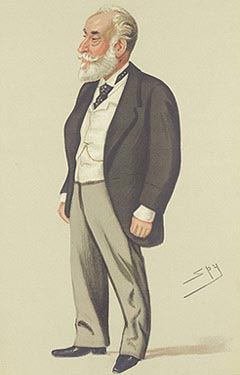
4 – 1879

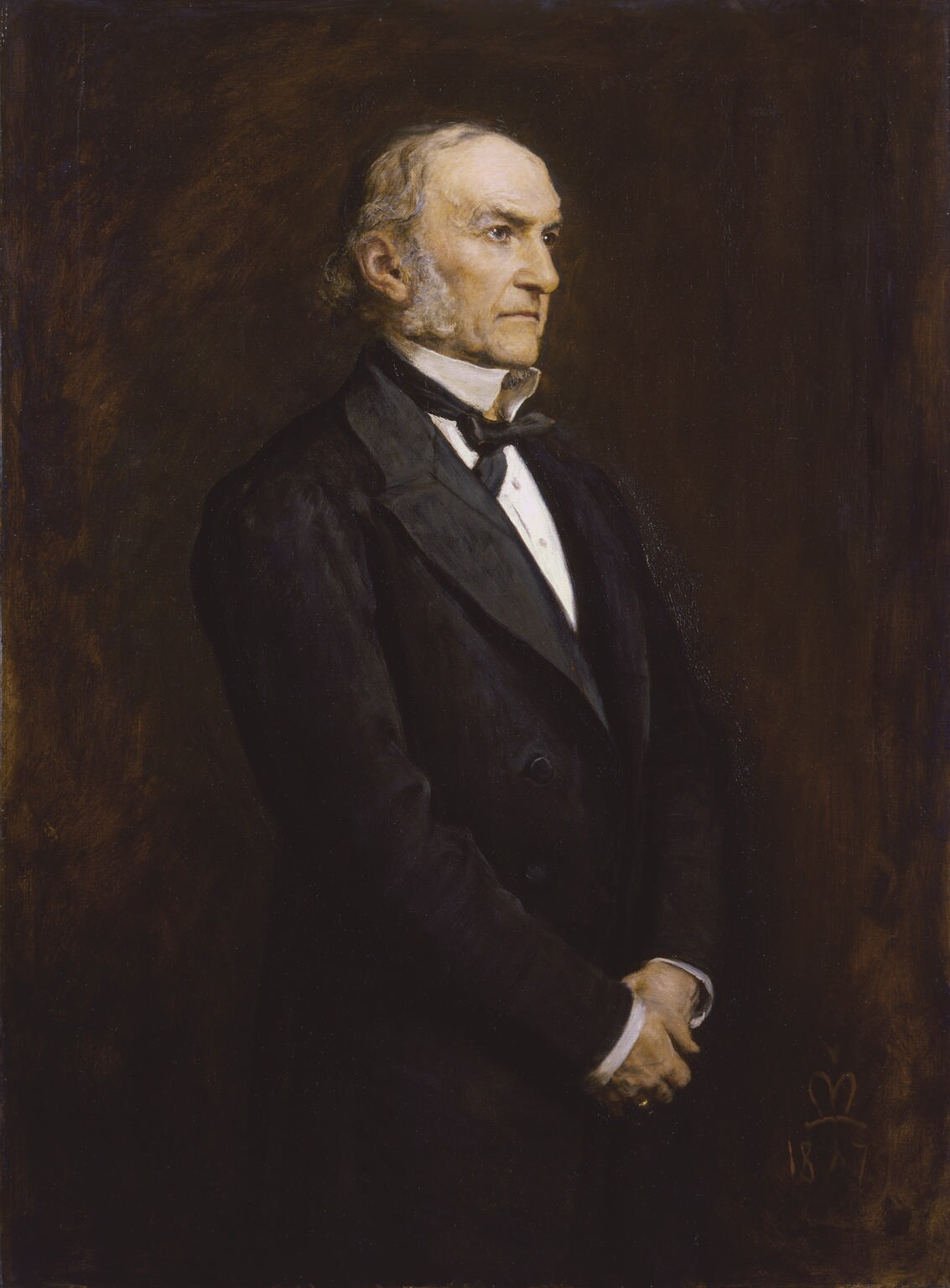
5 – 1879
1. Two-piece lounge suit of tartan wool twill buttons high in front. English lounge suits were typically worn with bowler hats. 1875–1880, England, Los Angeles County Museum of Art, M.2010.33.9a-b.
2. Major-General James Macdonald (British Army officer) is drawn by James Tissot in a slightly fitted, double-breasted topcoat with a diagonally positioned breast pocket and a contrasting collar. His shirt collar is pressed into flat wings and is worn with a wide, dark tie. He wears a top hat and gloves. 1876.
3. 1879 photo of American lawman Bat Masterson wearing a three-piece suit and a bowler hat. His cutaway sack coat has a high front closure and is worn buttoned only at the top, over a vest or waistcoat cut straight across at the waist and decorated with a prominent watch chain.
4. Vanity Fair sketch of 1879 shows Sir Albert Abdallah David Sassoon in "morning dress" (formal daywear): grey trousers, dark cutaway coat, white waistcoat, wing-collared shirt and dark tie.
5. William Gladstone wears conservative clothing; his tall collar is still upstanding, and he wears his tie in a bow knot. Portrait of William Ewart Gladstone by John Everett Millais, 1879.

=== Necktie gallery ===
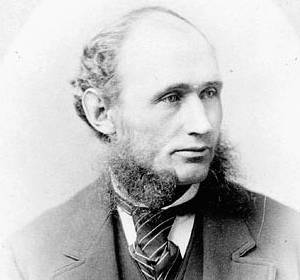

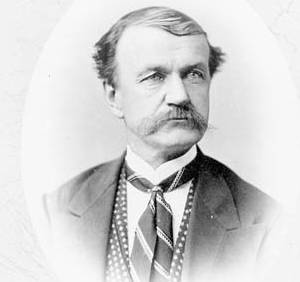

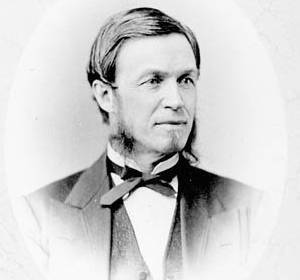

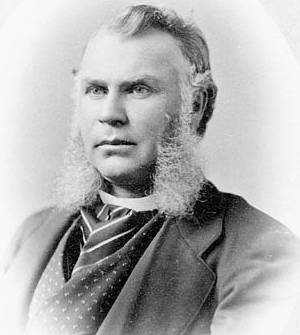

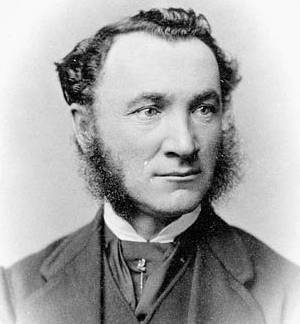

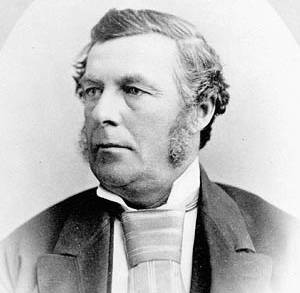

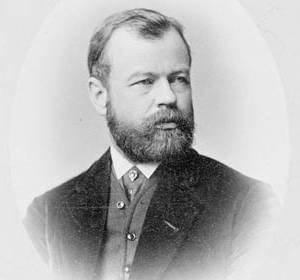

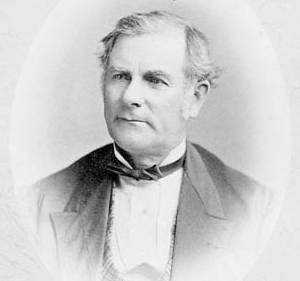

== Children's fashion ==
Infants continued to be dressed in flowing gowns, a style that continued into the early 20th century. Gender dress changes often did not occur until a child was five or six; however, in the later decades gender dress came much sooner. Girls' ages could be depicted often based on the length of their skirt. As the girls got older, they wore longer skirts. A four-year-old would wear her skirt slightly above knee length; ten to twelve at mid-knee; twelve to fifteen varied from below the knee to mid-calf; and by sixteen or seventeen, a girl's dress would be just above ankle length. The age of a boy could often be decided based on the length and type of trouser or how similar the attire was to that of a man's. Boys often dressed similar to adult males, as they too wore blazers and Norfolk jackets.

Much influence on the styles of children's dress came from artist Kate Greenaway, an illustrator of children's books. She strongly influenced styles of young girls' dress, as she often showed girls dressed in empire styles in her books. The idea of children's dress being taken from books is also found is styles such as the Little Lord Fauntleroy suit which was worn by the hero of a children's book published in 1885–86.

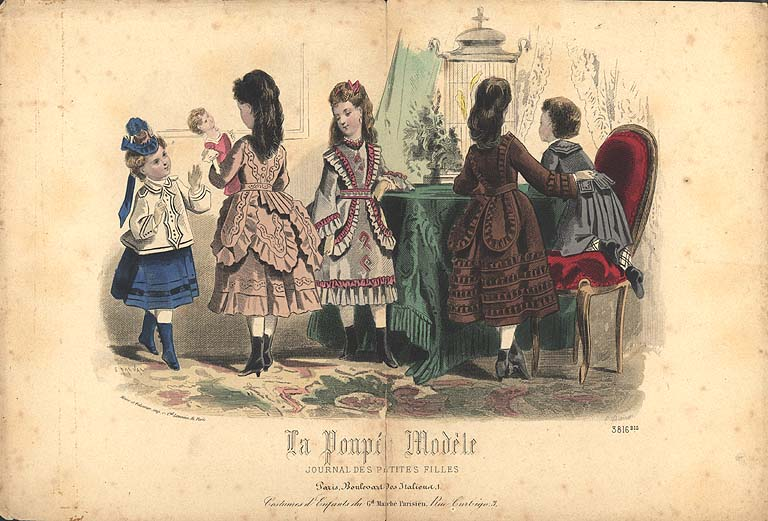
1870 fashion plate

Summer dress with sash, 1872–73

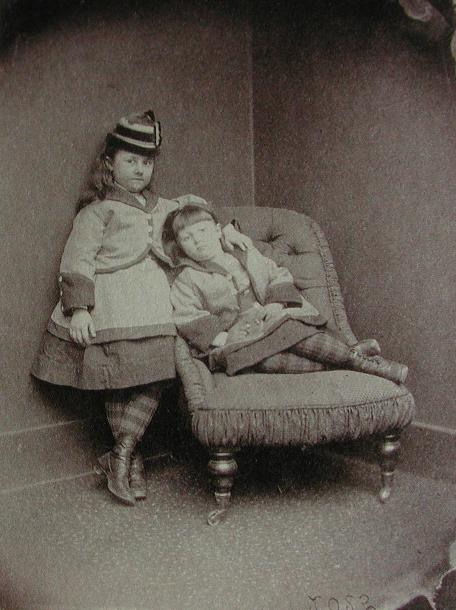
Sisters Beatrice and Ethel Hatch, 1874

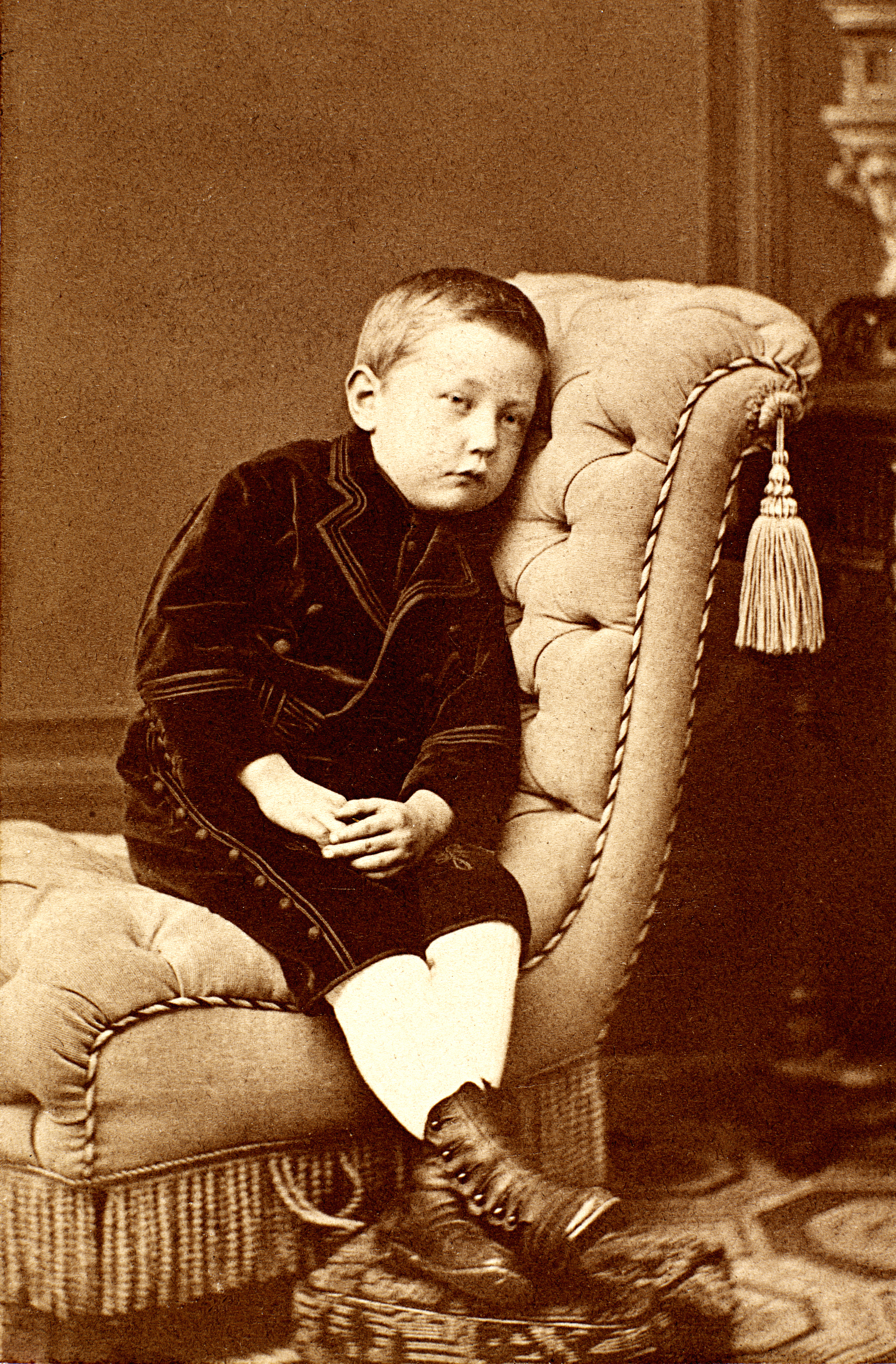
Young Roald Amundsen, c. 1875

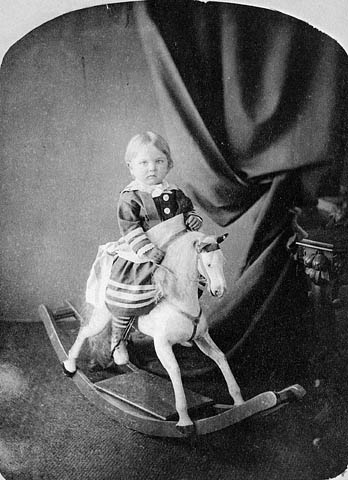
Two-year-old William Lyon Mackenzie King, c. 1876

== See also ==
- Victorian fashion
- Corset controversy
- Dolly Varden (costume)
- Artistic Dress movement
