= Bathing dress =

19th-century women's swimwear

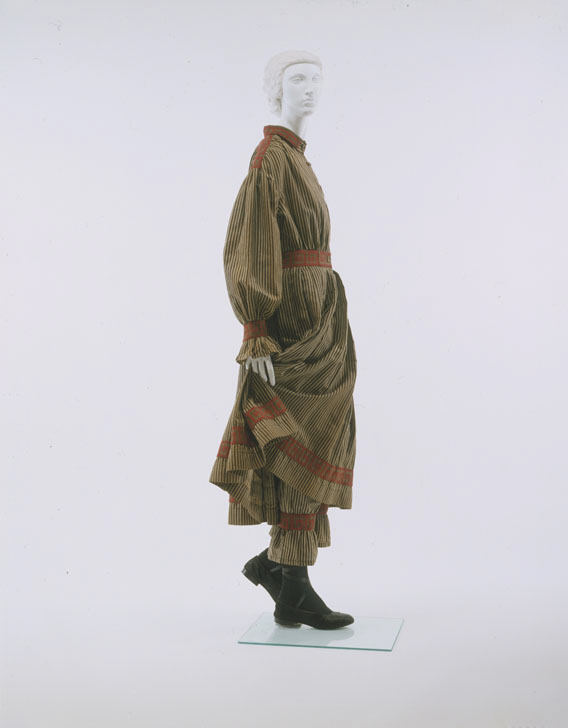
1870s American bathing dress

A bathing dress was a mode of dress used for ladies' swimming/bathing activities during the 19th century. These bathing costumes originally included ankle length dresses, long pants, and long sleeves. Around the 1880s the sleeves and hemlines of these dresses were shortened to improve range of motion and general comfort.

== Uses and development ==
As the 19th century progressed, women's "bathing" or swimming activities became increasingly popular. The use of the bathing machine provided greater privacy to bathers and reduced the need for complete modesty. Athletic activities such as swimming and bicycling became more socially acceptable, resulting in a need for a better range of motion and a reduction in the weight of the garment when wet.

The bathing dress was popularly used up through the 1910s, eventually giving way to what we commonly see today as a swimsuit, being closest to what we know as a one piece swimsuit.

== Gallery ==
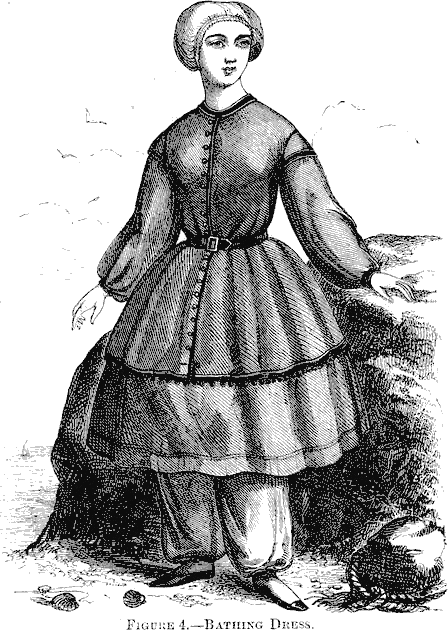
A mid-19th Century Bathing Dress

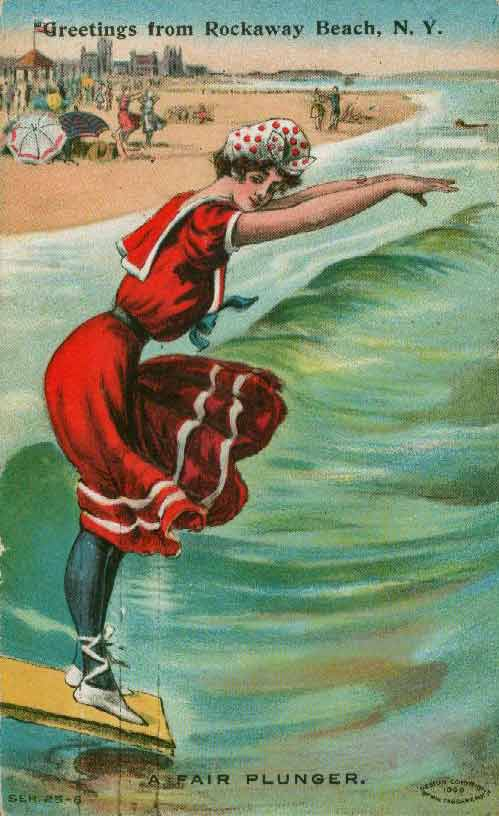
A lady bather wears a 1910 Bathing Dress

== See also ==
- Burqini
- Swimming dress
