= 1880s in Western fashion =

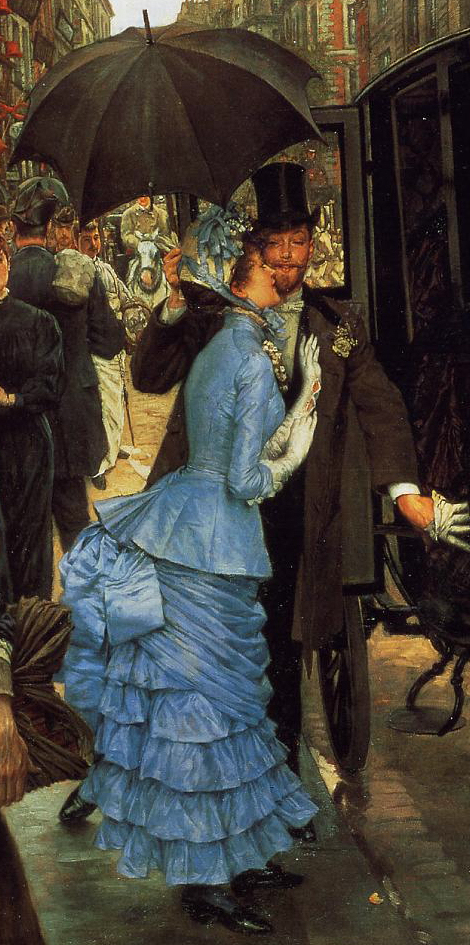
The Bridesmaid by James Tissot. Paris fashion, 1883–1885

1880s fashion in Western and Western-influenced countries is characterized by the return of the bustle. The long, lean line of the late 1870s was replaced by a full, curvy silhouette with gradually widening shoulders. Fashionable waists were low and tiny below a full, low bust supported by a corset. The Rational Dress Society was founded in 1881 in reaction to the extremes of fashionable corsetry.

== Women's fashion ==
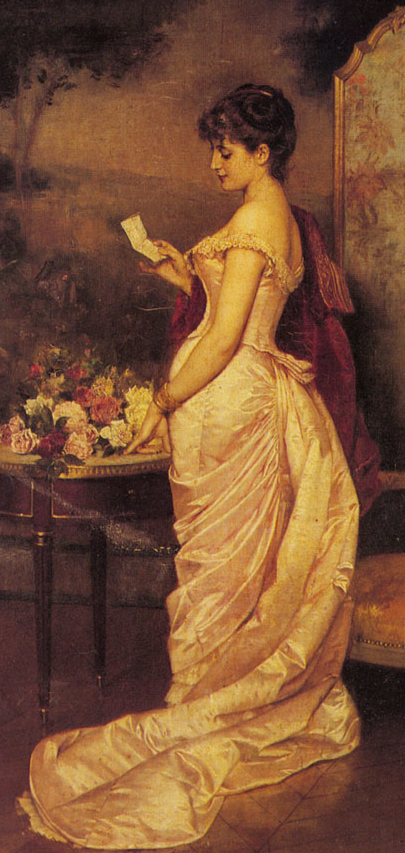
The fashionable corseted figure of 1883. Hair is swept up to the top of the head, and the front hair is frizzled over the forehead.

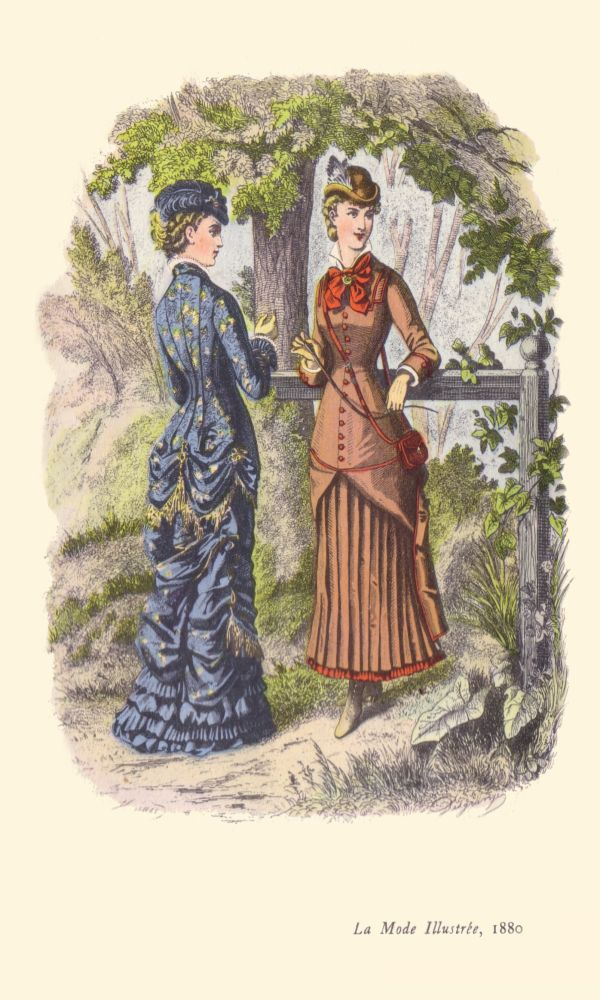
Princess-line walking dress (left) and hunting costume (right) from La Mode Illustrée, 1880.

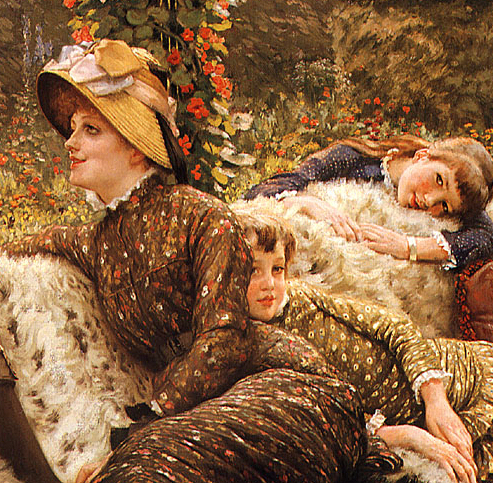
Summer dresses of 1882 show Aesthetic influence in the small-scale floral prints. The straw hat frames the fashionable frizzled hair.

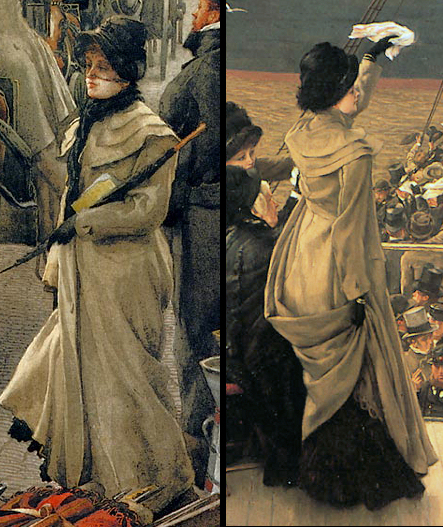
Front and back views of a traveling coat, c. 1880–81

=== Overview ===
As in the previous decade, emphasis remained on the back of the skirt, with fullness gradually rising from behind the knees to just below the waist. The fullness in back was balanced by a fuller, lower chest, achieved by rigid corseting, creating an S-shaped silhouette, foreshadowing the more radical form of this shape that would become popular in the early 1900s. These gowns typically did not have a long train in the back, which was different from the gowns worn in the 1870s, and were extremely tight. They were known as the "hobble-skirt" due to the tightness of them. Winter gowns were made in darker hues whereas summer ones were made in lighter colors. Velvet was also a very popular fabric used during this period.

Skirts were looped, draped, or tied up in various ways, and worn over matching or contrasting colored underskirts. The polonaise was a revival style based on a fashion of the 1780s, with a fitted, cutaway overdress caught up and draped over an underskirt. Long, jacket-like fitted bodices called basques were also popular for clothing during the day.

Gowns were sleeveless and low-necked (except for matrons), and were worn with long over the elbow or shoulder length gloves of fine kidskin or suede.

Choker necklaces and jewelled collars were fashionable under the influence of Alexandra, Princess of Wales, who wore this fashion to disguise a scar on her neck.

=== Underwear ===
The bustle returned to fashion and reached its greatest proportions c. 1886–1888, extending almost straight out from the back waist to support a profusion of drapery, frills, swags, and ribbons. The fashionable corset created a low, full bust with little separation of the breasts.

A usual type of undergarment was called combinations, a camisole with attached knee- or calf-length drawers, worn under the corset, bustle, and petticoat. Woolen combinations were recommended for health, especially when engaging in fashionable sports.

=== Outerwear ===
Riding habits had become a "uniform" of matching jacket and skirt worn with a high-collared shirt or chemisette, with a top hat and veil. They were worn without bustles, but the cut of the jacket followed the silhouette of the day.

In contrast, hunting costumes were far more fashionably styled, with draped ankle-length skirts worn with boots or gaiters.

Tailored costumes consisting of a long jacket and skirt were worn for travel or walking; these were worn with the bustle and a small hat or bonnet. Travelers wore long coats like dusters to protect their clothes from dirt, rain, and soot.

=== Artistic dress ===
Artistic dress remained an undercurrent in Bohemian circles throughout the 1880s. In reaction to the heavy drapery and rigid corseting of mainstream Paris fashion, aesthetic dress focused on beautiful fabrics made up simply, sometimes loosely fitted or with a belt at the waist. Aesthetic ideas influenced the tea gown, a frothy confection increasingly worn in the home, even to receive visitors.

=== Hairstyles and headgear ===
Hair was usually pulled back at the sides and worn in a low knot or cluster of ringlets; later hair was swept up to the top of the head. Fringe or bangs remained fashionable throughout the decade, usually curled or frizzled over the forehead, often called "Josephine Curls."

Bonnets resembled hats except for their ribbons tied under the chin; both had curvy brims. Sometimes people wore ribbons too.

=== Style gallery 1880–1883 ===
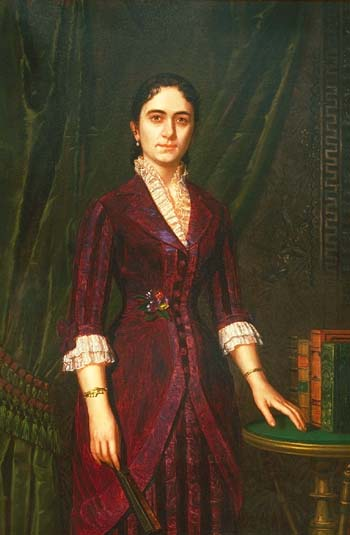
1 – 1880

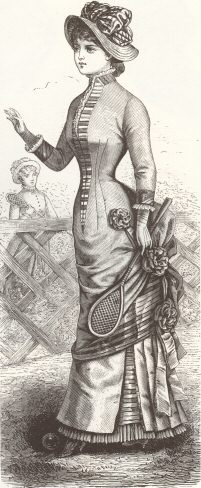
2 – 1881

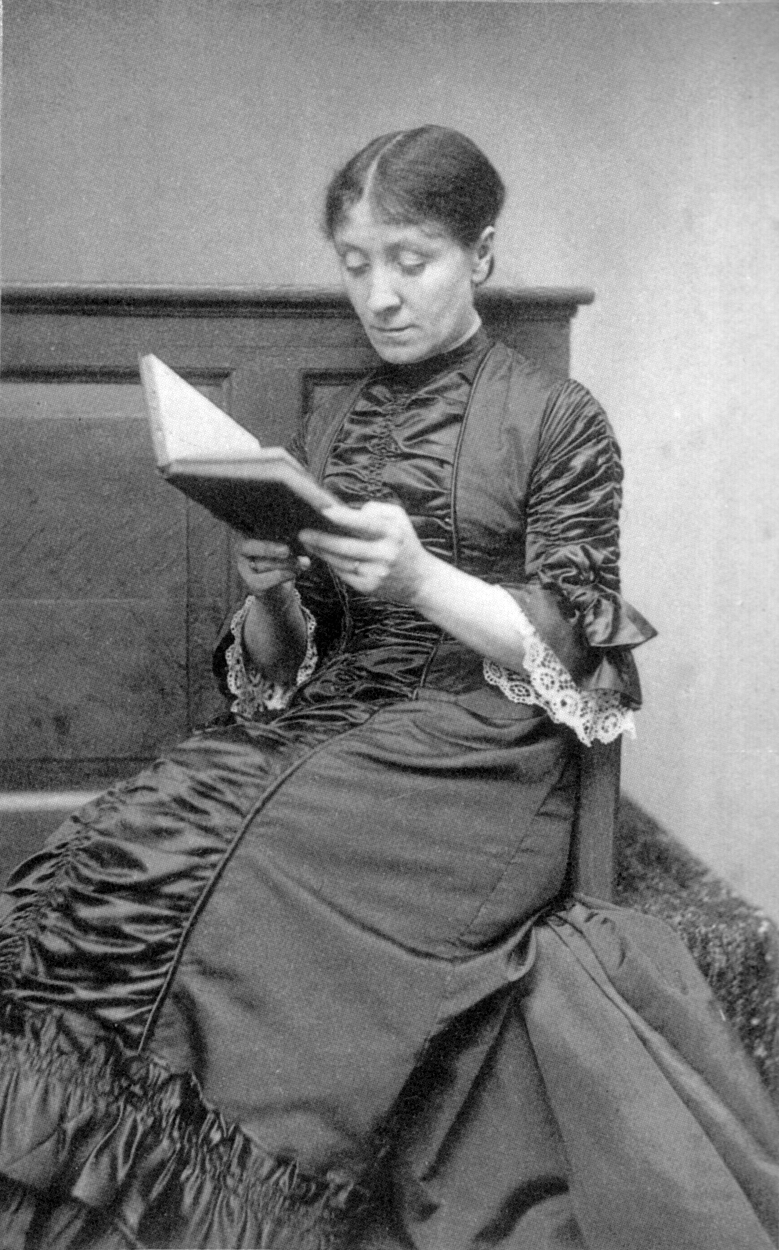
3 – c. 1882

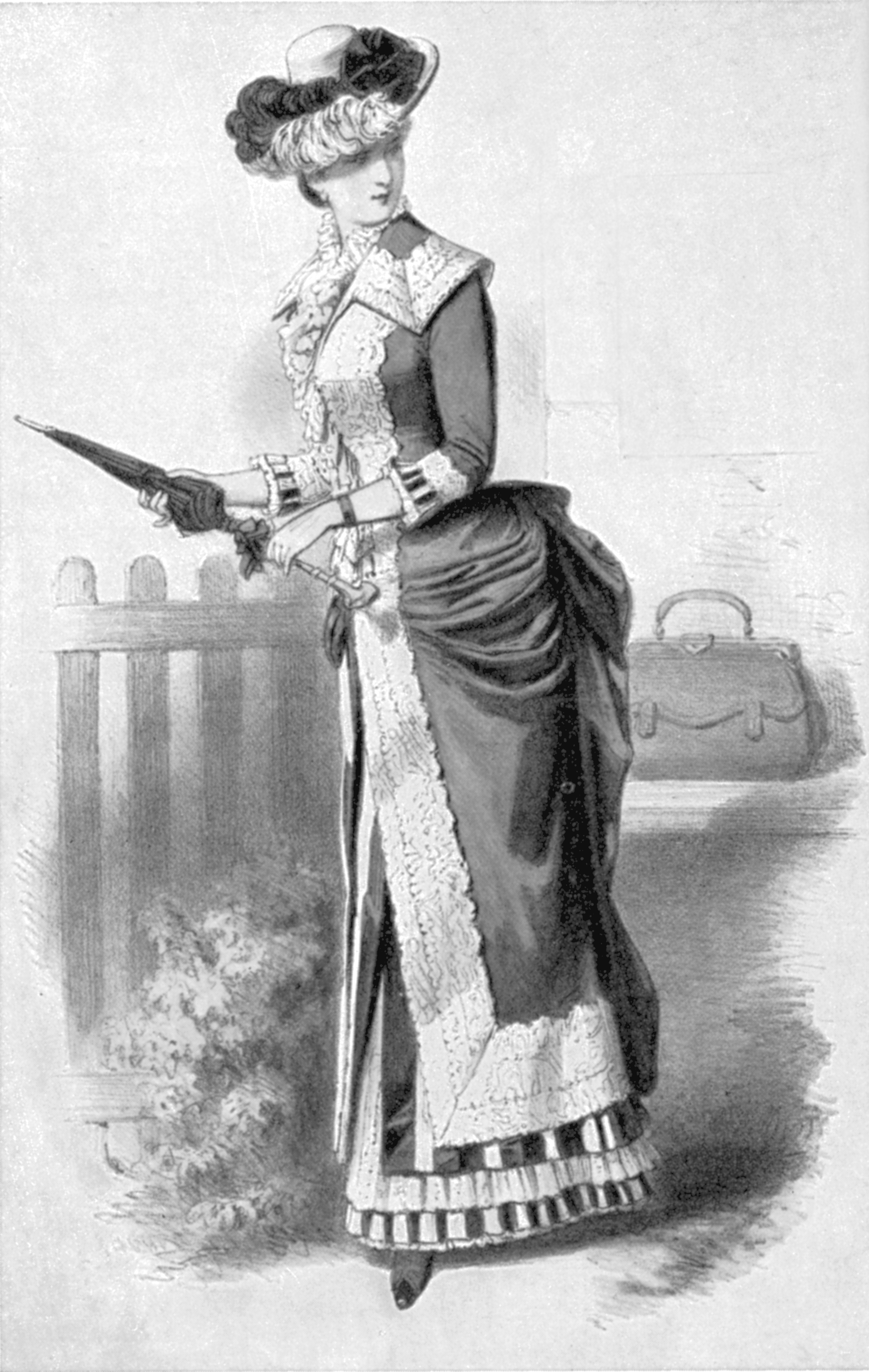
4 – 1882

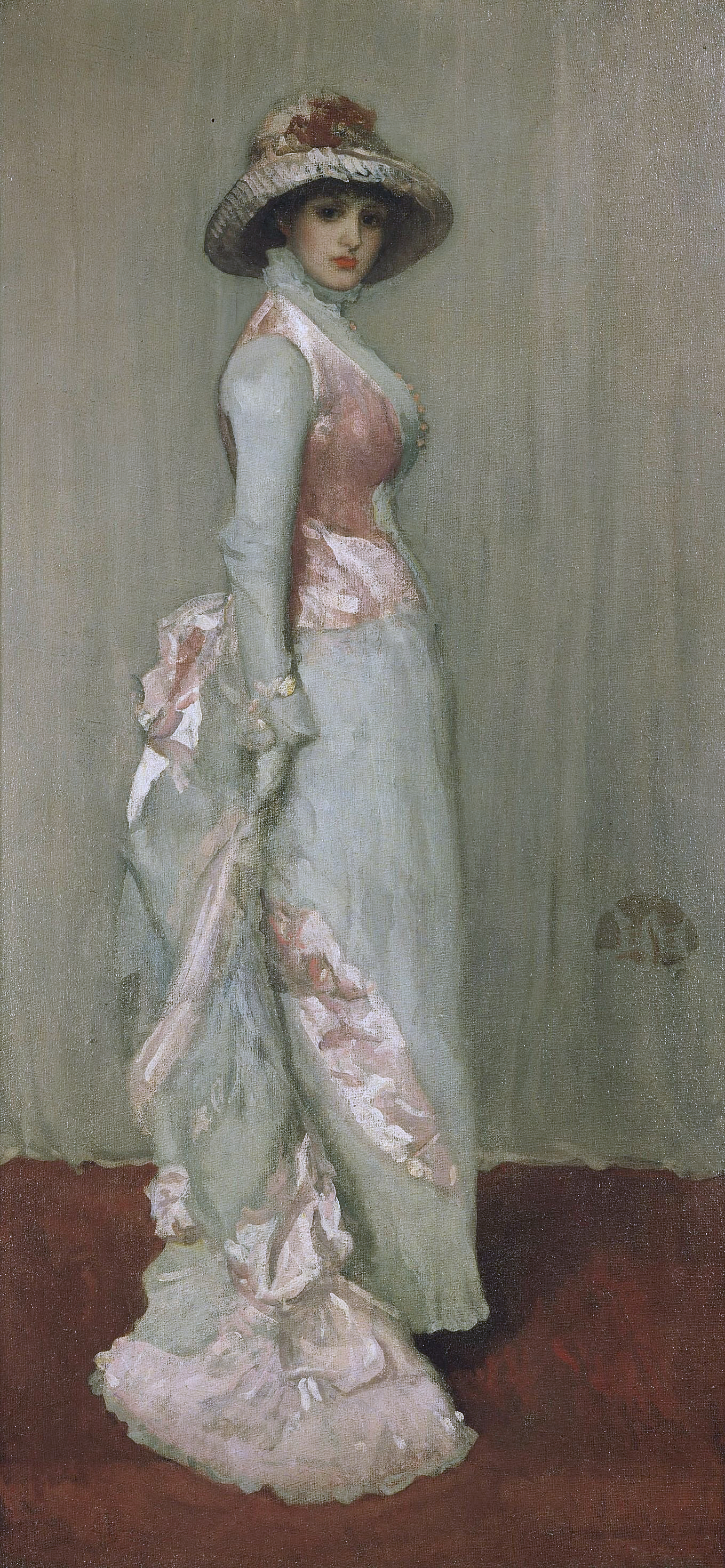
5 – 1882

6 – 1883

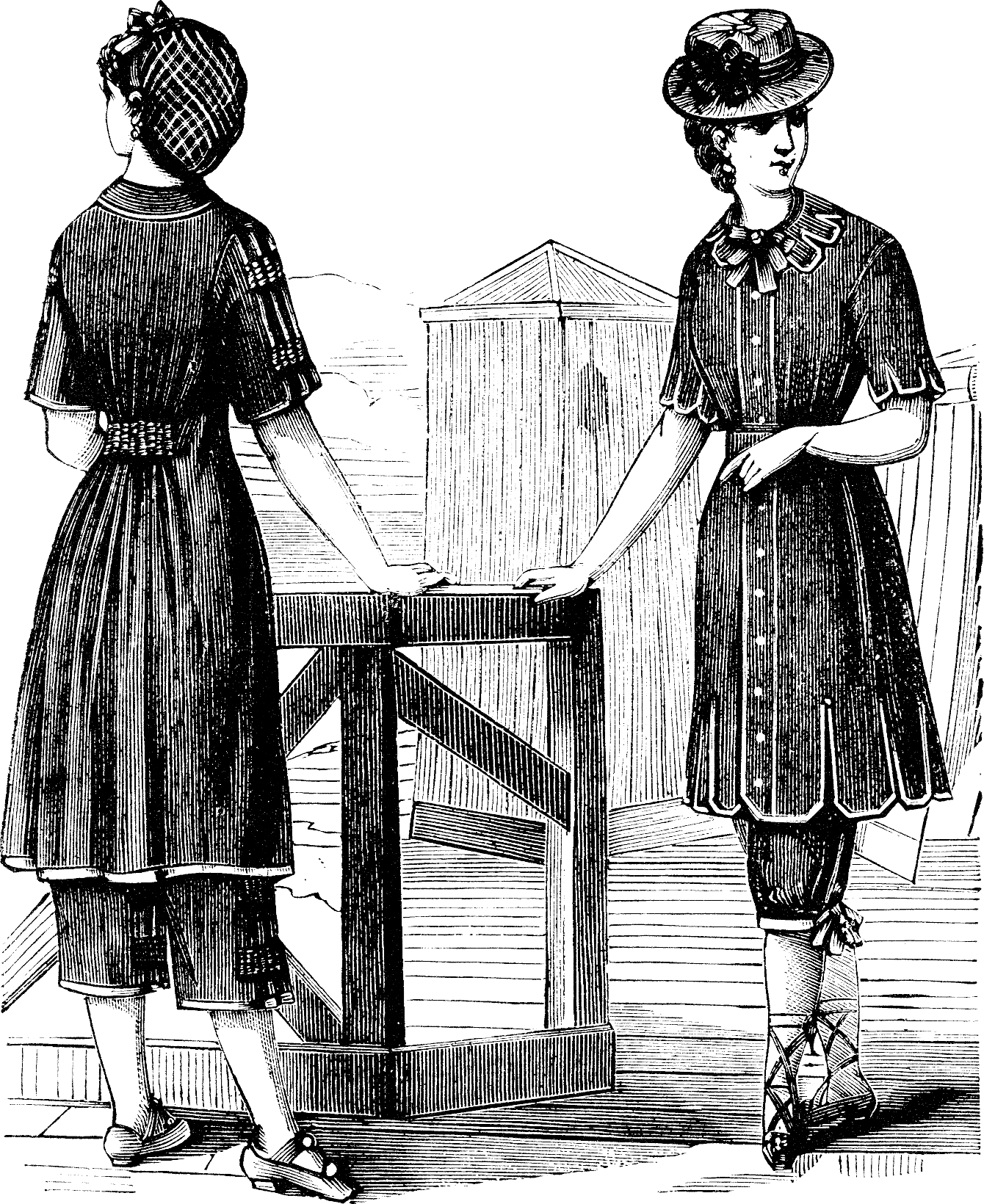
7 – 1883
1. Leona Barel of New Orleans wears a long, fitted jacket with three-quarter-length striped sleeves over a matching striped skirt. A nosegay of flowers is pinned at her waist, c. 1880.
2. Tennis costume.
3. Georgiana Burne-Jones wears a princess-line gown trimmed with ruched panels and ruffles, c. 1882
4. August 1882 fashion plate shows the return of the bustle: the tight overdress is looped up behind.
5. Whistler's Portrait of Lady Meux (1881–1882) shows the fashionable full bosom.
6. Misses' Polonaise has fitted bodice with a low point in front. The front of the skirt is cutaway and the back is looped up after the fashion of the 1780s. It is shown over a gored skirt with ruffles. Throughout the century, younger teenage girls ("misses" in fashion plates) wore their skirts just above their ankles.
7. Bathing dresses of 1883 show fashionable rear fullness.

=== Style gallery 1884–1889 ===
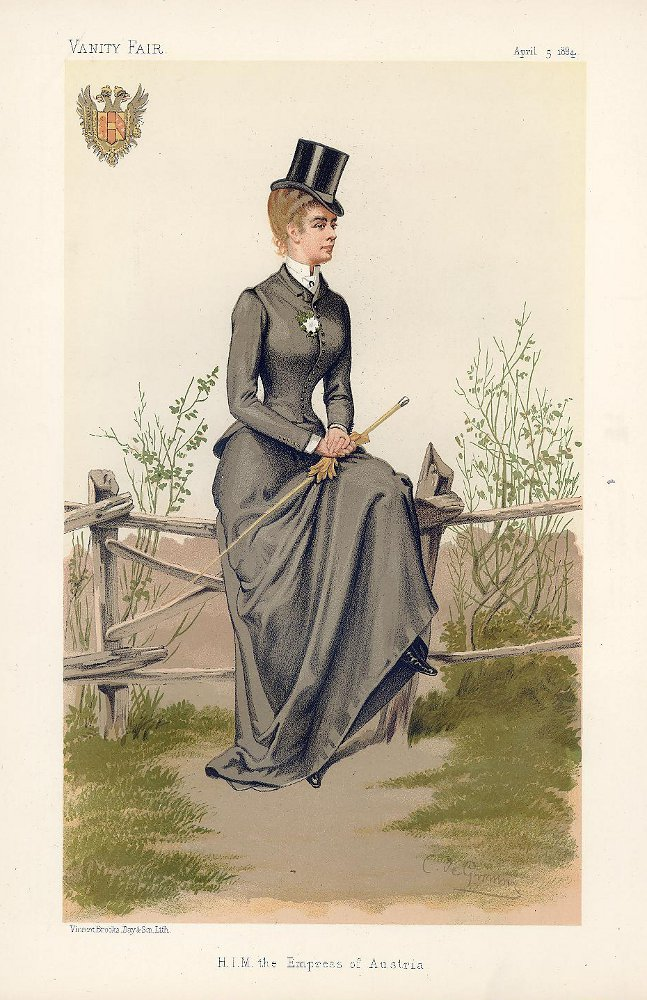
1 – 1884

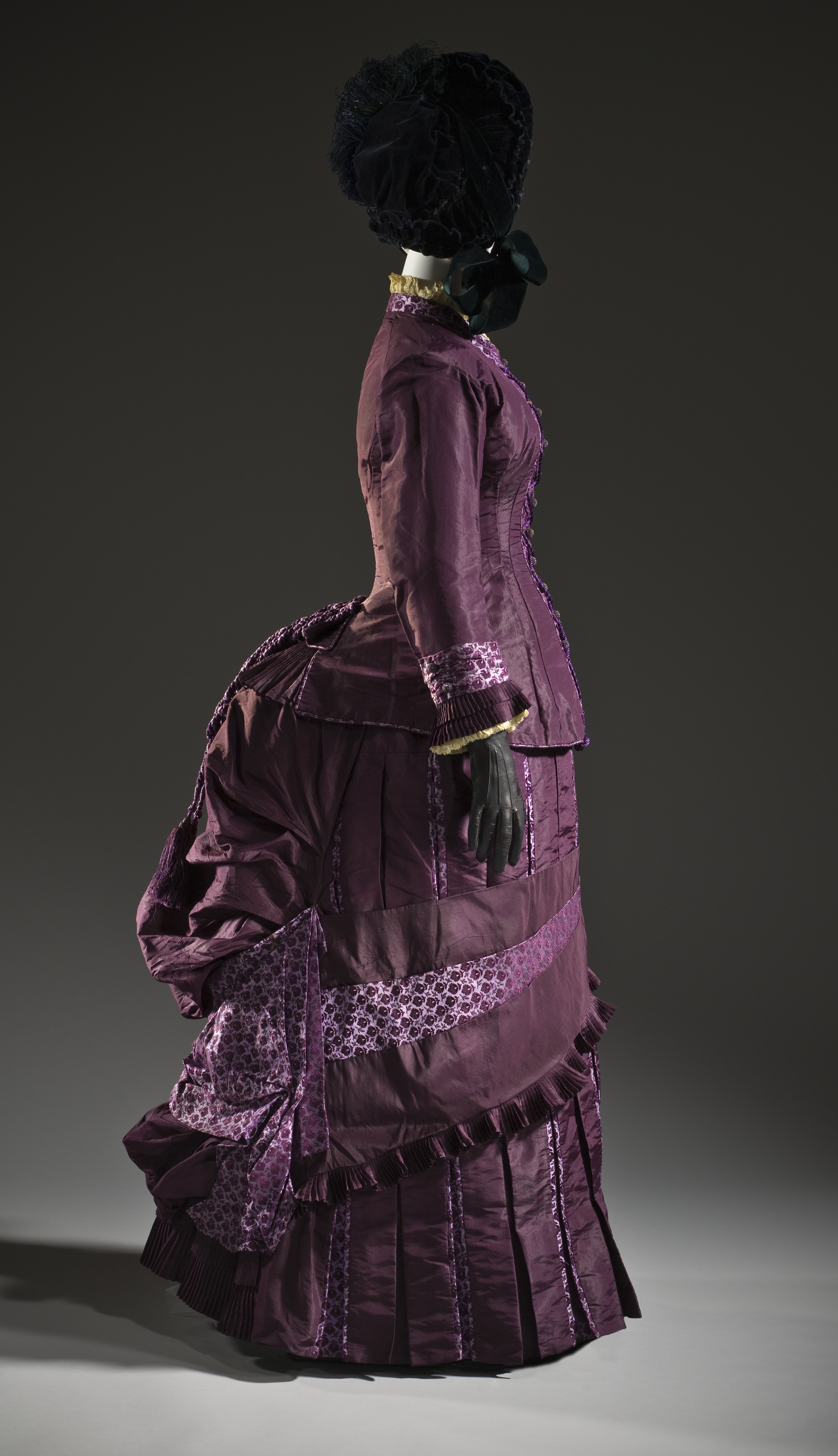
2 – 1885

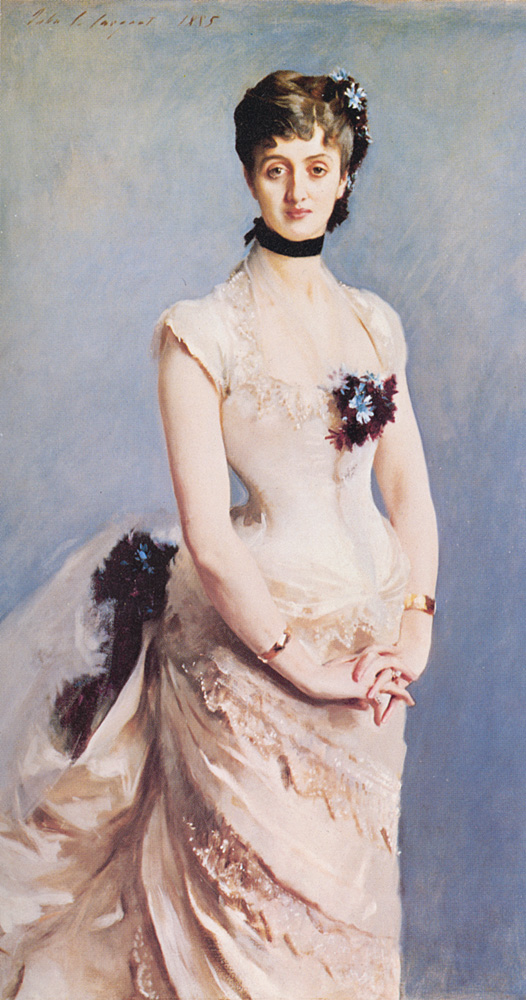
3 – 1885

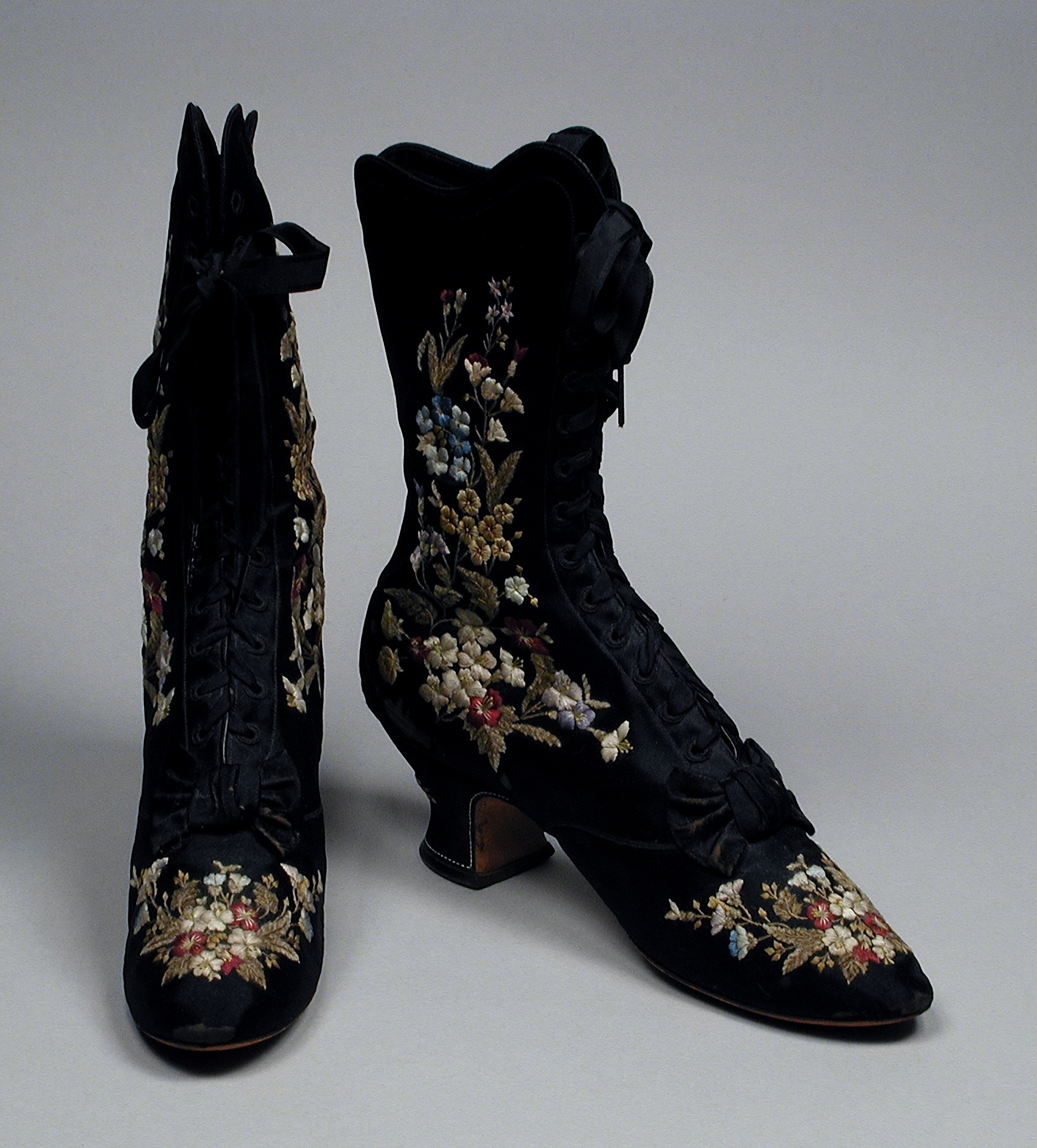
4 - c. 1885

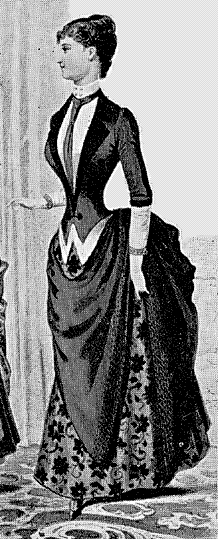
5 – 1886

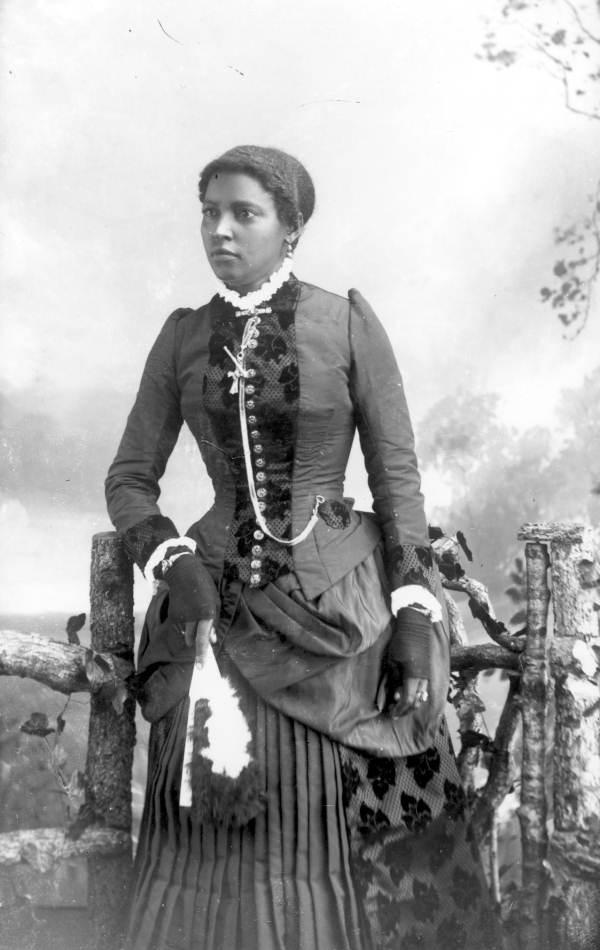
6 — c. 1886

7 – 1887

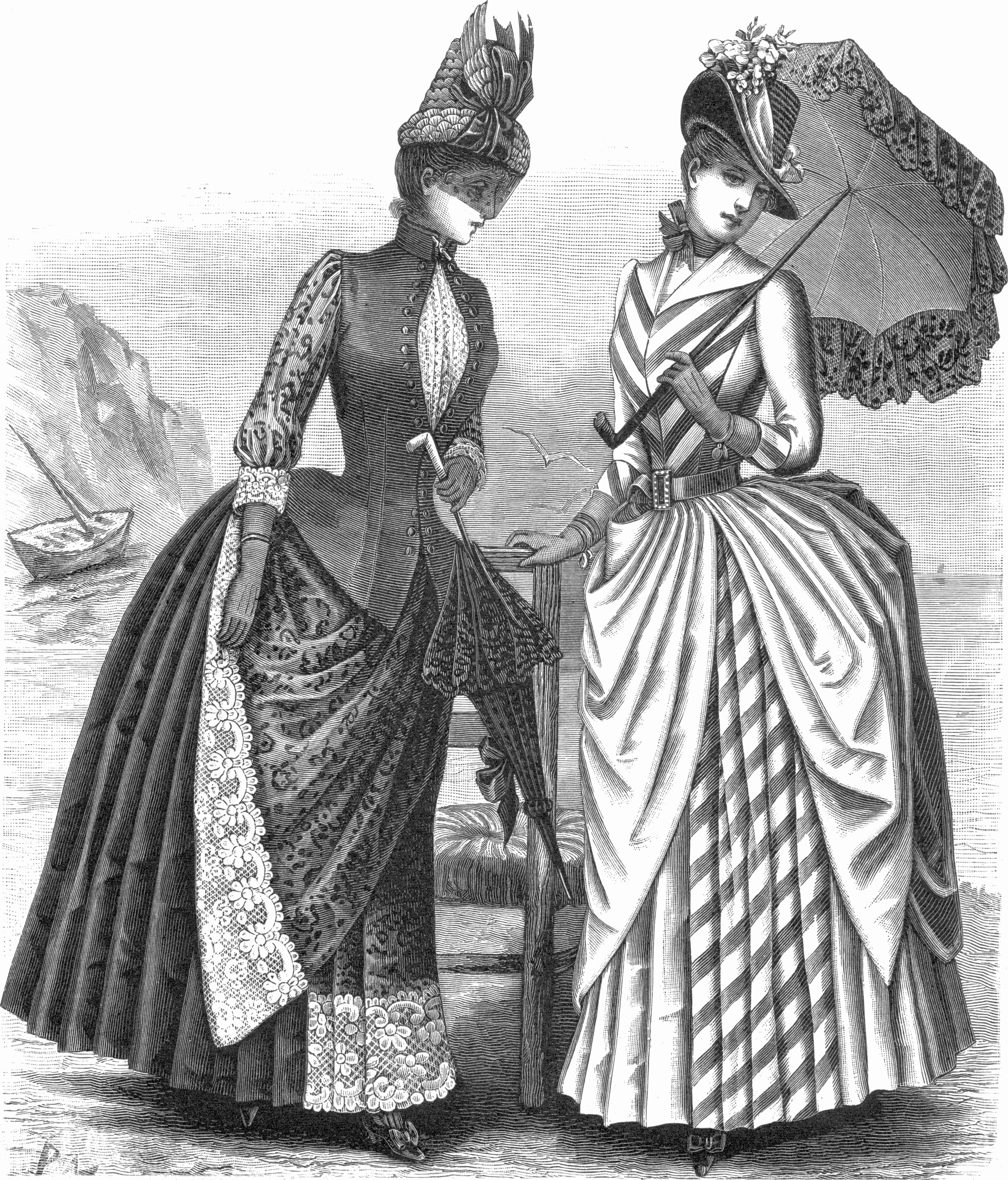
8 – 1887

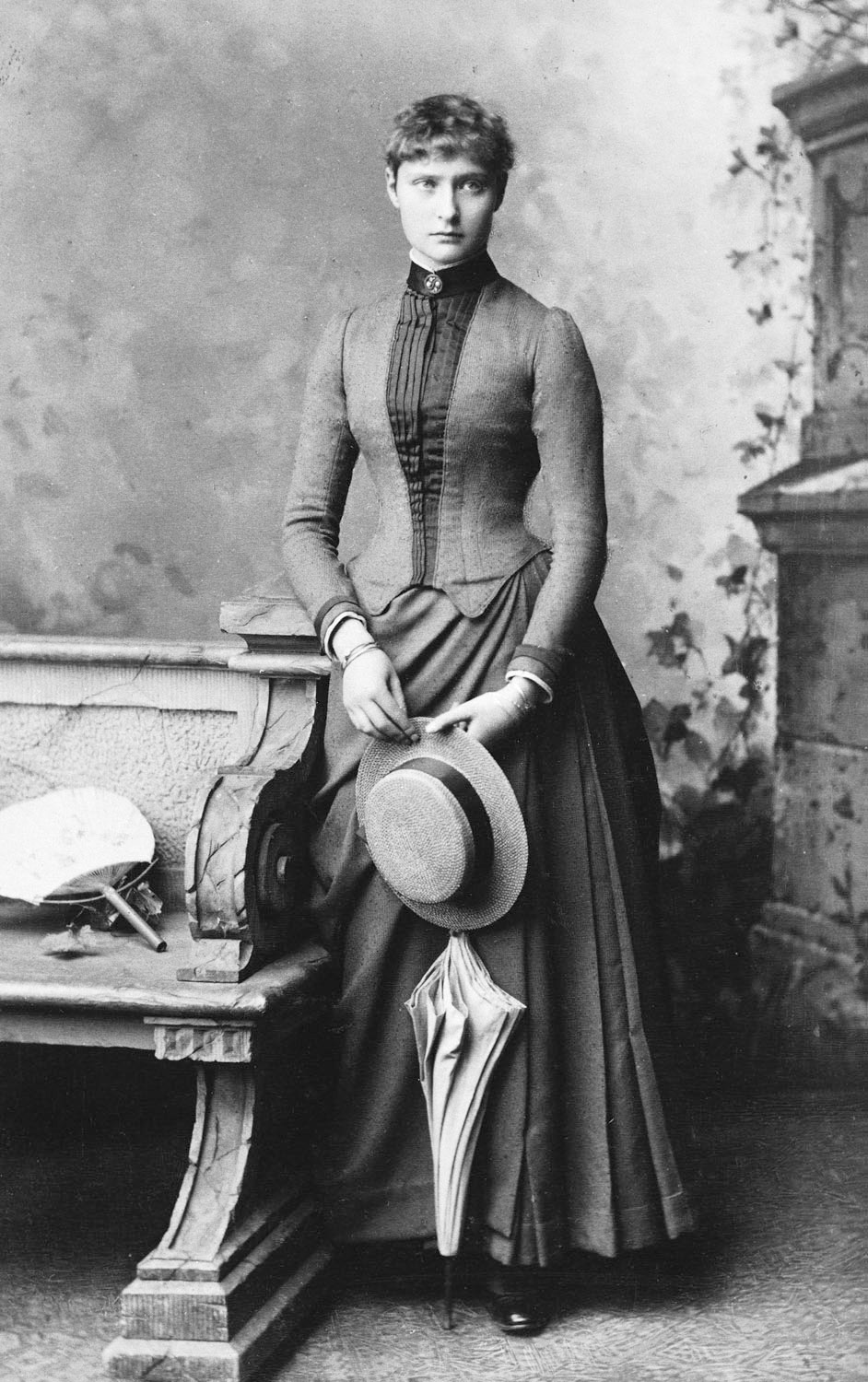
9 - 1887

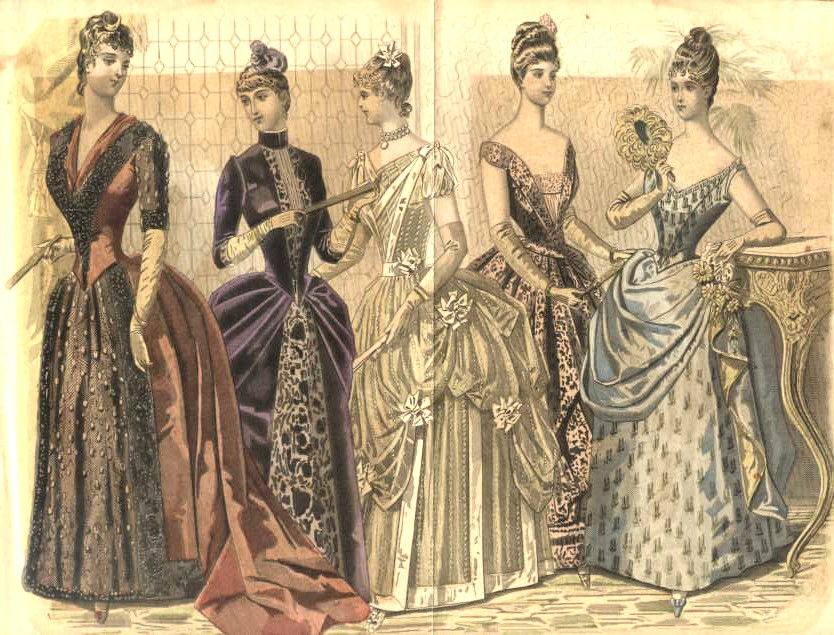
10 – 1888

11 – 1888

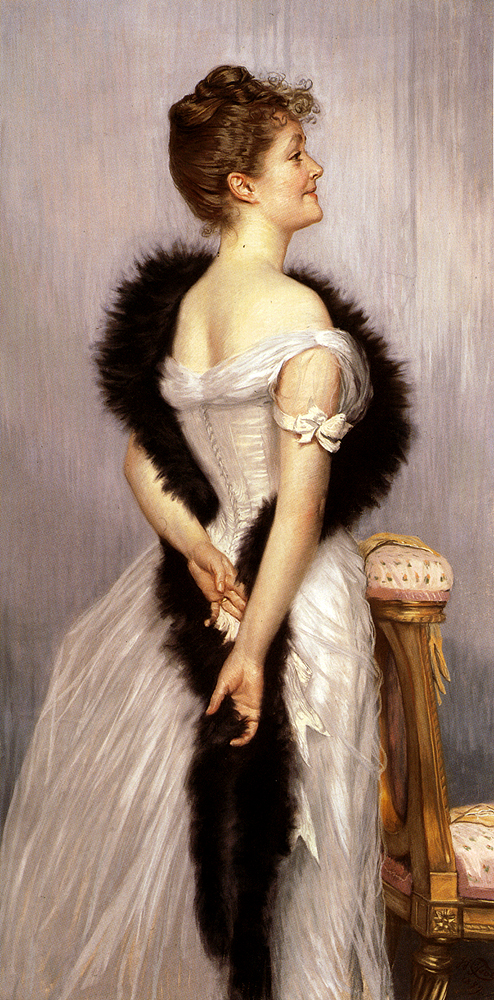
12 – 1889
1. Empress Elisabeth of Austria in a riding habit, 1884. Her habit has the fashionable corseted silhouette, with a simpler skirt suited for riding, tall shirt collar, and top hat.
2. Two-piece dress of c. 1885 the "back shelf" bustle. The bodice is draped up at both sides and worn over a matching underskirt. Los Angeles County Museum of Art, M.2007.211.34a-b.
3. Madame Paul Poirson wears the fashionable neckline of mid-decade, wide at the bust and narrower at the shoulder. Flowers trim her bodice, hair, and draped skirt, 1885.
4. Pair of embroidered suede boots by F. Pinet, Paris, c. 1885. Los Angeles County Museum of Art, M.58.4a-b
5. Outfit which is both strongly influenced by menswear and bustled. Hair is upswept, with bangs. Elbow-length gloves meet the shorter sleeves.
6. "Woman with a fan made of feathers", photograph by Alvan S. Harper
7. Hairstyle of 1887 is swept up into a knot, with the front hair curled and frizzled over the forehead.
8. Fashions from La Mode Illustrée show dresses made of contrasting fabrics worn with "shelf" bustles and opera-length gloves, 1887.
9. Alexandra Feodorovna (Alix of Hesse) wears a high-necked day dress, 1887.
10. Fashions of 1888 feature full busts, large "shelf" bustles, and wide shoulders. Gloves reach the elbow or slightly above.
11. DeLancey Astor Kane wears a high-necked black satin costume trimmed with beaded passementerie, 1888.
12. Vicomtesse De Montmorand wears a gown fastened in back, without a bustle, signalling the styles of the next decade. Her hair is twisted into a small knot on top of her head and is worn with a curly fringe or bangs, 1889.

=== Atypical high-fashion ===
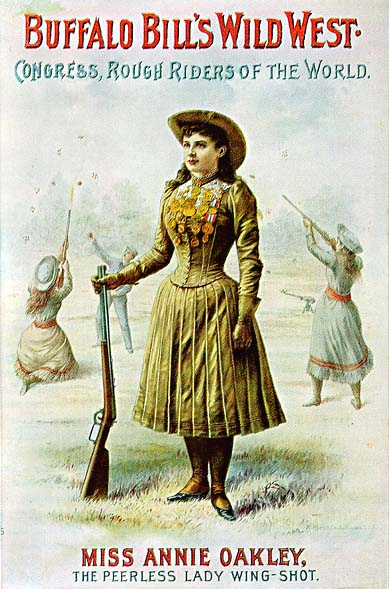
1 – second half of decade

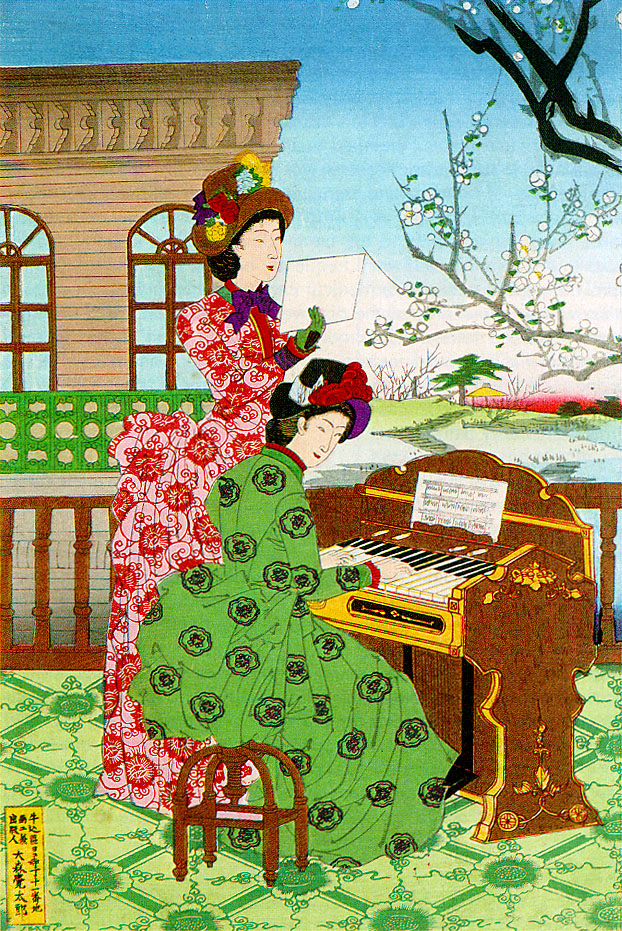
2 – 1887
1. The 1880s idea of practical women's attire is seen in this poster showing Annie Oakley wearing shorter skirts and a complete lack of a bustle (acceptable for poorer rural frontier women and/or paid public performers).
2. Japanese print showing two young ladies in Western fashions or yofuku. The garments are cut and constructed using Western techniques, with the fabric colors and patterns typical of the Meiji era.

== Men's fashion ==
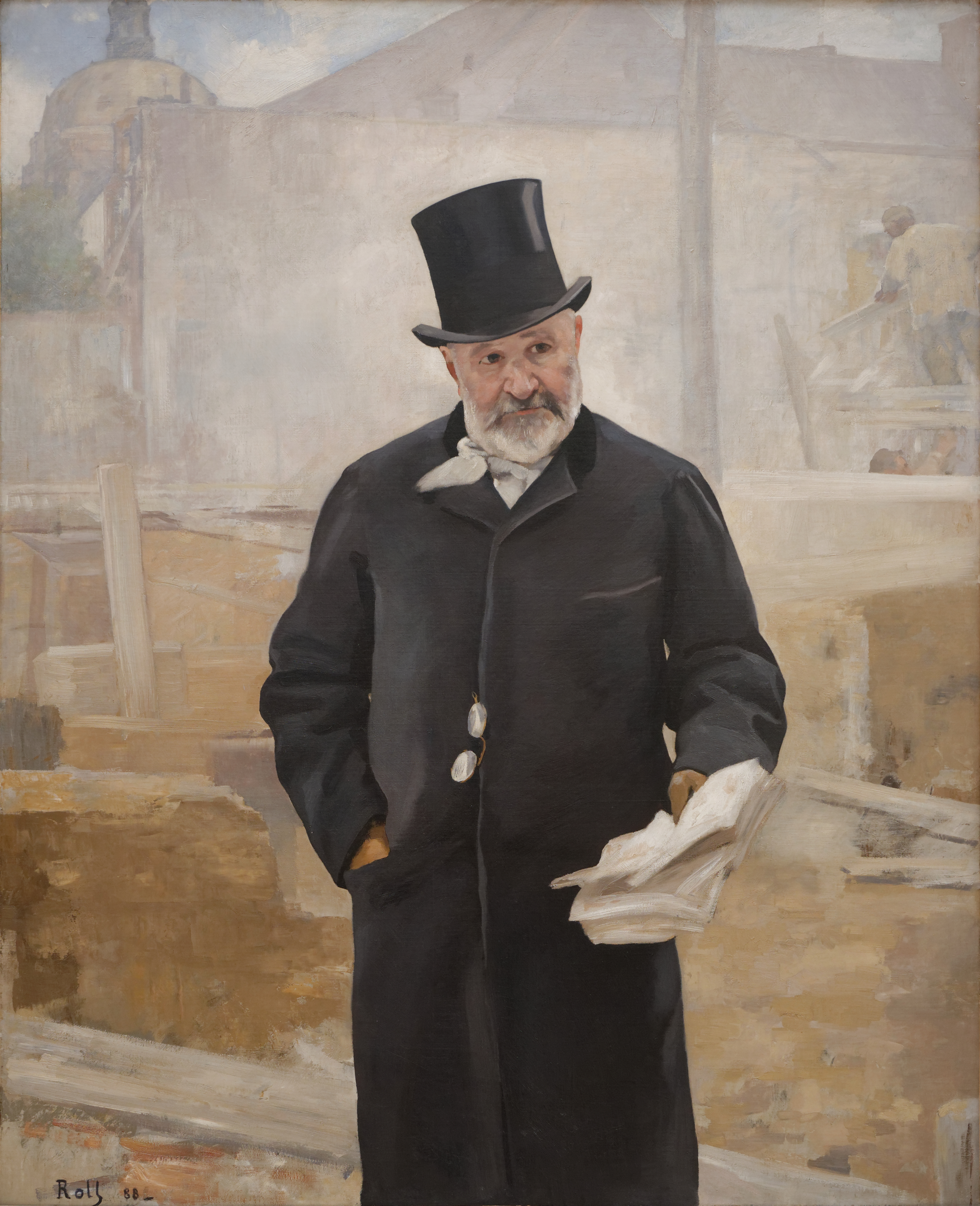
Engineer Adolphe Alphand wears a topcoat or overcoat with a velvet collar, 1887.

=== Coats, jackets, and trousers ===
Three piece suits, "ditto suits", consisting of a sack coat with matching waistcoat (U.S. vest) and trousers (called in the UK a "lounge suit") continued as an informal alternative to the contrasting frock coat, waistcoat and trousers.

The cutaway morning coat was still worn for formal day occasions in Europe and major cities elsewhere, with a dress shirt and an ascot tie. The most formal evening dress remained a dark tail coat and trousers with a dark waistcoat. Evening wear was worn with a white bow tie and a shirt with a winged collar.

In mid-decade, a more relaxed formal coat appeared: the dinner jacket or tuxedo, which featured a shawl collar with silk or satin facings, and one or two buttons. Dinner jackets were appropriate when "dressing for dinner" at home or at a men's club.

The Norfolk jacket was popular for shooting and rugged outdoor pursuits. It was made of sturdy tweed or similar fabric and featured paired box pleats over the chest and back, with a fabric belt.

Full-length trousers were worn for most occasions; tweed or woollen breeches were worn for hunting and other outdoor pursuits.

Knee-length topcoats, often with contrasting velvet or fur collars, and calf-length overcoats were worn in winter.

By the 1880s the majority of the working class, even shepherds, adopted jackets and waistcoats in fustian and corduroy with corduroy trousers, giving up their smock frocks.

=== Shirts and neckties ===
Shirt collars were turned over or pressed into "wings". Dress shirts had stiff fronts, sometimes decorated with shirt studs, and buttoned up the back.

The usual necktie was the four-in-hand or the newly fashionable Ascot tie, made up as a neckband with wide wings attached and worn with a stickpin.

Narrow ribbon ties were tied in a bow, and the white bowtie was worn with formal evening wear.

=== Accessories ===
As in the 1870s, top hats remained a requirement for upper class formal wear; bowlers and soft felt hats in a variety of shapes were worn for more casual occasions, and flat straw boaters were worn for yachting and other nautical pastimes.

Shoes of the 1880s had higher heels and a narrow toe.

=== Style gallery ===
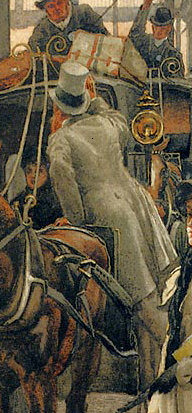
1 – c. 1880

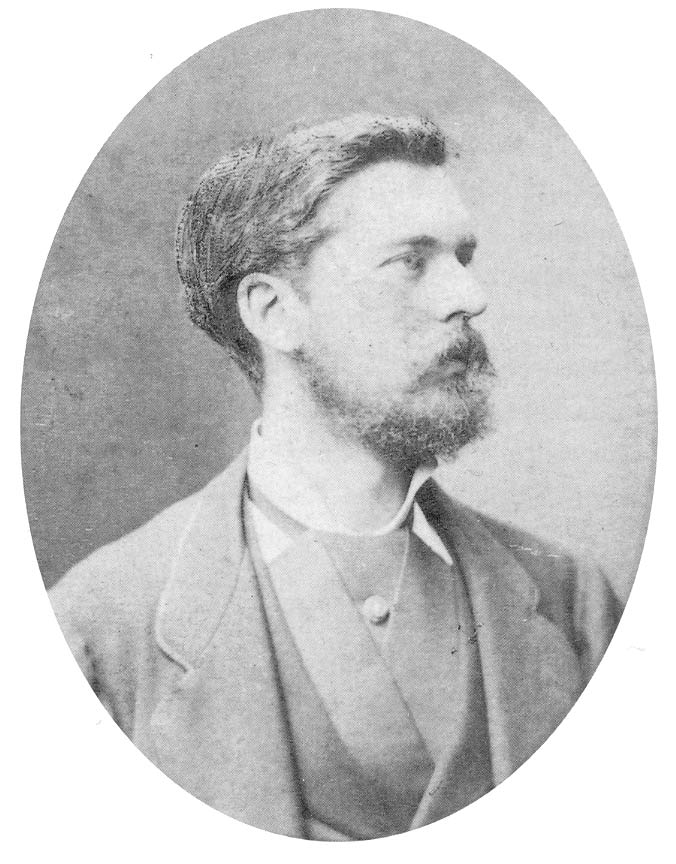
2 – c. 1880

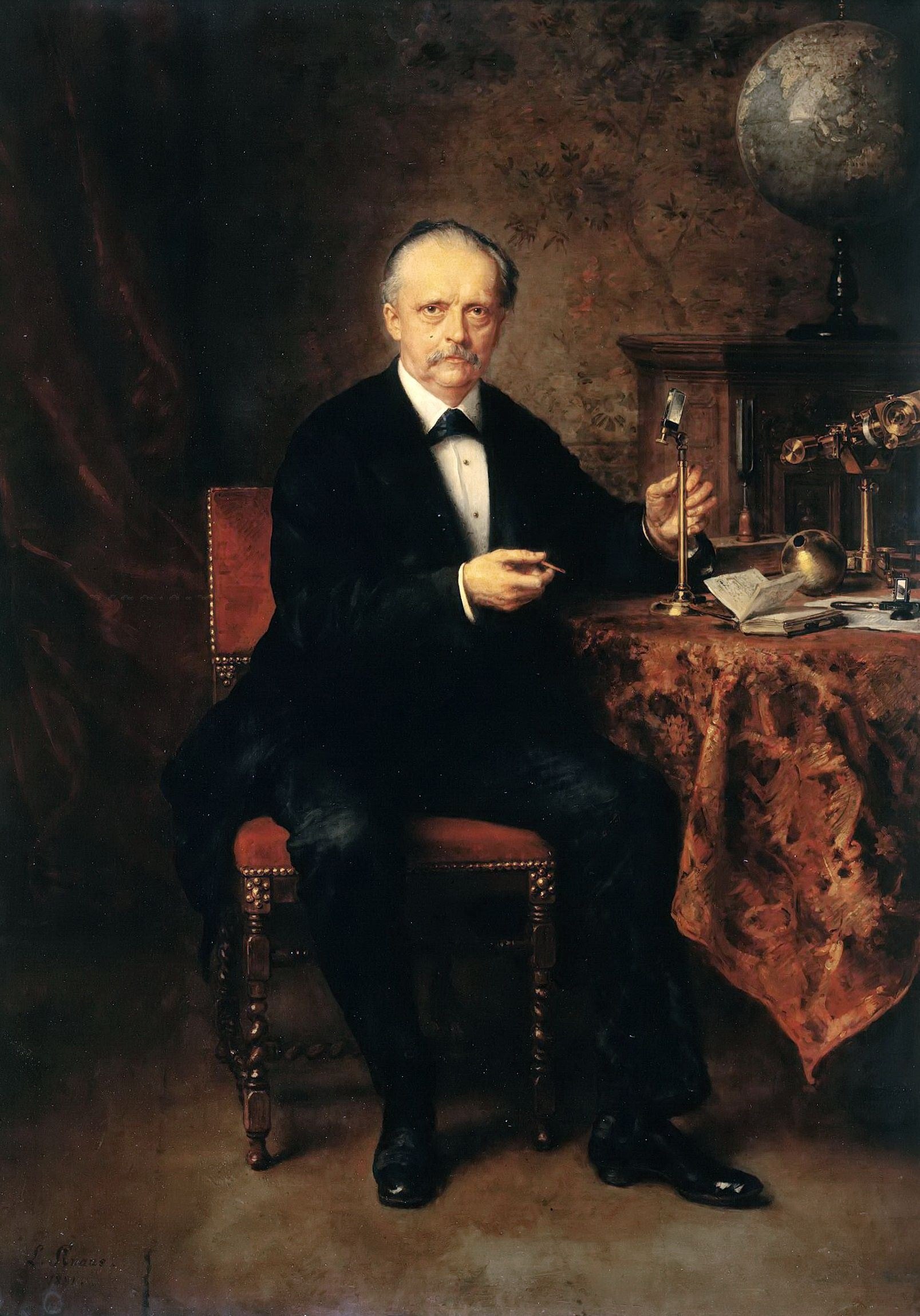
3 – 1881

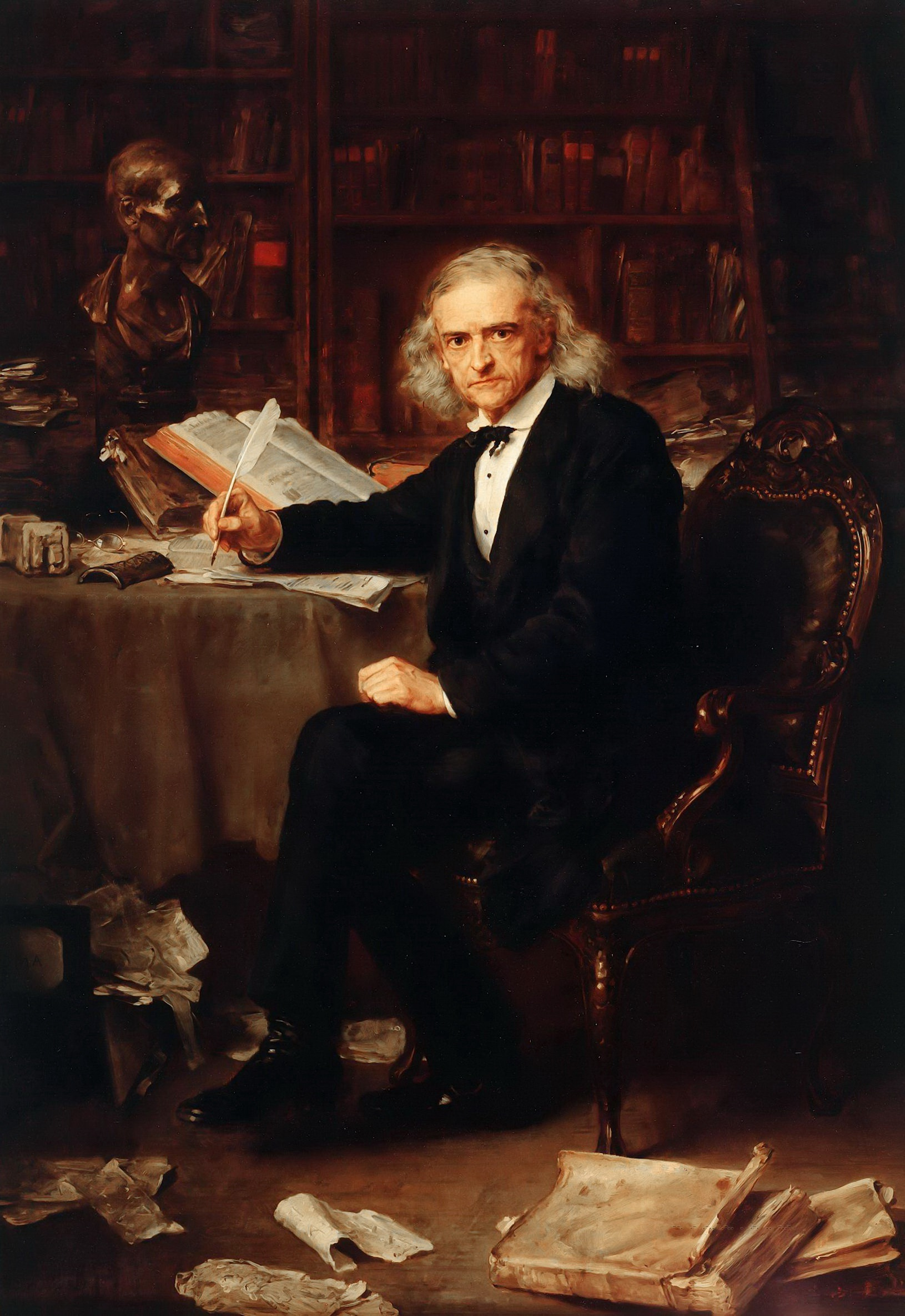
4 – 1881

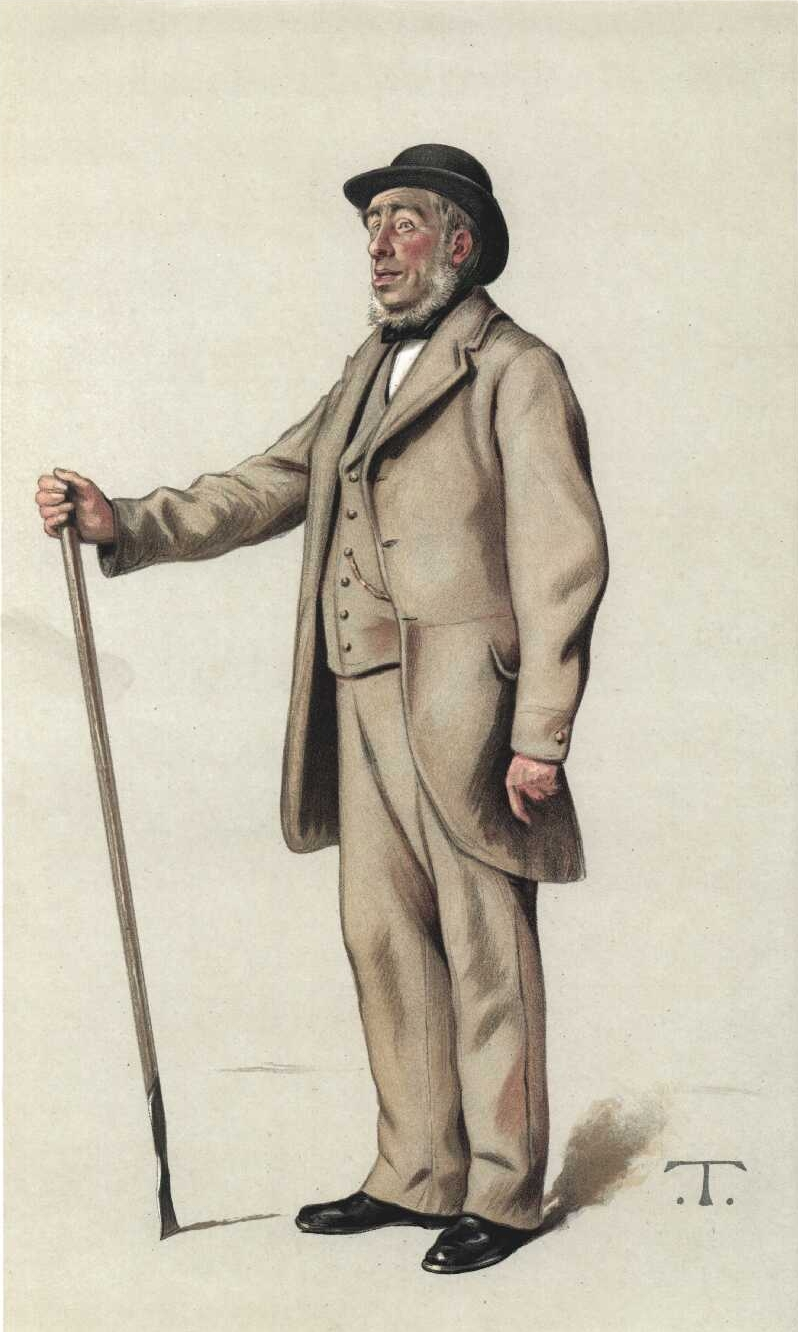
5 – 1882

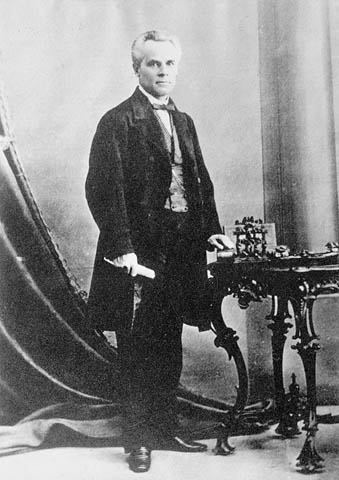
6 – After 1882

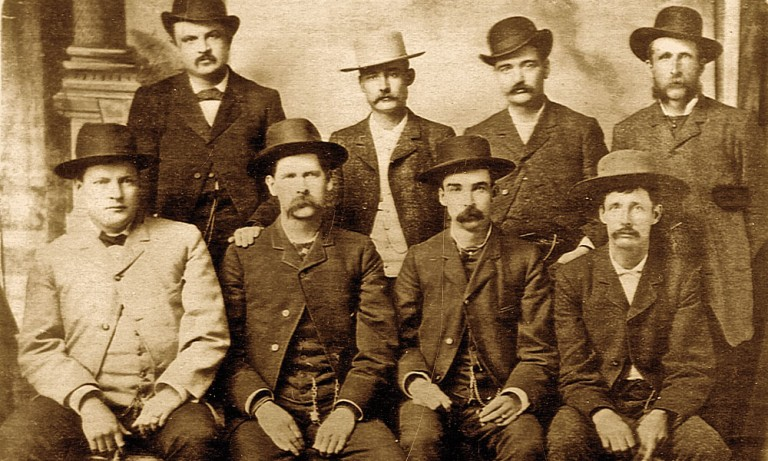
7 - 1883

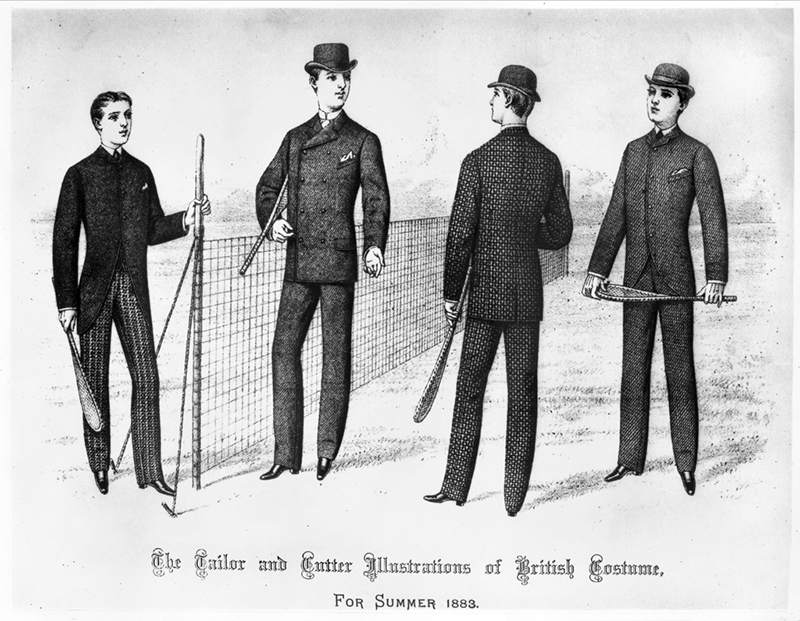
8 - 1883

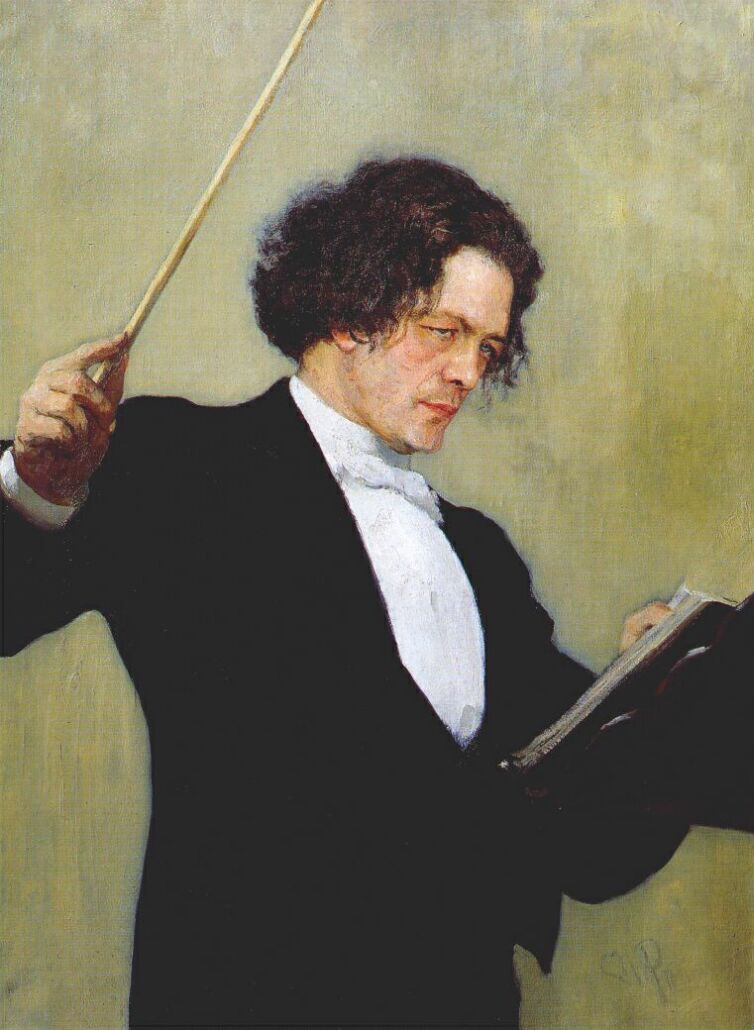
9 - 1887
1. British traveler wears a grey frock coat and matching trousers with a grey top hat, 1880. The coat has two covered buttons at the back waist.
2. John Singer Sargent wears a formally pleated Ascot tie. His shirt collar has softly curled wings, c. 1880.
3. Hermann von Helmholtz wears a dark coat, waistcoat, and trousers with a stiff-fronted and stiff-collared shirt, German, 1881.
4. Theodor Mommsen wears a narrow necktie tied in a bow with his dark suit, German, 1881.
5. Vanity Fair sketch of agricultural scientist John Bennet Lawes portrays him in walking clothes. His coat with a waist seam and skirts cutaway in a smooth curve is worn with matching trousers and collared waistcoat, 1882.
6. George-Étienne Cartier wears a dark frock coat, a decorative double-breasted waistcoat, and a narrow bow tie. Montreal, after 1882.
7. Lawmen of Dodge City wear their coats with only the high top button fastened. Wyatt Earp (front row, second from left) wears a three-piece "ditto" suit with contrasting binding around the coat collar and lapel, 1883.
8. British menswear summer 1883.
9. Composer Anton Rubinstein conducts in formal evening wear (dark coat, trousers, and waistcoat, white shirt and tie), 1887.

== Children's fashion ==
Young girls wore dresses with round collars and sashes. Fashionable dresses had dropped waists. Pinafores were worn for work and play. When going out, especially in the winter, girls wore many layers to keep warm. A warm coat was worn with kid leather gloves. Gloves were worn under a muff hand warmer, so when the girl removed her hands from the muff, her gloves would keep them warm. Just like ladies, all upper-class Victorian girls wore gloves when going out. A hat or bonnet was worn as well, along with long, knee-length button-up boots or shorter boots with gaiters to give the appearance of wearing long boots.

Older boys wore knee-length breeches and jackets with round-collared shirts.

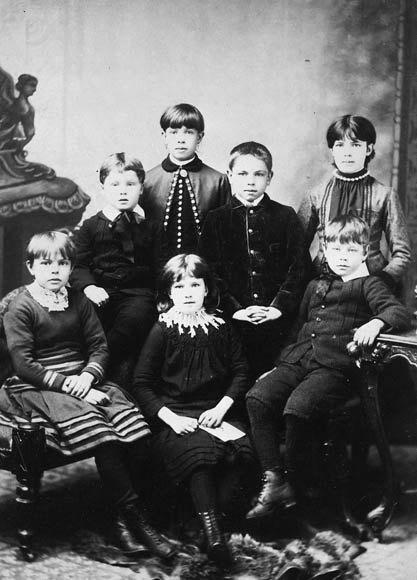
Canada, c. 1880

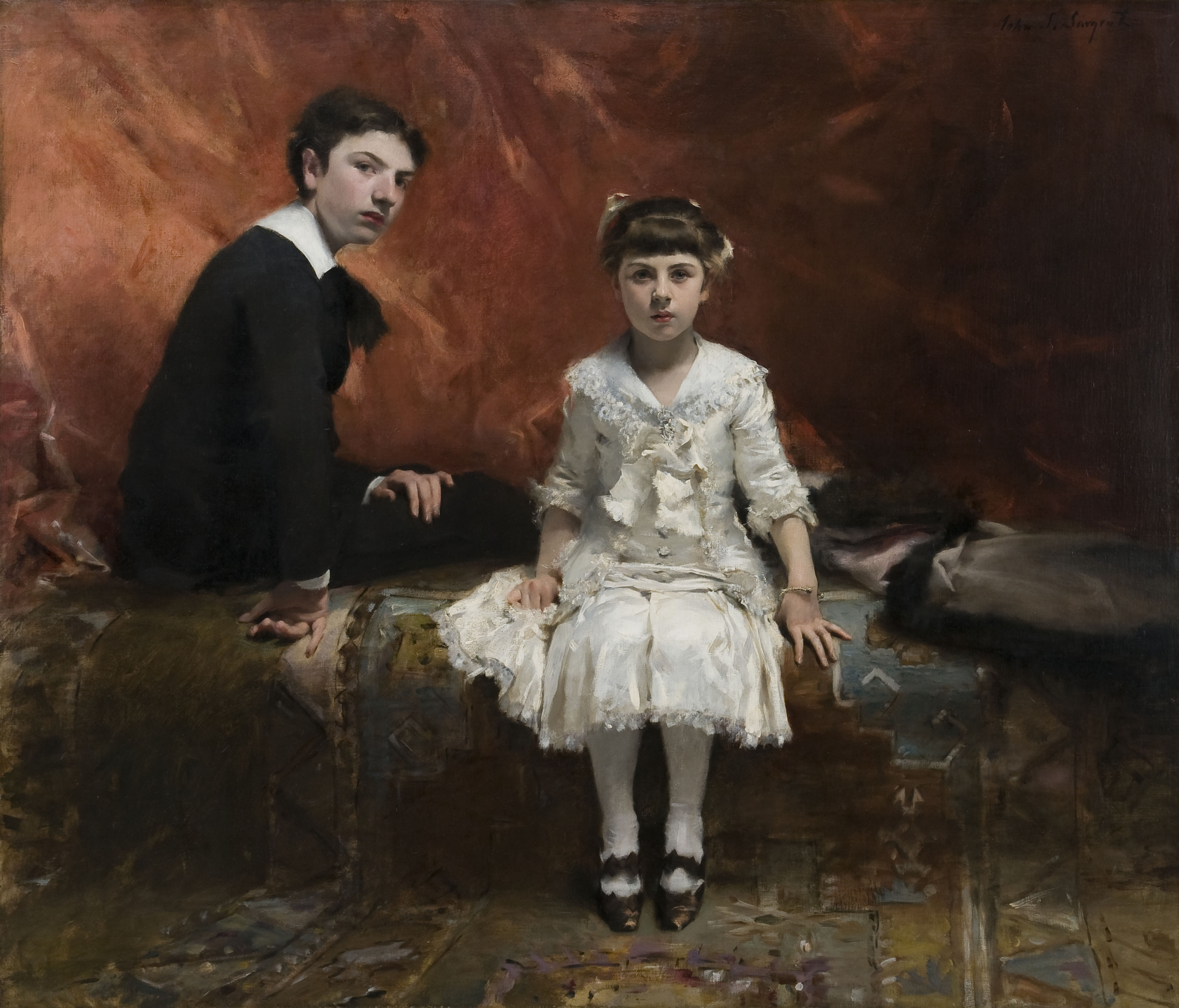
France, 1881

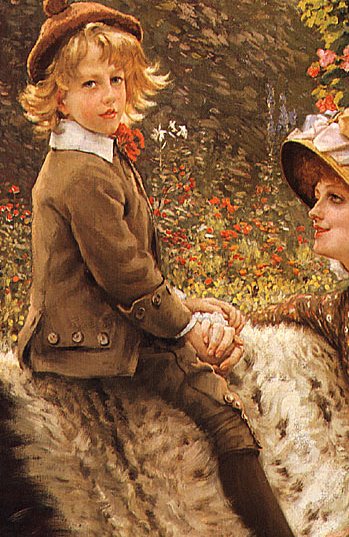
1882

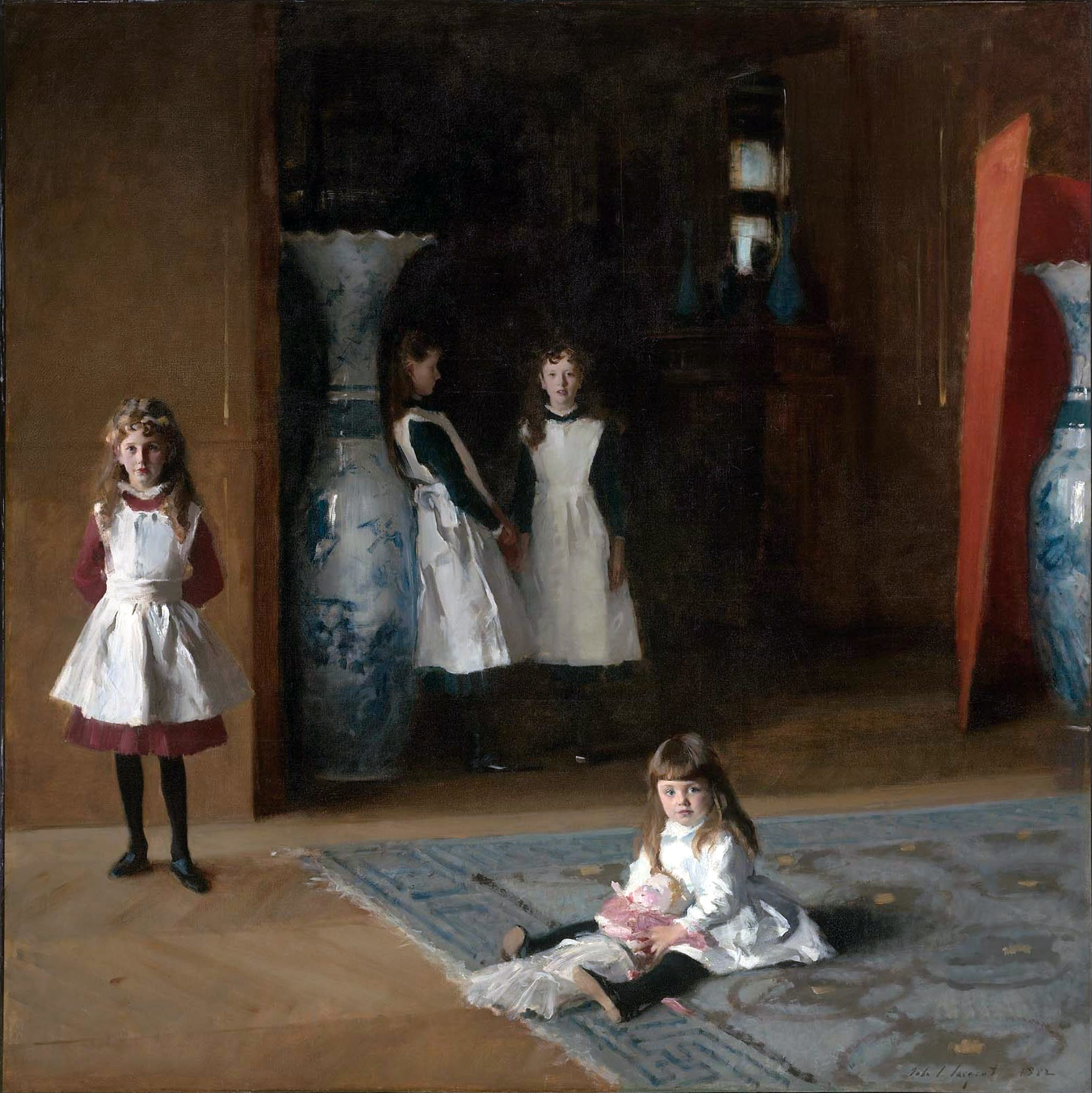
1882

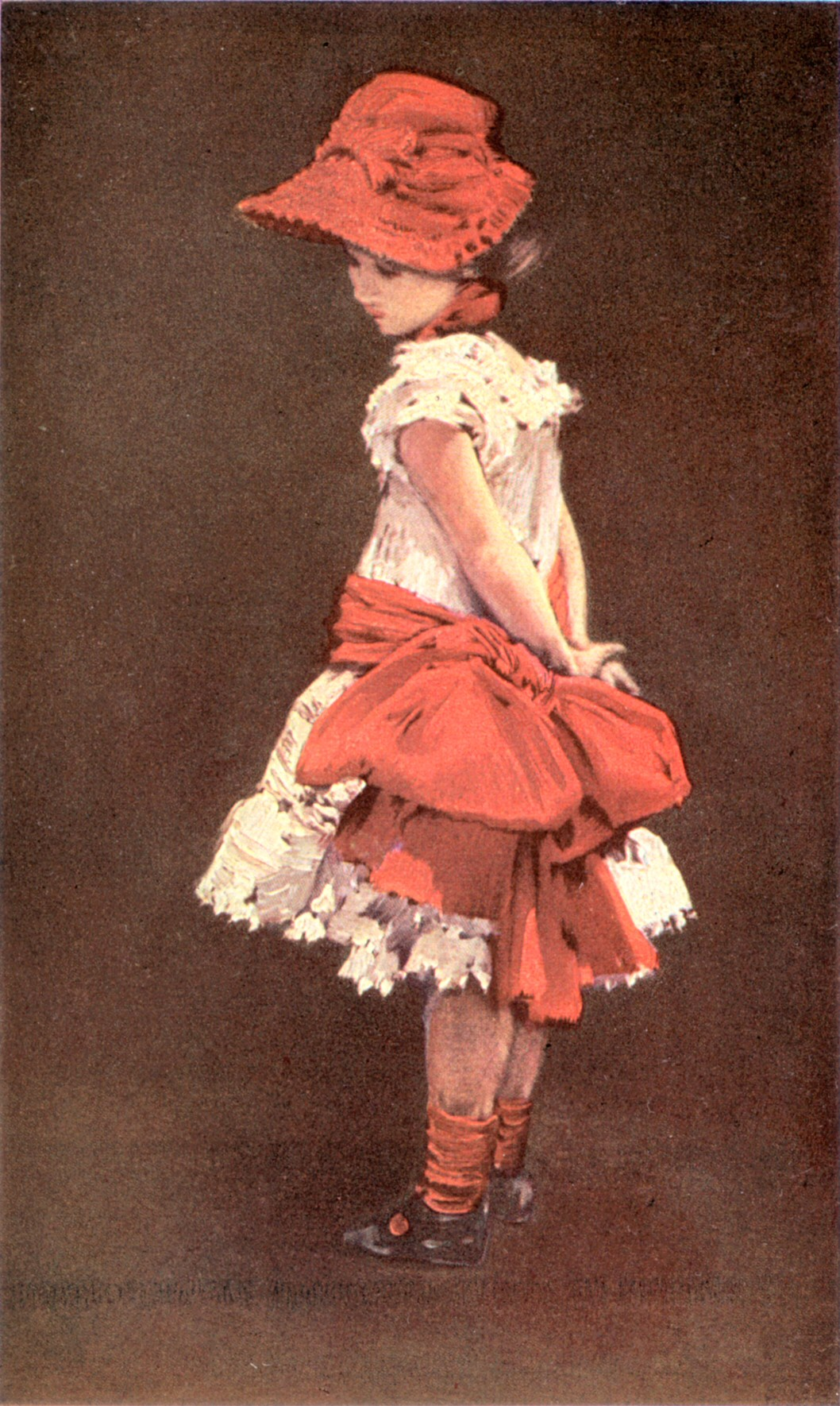
Paris, 1883

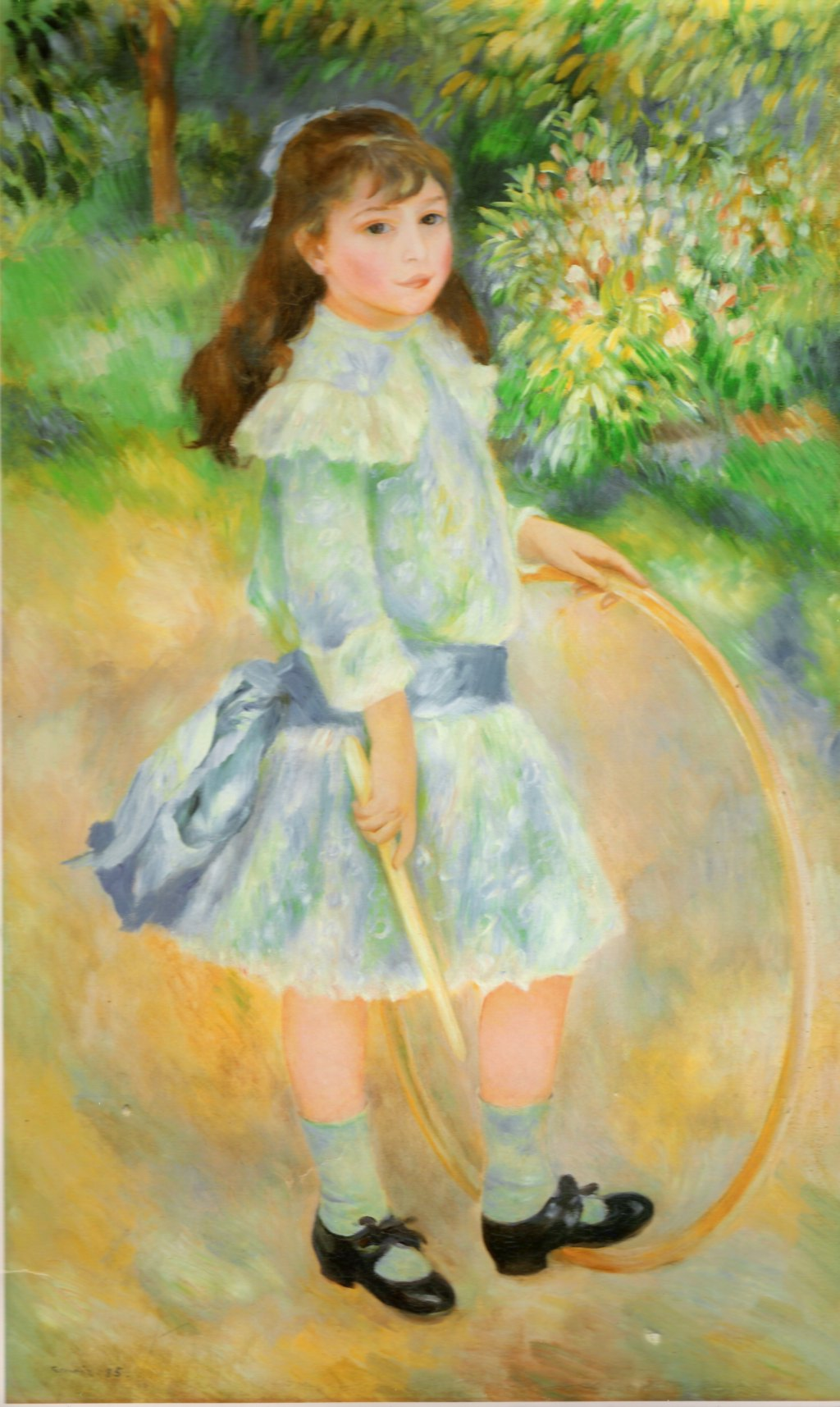
France, 1885

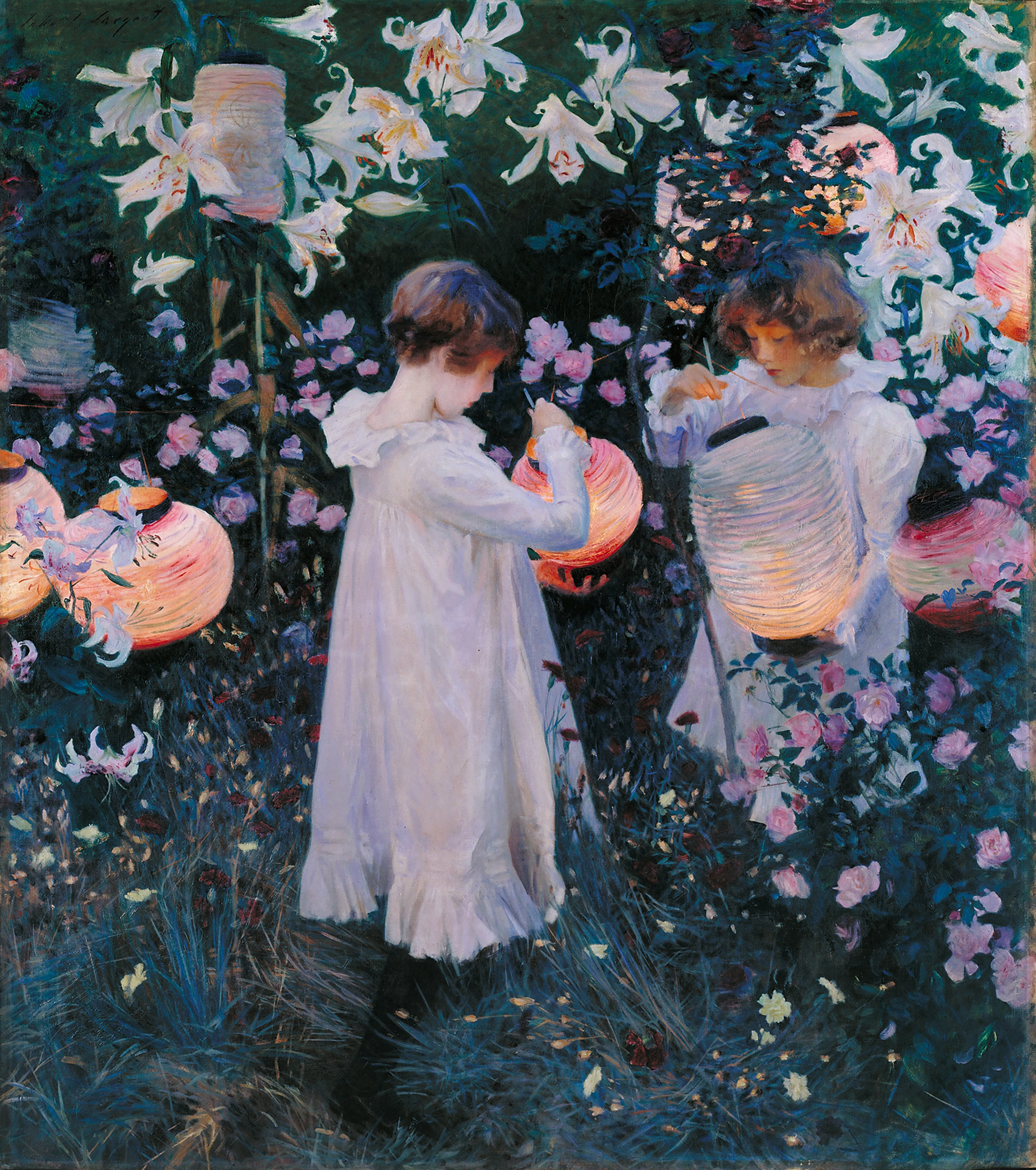
1885–1886

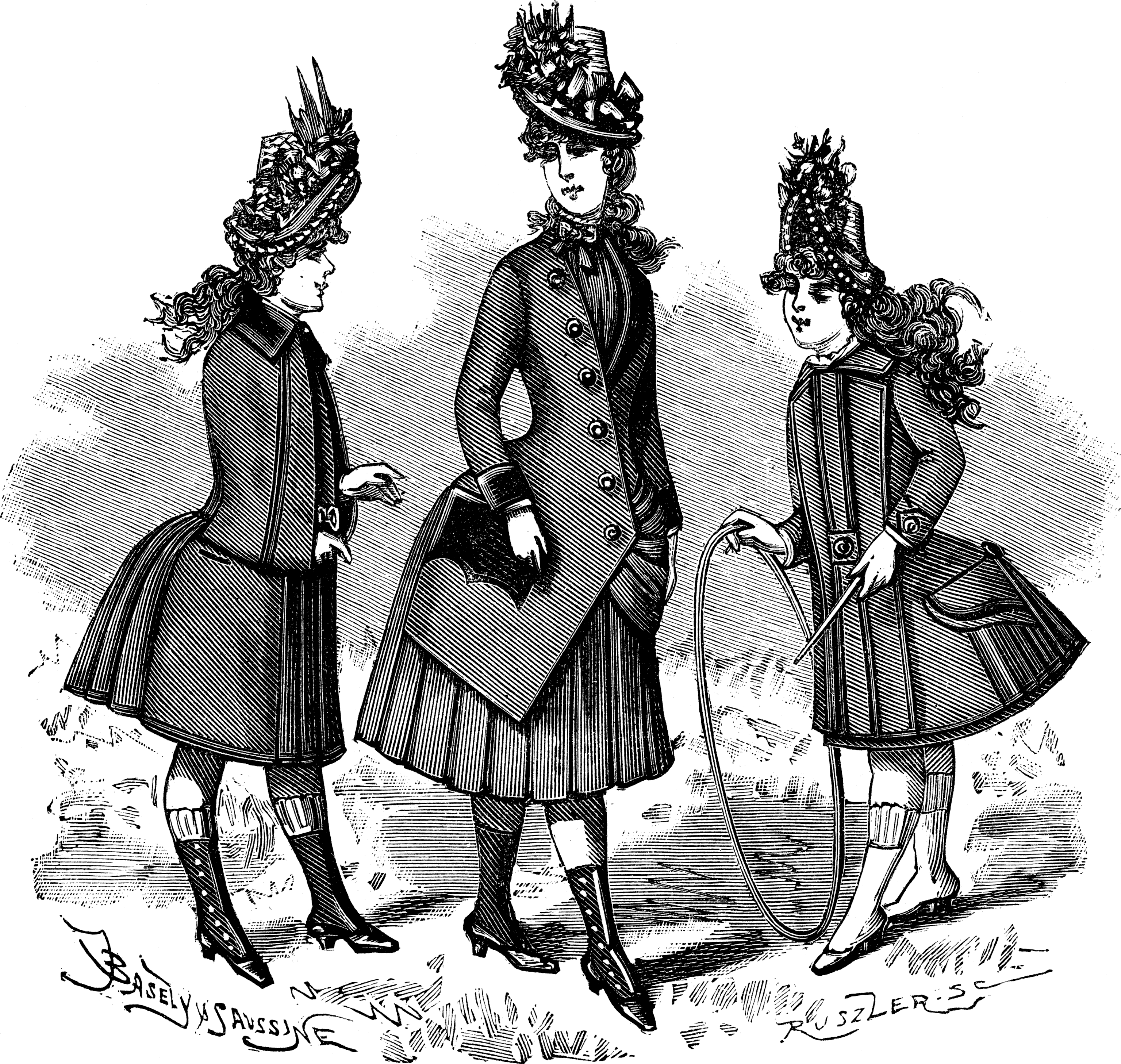
Bustled fashions for girls. 1886

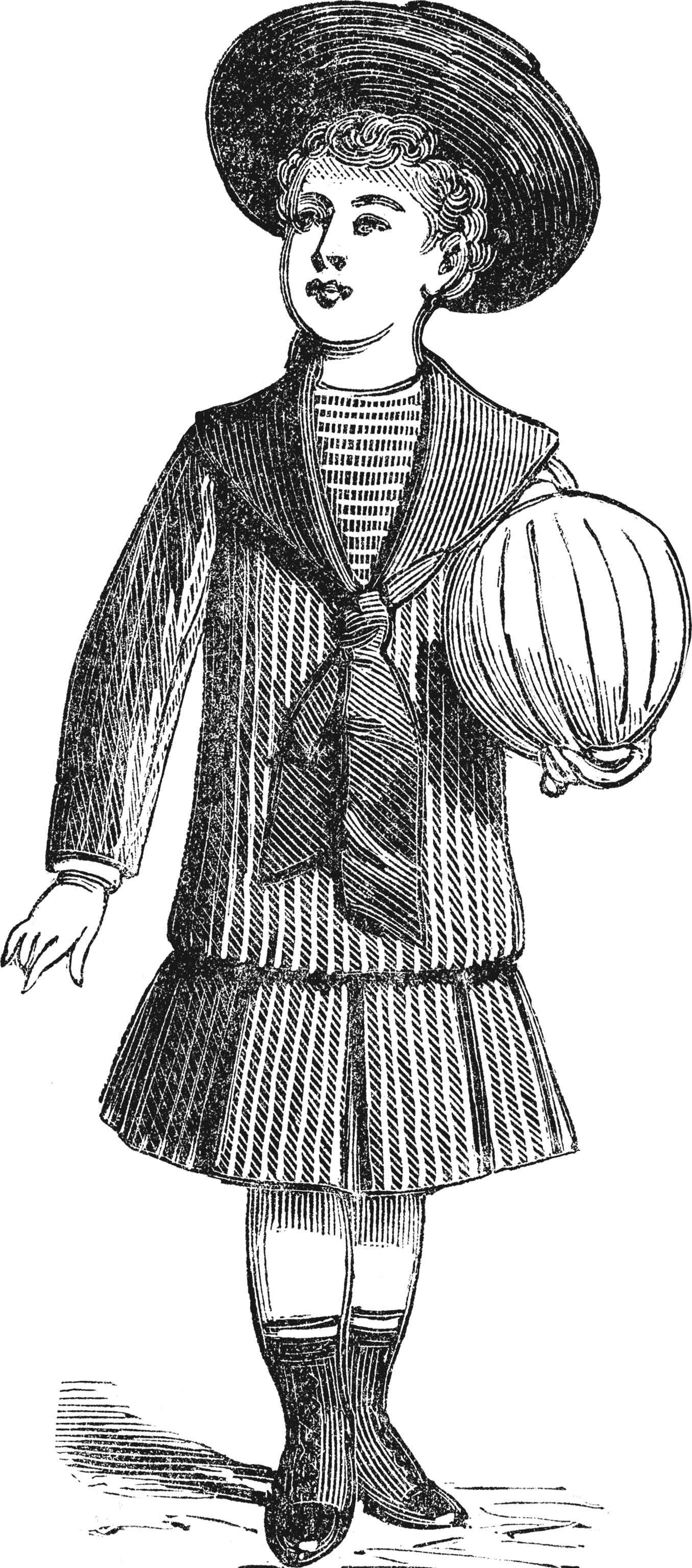
Boy 5 years old in skirt. 1887

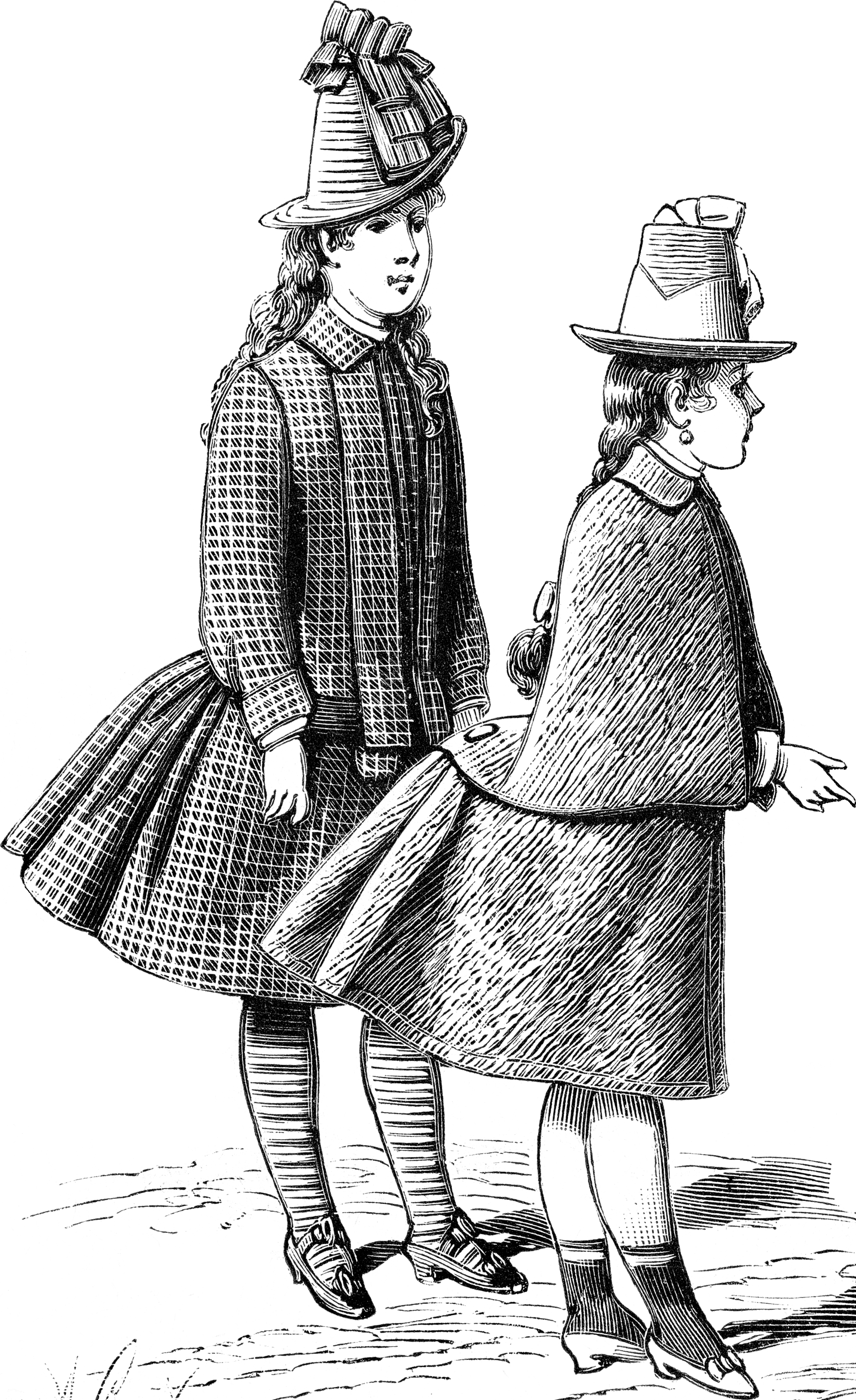
Bustled fashions for girls. 1887

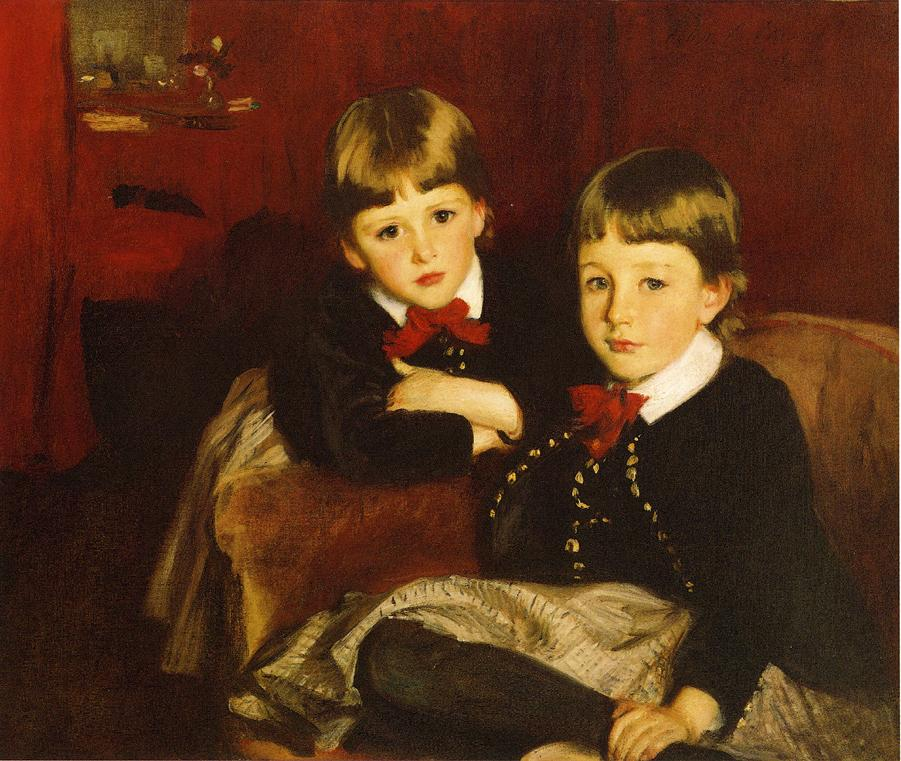
1887

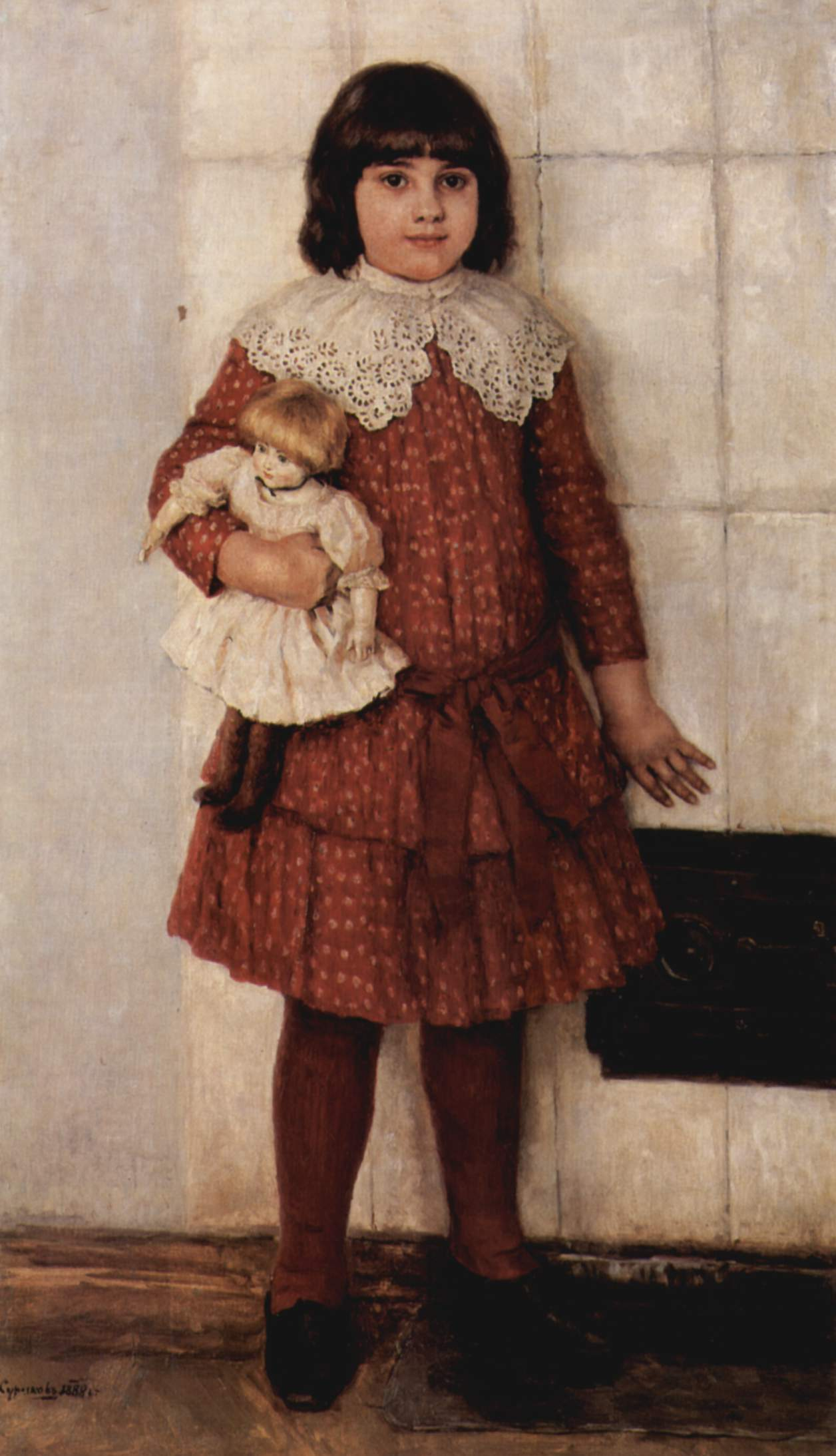
Russia, 1888

== Working clothes ==
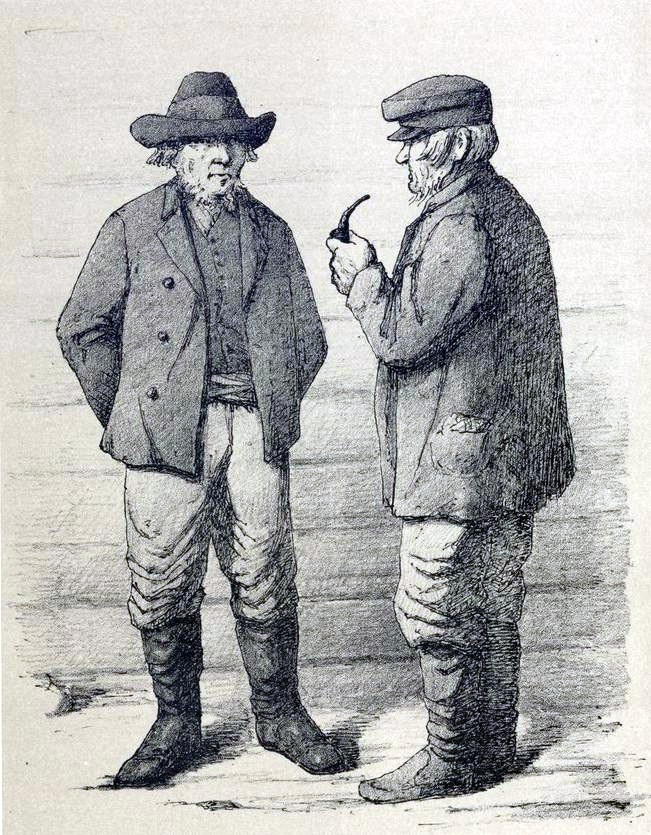
Freeholders of Ruokolahti, Finland, 1882

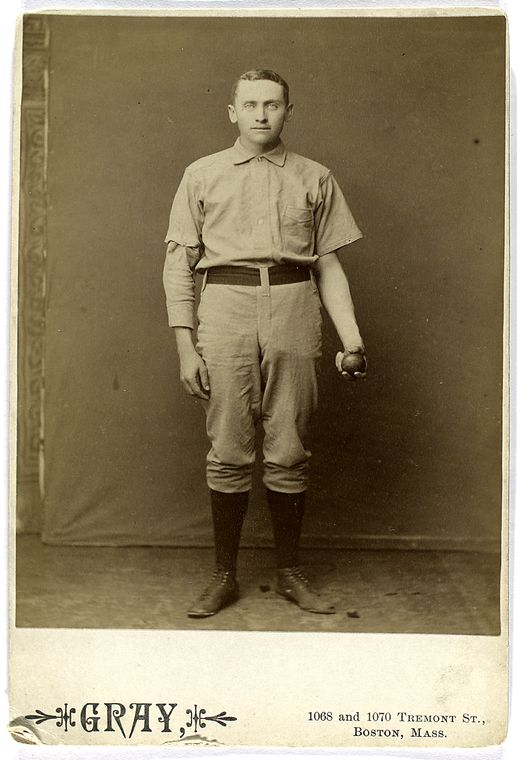
Baseball pitcher Dan Casey, c. 1885

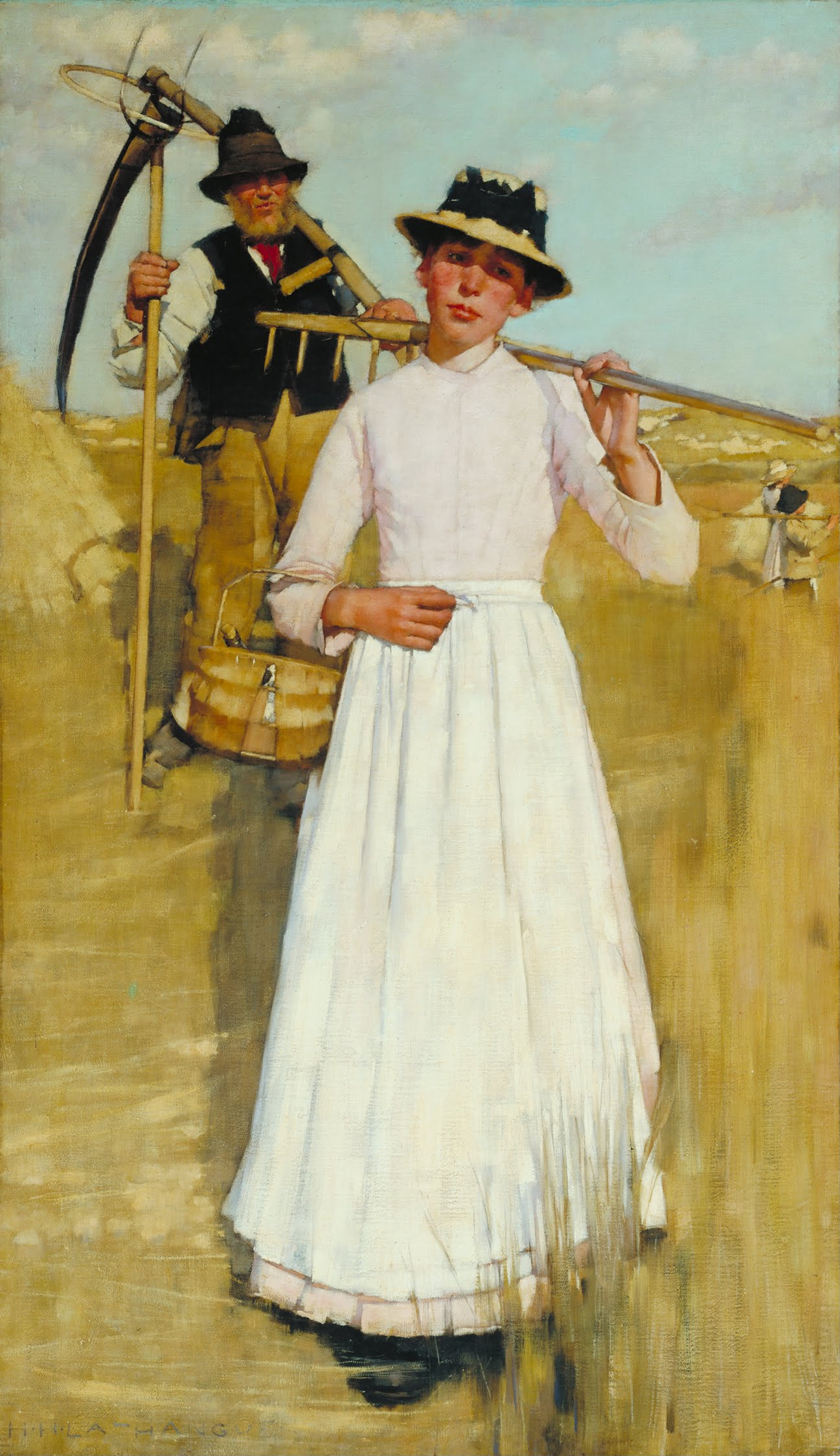
French reapers, 1886

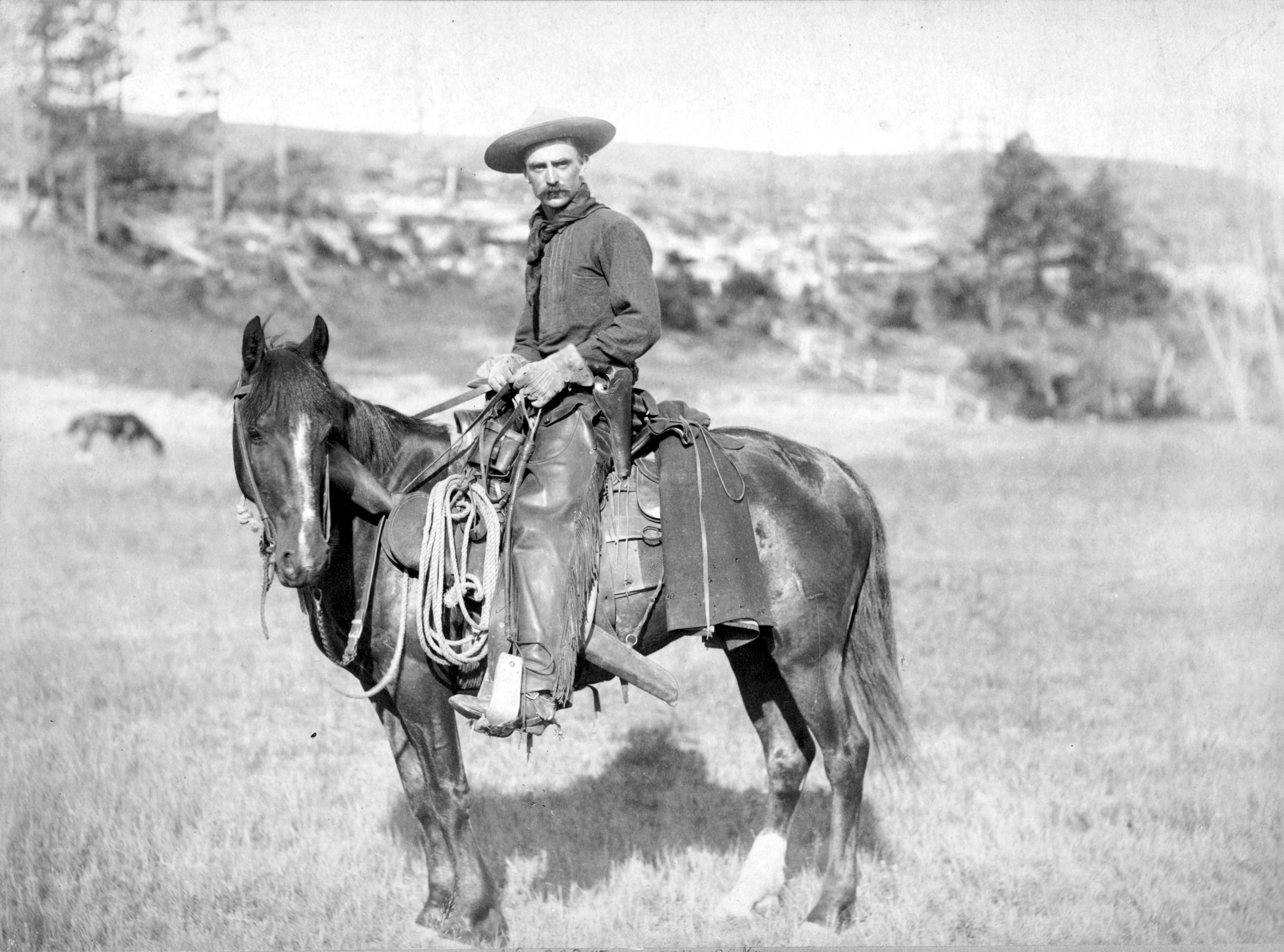
Cowboy, c. 1888, South Dakota

== See also ==
- Artistic Dress movement
- Corset controversy
- Dress code
- Svenska drägtreformföreningen
- Victorian fashion
- Victorian dress reform
