= The Bridesmaid (Tissot) =

Painting by James Tissot

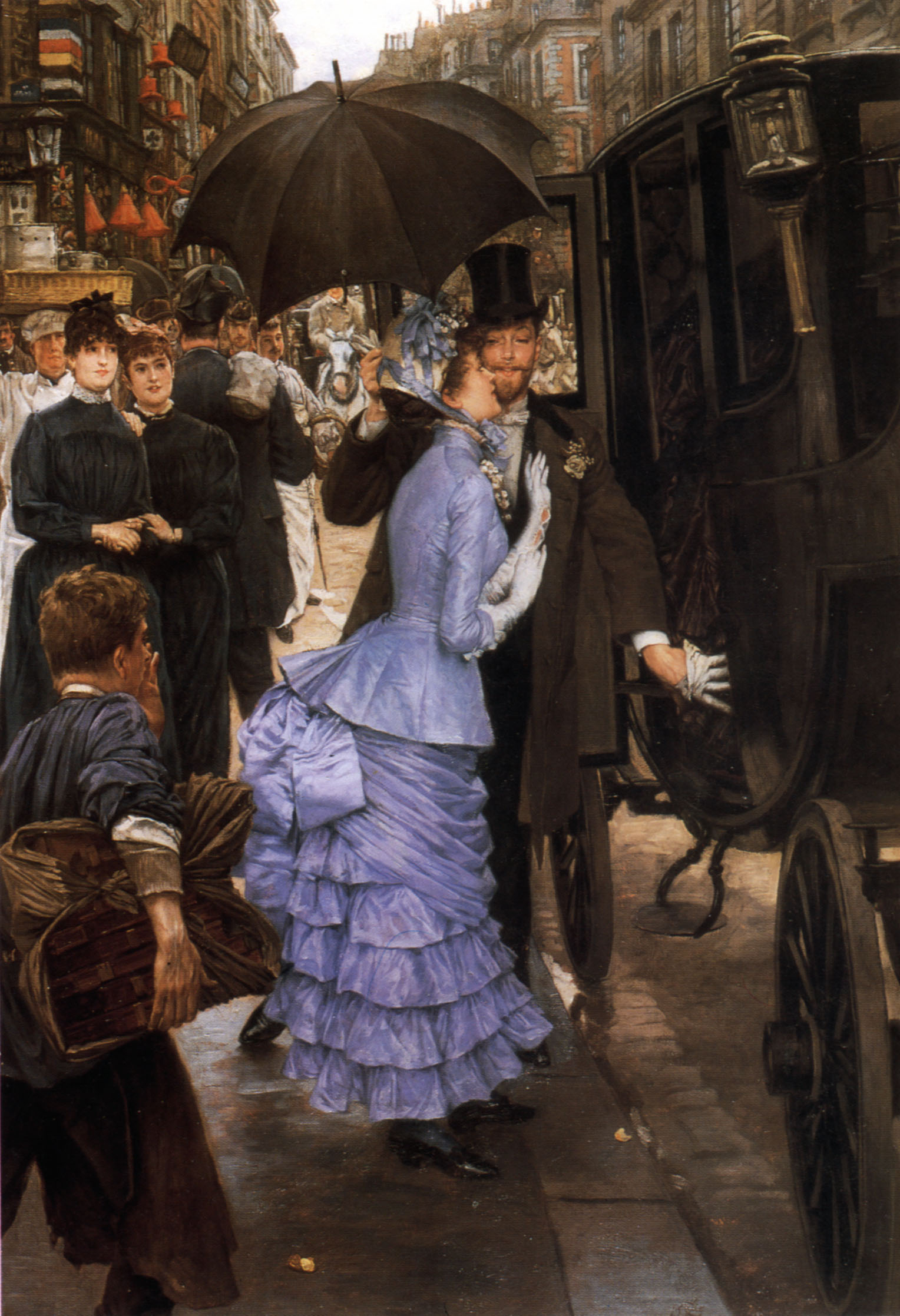
- Artist: James Tissot
- Year: 1883-85
- Type: Oil on canvas, genre painting
- Dimensions: 147.3 cm × 101.6 cm (58.0 in × 40.0 in)
- Location: Leeds Art Gallery, West Yorkshire

The Bridesmaid is a c.1885 oil painting by the French artist James Tissot. It depicts an attractive young bridesmaid being helped into a carriage by a groomsman in a bustling Paris street as passers-by turn to look at her. Tissot emphasises her fashionable dress.

Tissot had spent more than a decade in England where he became celebrated for his stylish portrayals of everyday life during the Victorian era. In 1883 he relocated to his native France and embarked on a series of fifteen paintings depicting the woman of the capital during the Belle Époque. Latrer pivoted to producing biblical scenes. Today the painting is in the collection of Leeds Art Gallery in Yorkshire, having been acquired in 1897.

== Bibliography ==
- Ash, Russell. James Tissot. Pavilion, 1992.
- Marshall, Nancy Rose & Warner, Malcolm. James Tissot: Victorian Life, Modern Love. Yale University Press, 1999.
- Wentworth, Michael. James Tissot. Clarendon Press, 1984.
