= 1840s in Western fashion =

Queen Victoria and the Prince Consort at home, 1841. Her dress shows the fashionable silhouette, with its pointed waist, sloping shoulder, and bell-shaped skirt.

1840s fashion in European and European-influenced clothing is characterized by a narrow, natural shoulder line following the exaggerated puffed sleeves of the later 1820s and 1830s. The narrower shoulder was accompanied by a lower waistline for both men and women.

== Women's fashion ==
=== Gowns ===
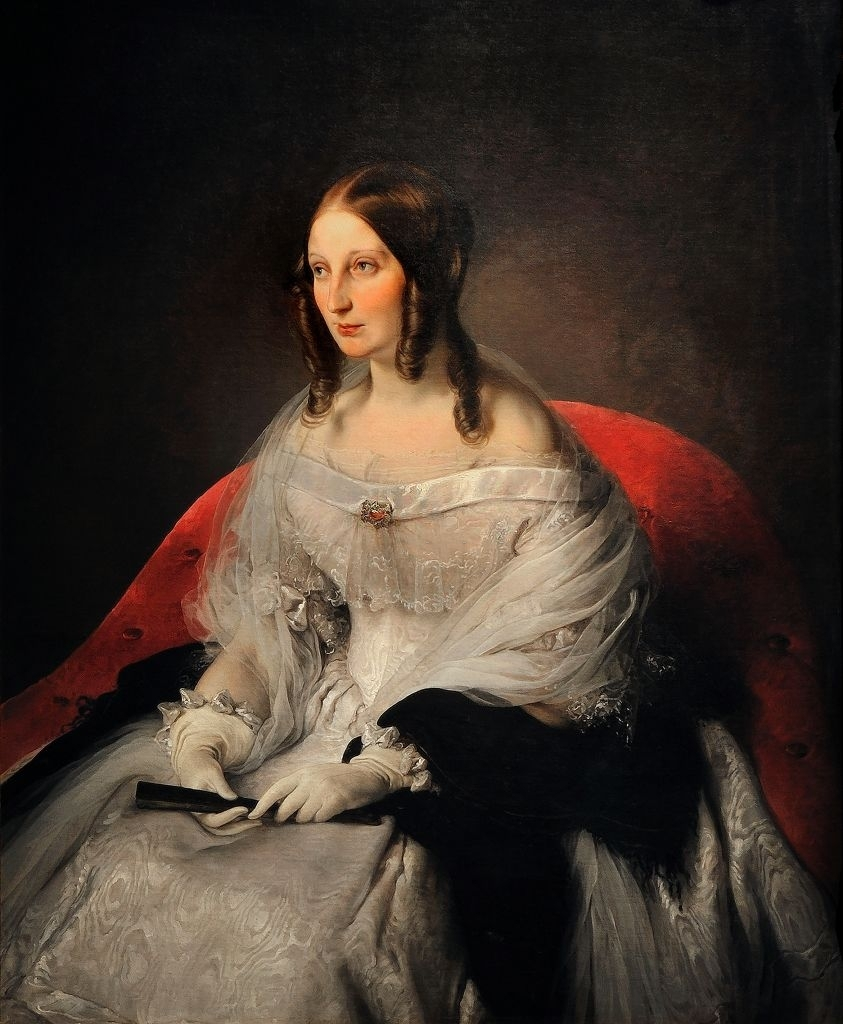
Princess di Sant' Antimo's gown of watered silk shows the short sleeves, lace flounce collar, and long pointed waist of the early 1840s. The tiny pleats that gather her skirt can be seen at the waistline. 1840–1844.

Shoulders were narrow and sloping, waists became low and pointed, and sleeve detail migrated from the elbow to the wrists. Where pleated fabric panels had wrapped the bust and shoulders in the previous decade, they now formed a triangle from the shoulder to the waist of day dresses.

Skirts evolved from a conical shape to a bell shape, aided by a new method of attaching the skirts to the bodice using organ or cartridge pleats which cause the skirt to spring out from the waist. Full skirts were achieved mainly through layers of petticoats. The increasing weight and inconvenience of the layers of starched petticoats would lead to the development of the crinoline of the second half of the 1850s.

Sleeves were narrower and fullness dropped from just below the shoulder at the beginning of the decade to the lower arm, leading toward the flared pagoda sleeves of the 1850s and 1860s.

Gowns were worn off the shoulder and featured wide flounces that reached to the elbow, often of lace. They were worn with sheer shawls and opera-length gloves. Other greatly worn hand accessories were a new kind of gloves, usually reaching the forearm in length. These gloves had a lace trim in sophisticated flower designs.

Another accessory was a small bag. At home, bags were often white satin and embroidered or painted. Outdoor bags were often green or white and tasseled. There were also crocheted linen bags.

Shoes were made from the same materials as handbags. There were slippers of crocheted linen and bright colored brocade satin slippers that tied around the ankle with silk ribbon.

=== Hairstyles and headgear ===
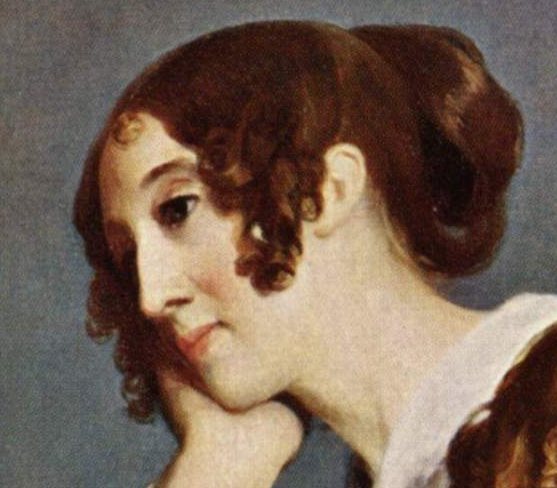
Hairstyle of 1840

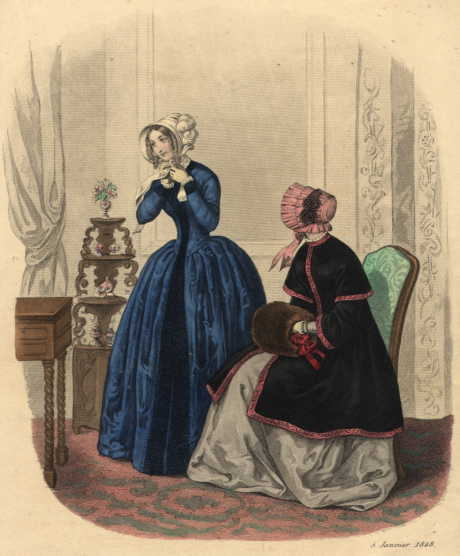
1848 fashion plate shows bonnets and winter-wear.

The wide hairstyles of the previous decade gave way to fashions which kept the hair closer to the head, and the high bun or knot on the crown descended to the back of the head. Hair was still generally parted in the center. Isolated long curls dangling down towards the front (sometimes called "spaniel curls") were worn, often without much relationship to the way that the rest of the hair was styled. Alternately the side hair could be smoothed back over the ears or looped and braided, with the ends tucked into the bun at the back.

Linen caps with frills, lace, and ribbons were worn by married women indoors, especially for daywear. These could also be worn in the garden with a parasol.

Bonnets for street wear were smaller than in the previous decade, and were less heavily decorated. The decorations that did adorn bonnets included flowers on the inside brim or a veil that could be draped over the face. Married women wore their caps under their bonnets. The crown and brim of the bonnet created a horizontal line and when tied under the chin, the brim created a nice frame around the face. This style was also often called the "coal-scuttle" bonnet because of its resemblance to the metals scoops used to shovel coal into furnaces.

For evening, feathers, pearls, lace, or ribbons were worn in the hair. There was also a small brimless bonnet worn with the ribbon untied at the nape of the neck.

=== Outerwear ===
With the narrow, sloping shoulder line of the 1840s, the shawl returned to fashion, where it would remain through the 1860s. It was now generally square and worn folded on the diagonal.

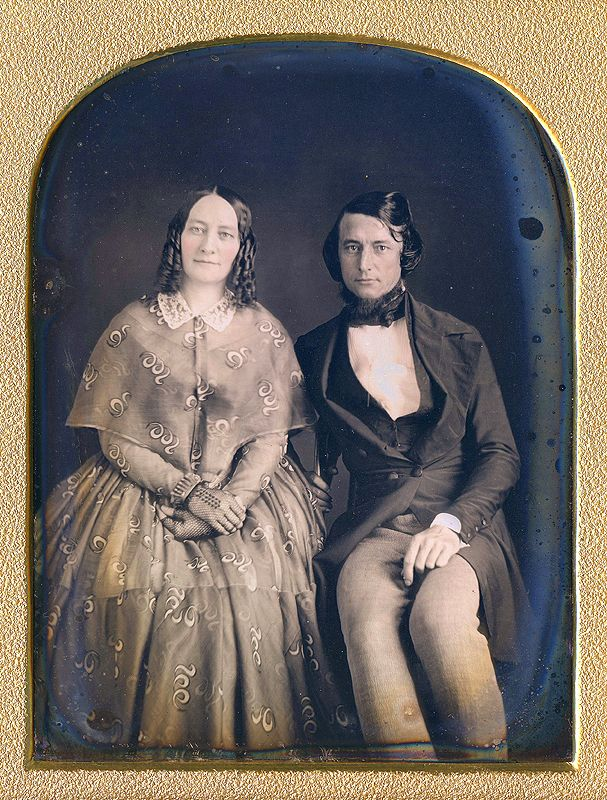
A daguerreotype of a Victorian couple from the 1840s showing a pelerine

Riding habits consisted of a high-necked, tight-waisted jacket with long snug sleeves, worn over a tall-collared shirt or chemisette, with a long matching petticoat or skirt. Contrasting waistcoats or vests cut like those worn by men were briefly popular. Tall hats or broad-brimmed hats like those worn by men were worn.

With the new narrower sleeves, coats and jackets returned to fashion. These were generally knee-length with a cape-like collar. Ankle-length cloaks with cape-collars to cover slits for the arms were worn in cold or wet weather. Ermine muffs with attached handkerchiefs were worn to keep hands warm and be fashionable.

The pelerine was a popular name for wide, capelike collars that extended over the shoulders and covered the upper chest. Sometimes they had layers of tiered fabric, long front panels hanging down from center front, or were also belted at the natural waistline.

The mantlet was a general name for any small cape worn as outerwear.

=== Style gallery — 1840–1844 ===
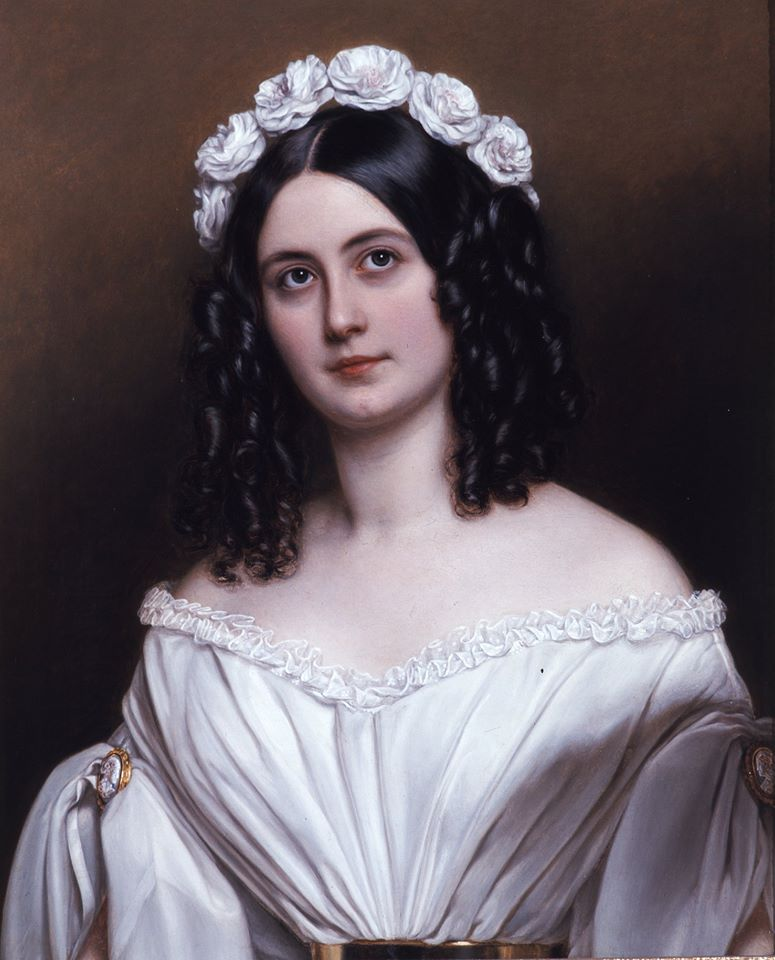
1 – c. 1840

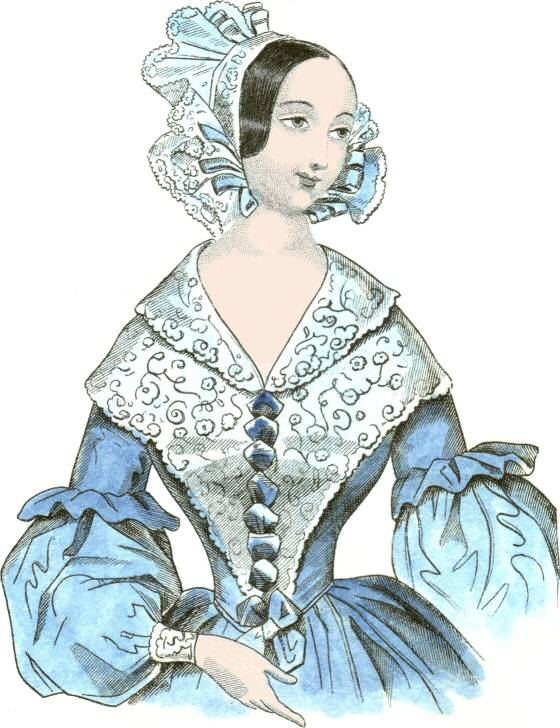
2 – 1841

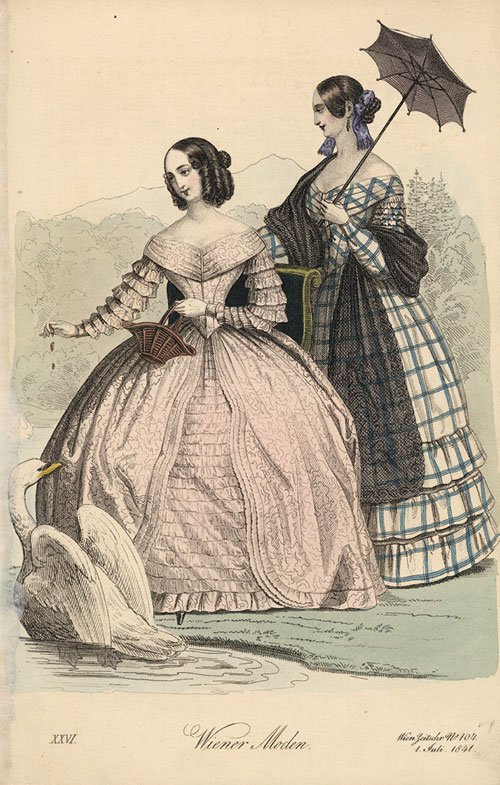
3 – 1841

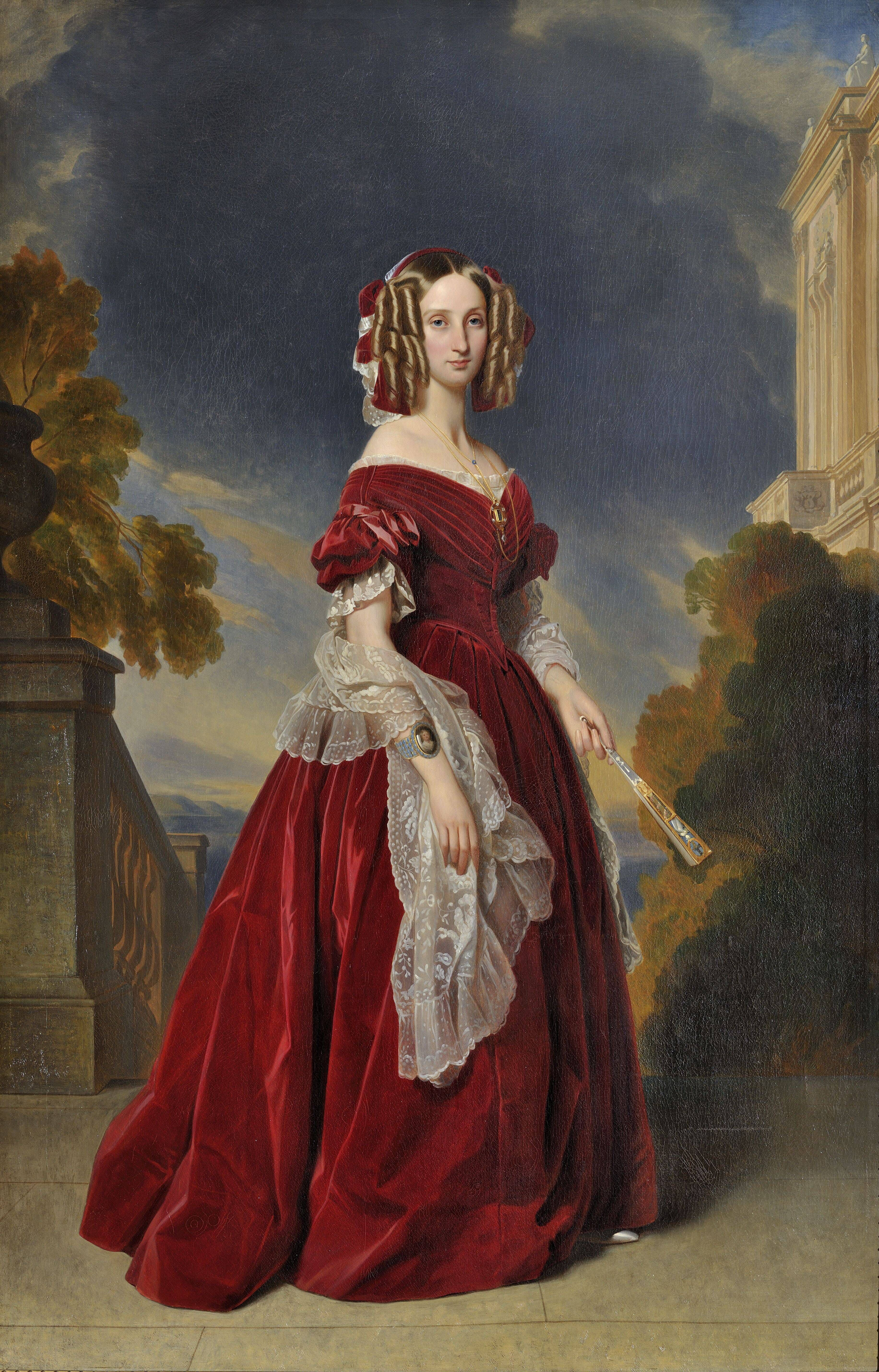
4 – 1841

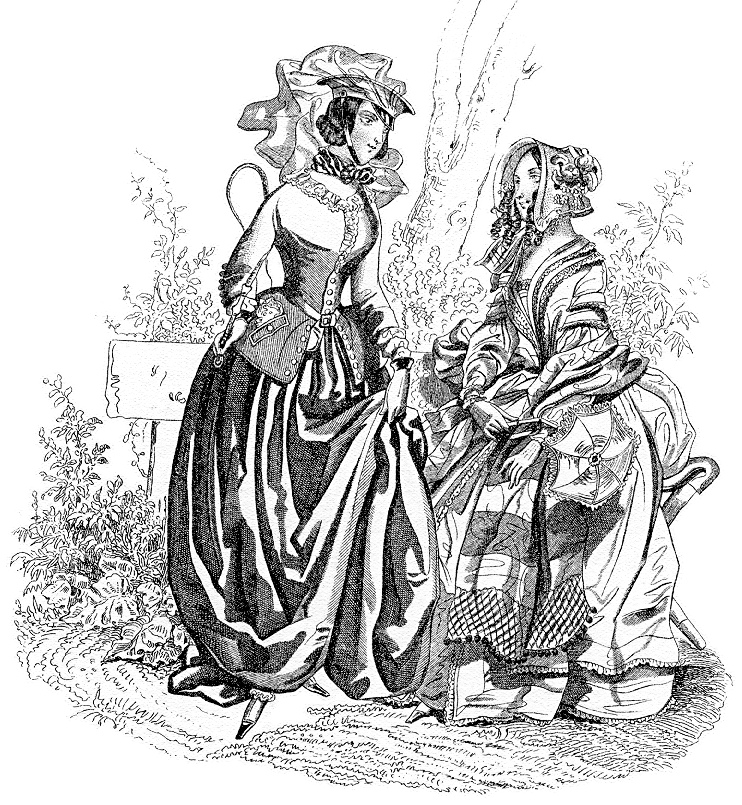
5 – 1842

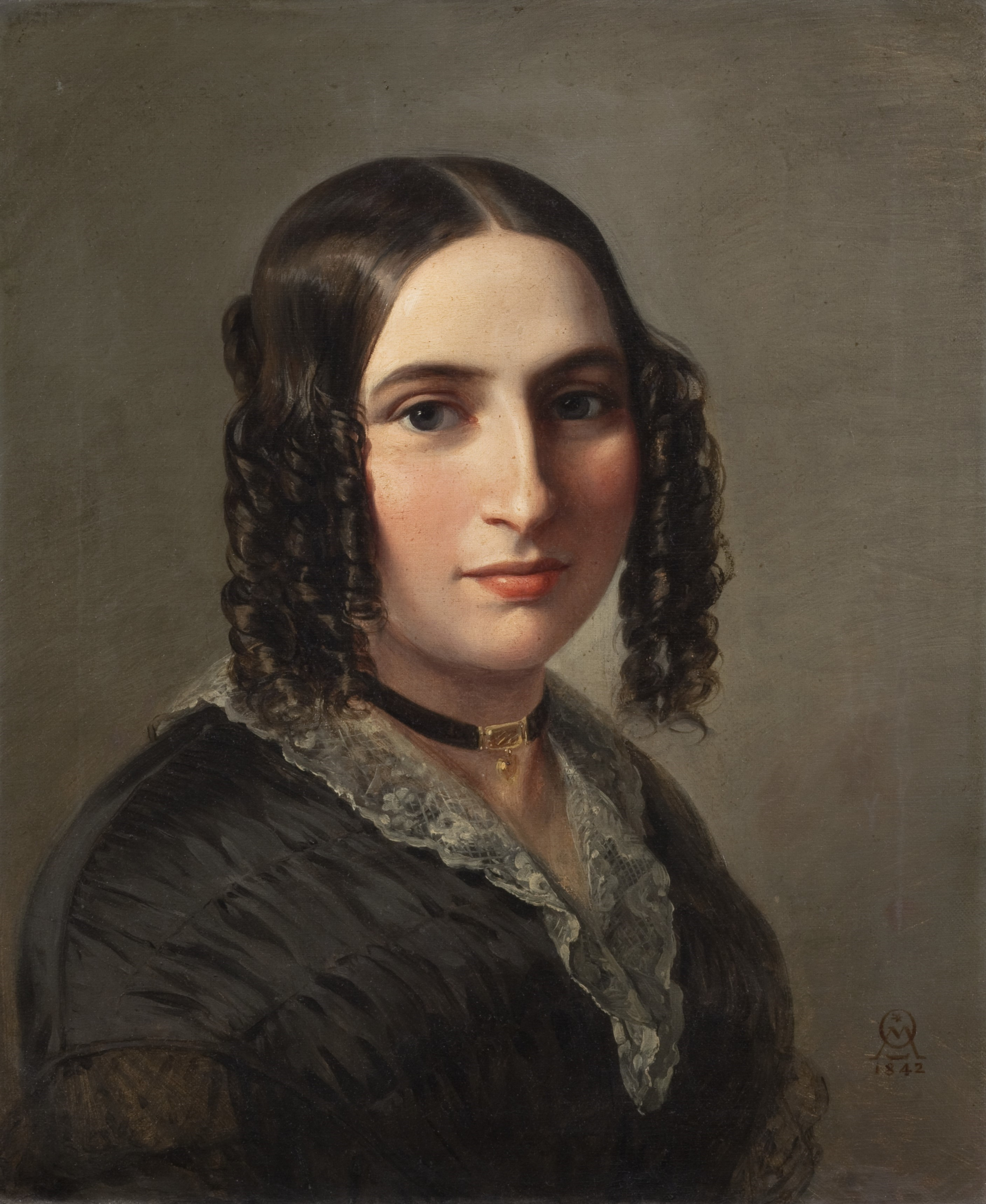
6 – 1842

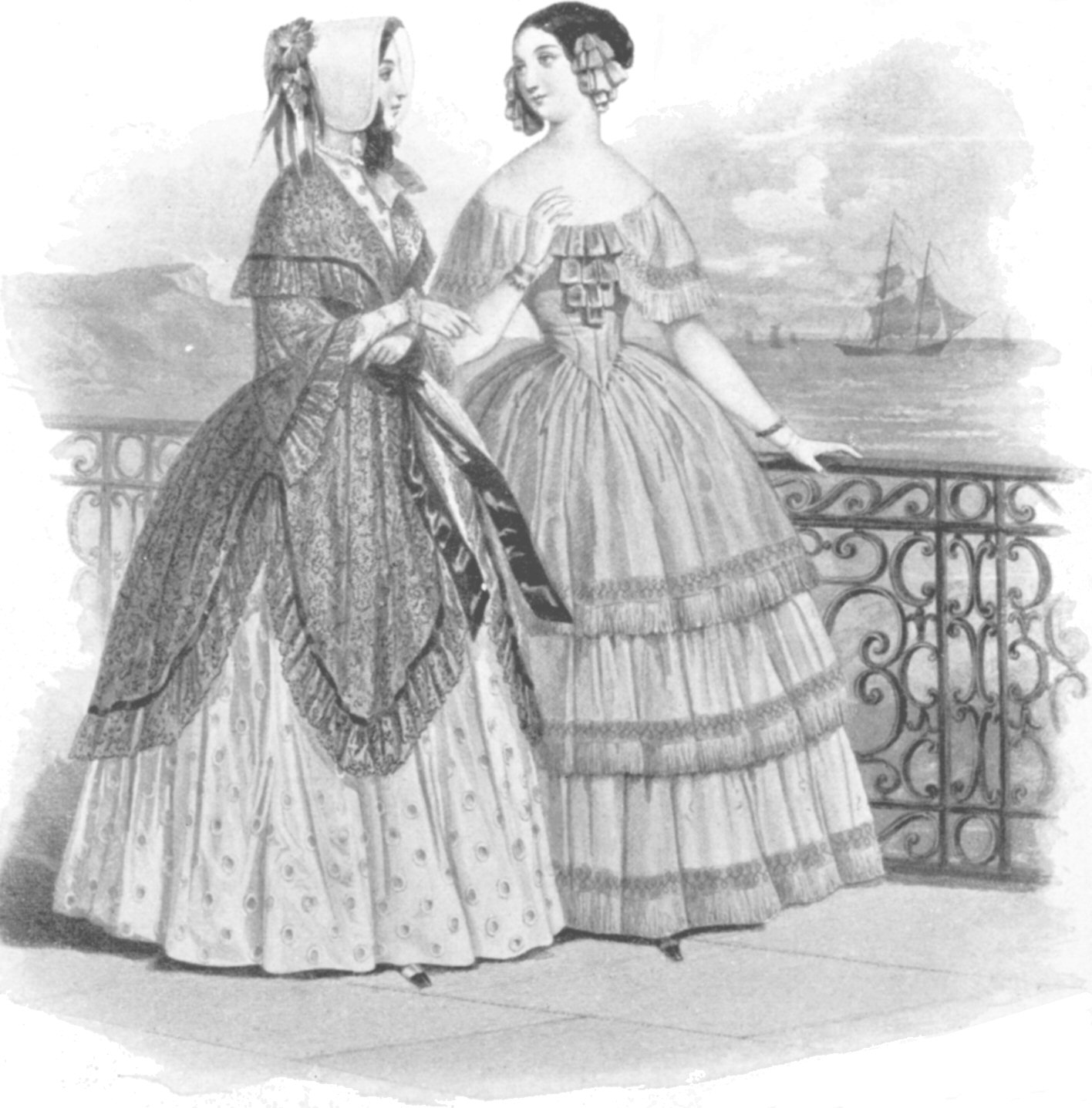
7 – 1844

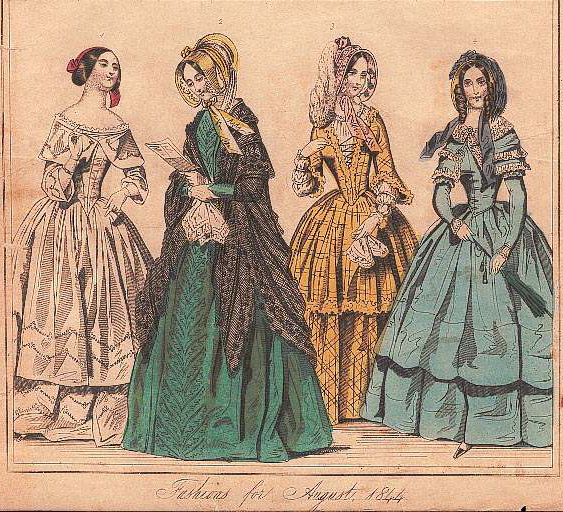
8 – 1844

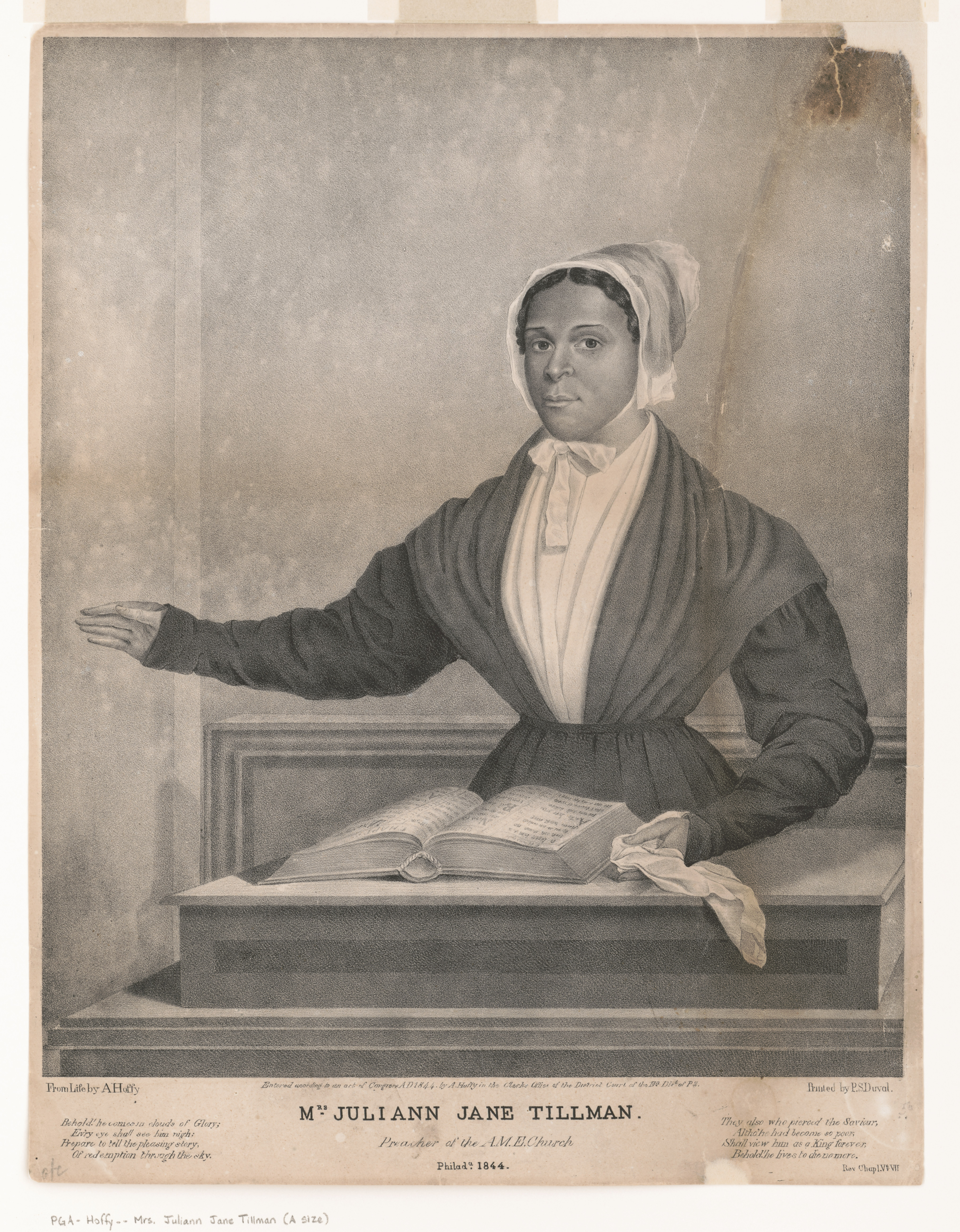
9 – 1844
1. Rosalie Julie von Bonar, c. 1840. The fullness at the shoulder has moved down the arm, and although the dress is still belted in the 1830s manner, the fabric is gathered in to accentuate the V-shaped front rather than the breadth of the shoulders. This is an early image of hair worn in cascades of curls or ringlets.
2. 1841 fashion plate shows lower sleeve fullness, triangular or V-shaped emphasis in the bodice, and a sloping shoulder line. The indoor cap is trimmed with ribbon loops and frills.
3. Viennese summer fashions for 1841 feature pleated panels at the breast and sloping shoulder over long sleeves. The waist is narrow and slightly pointed, and skirts are bell-shaped.
4. Marie-Louise, Queen of the Belgians wears a red velvet gown with a pointed waist. Her hair is worn in a mass of sausage curls, 1841.
5. A fashion plate from La Mode which seems to play up the contrast between a menswear-influenced riding habit and more ordinary high fashion.
6. Fanny Mendelssohn wears the V-neckline, sloped shoulder, and cascades of side curls fashionable in 1842.
7. Fashion plate from Le Moniteur de la Mode. Morning dress (left) with cape-collared jacket and evening gown (right).
8. Dresses of August 1844 show detail on lower sleeves. The dress on the left is an evening style.
9. African-American preacher Juliann Jane Tillman, 1844.

=== Style gallery — 1845–1849 ===
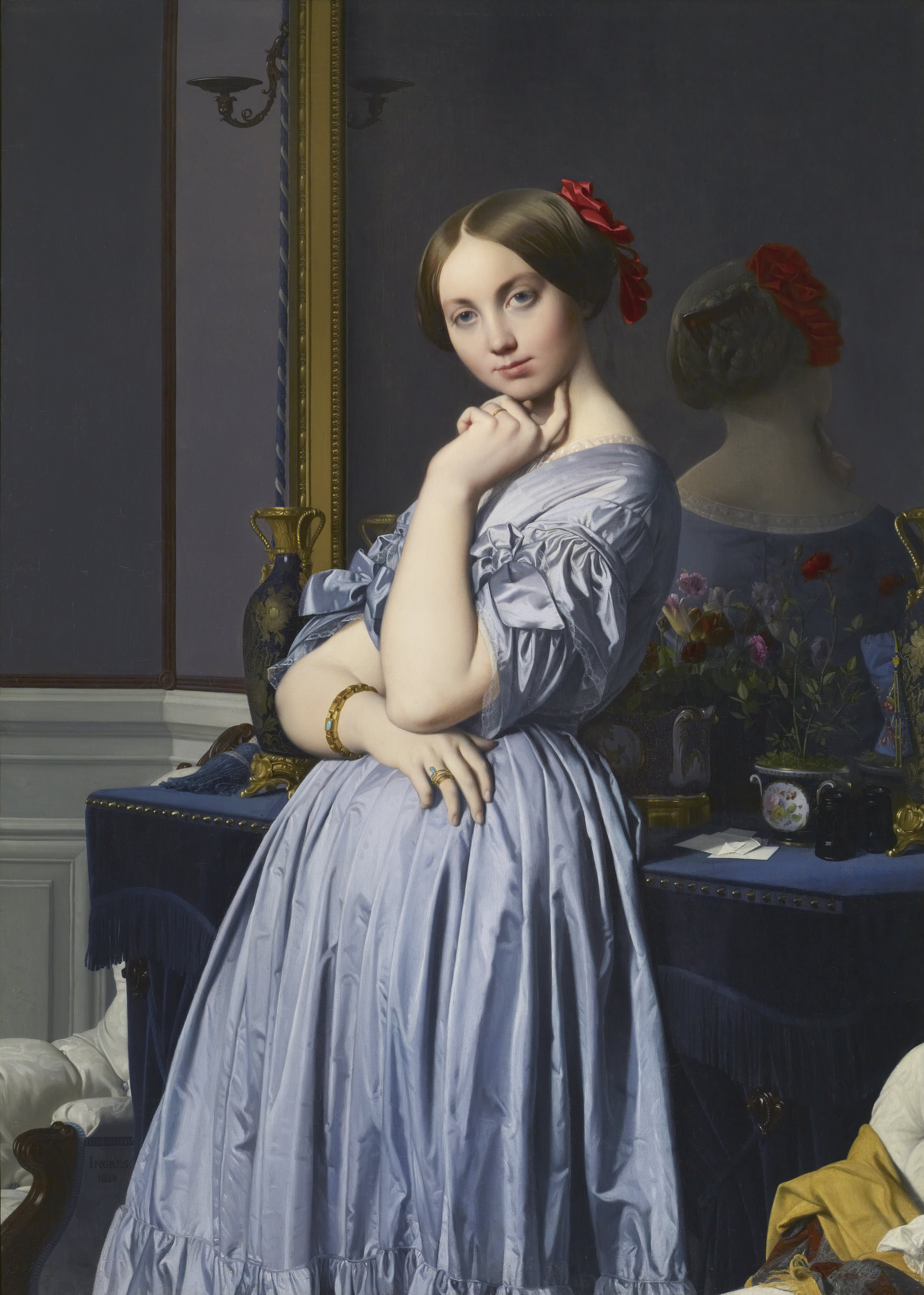
1 – 1845

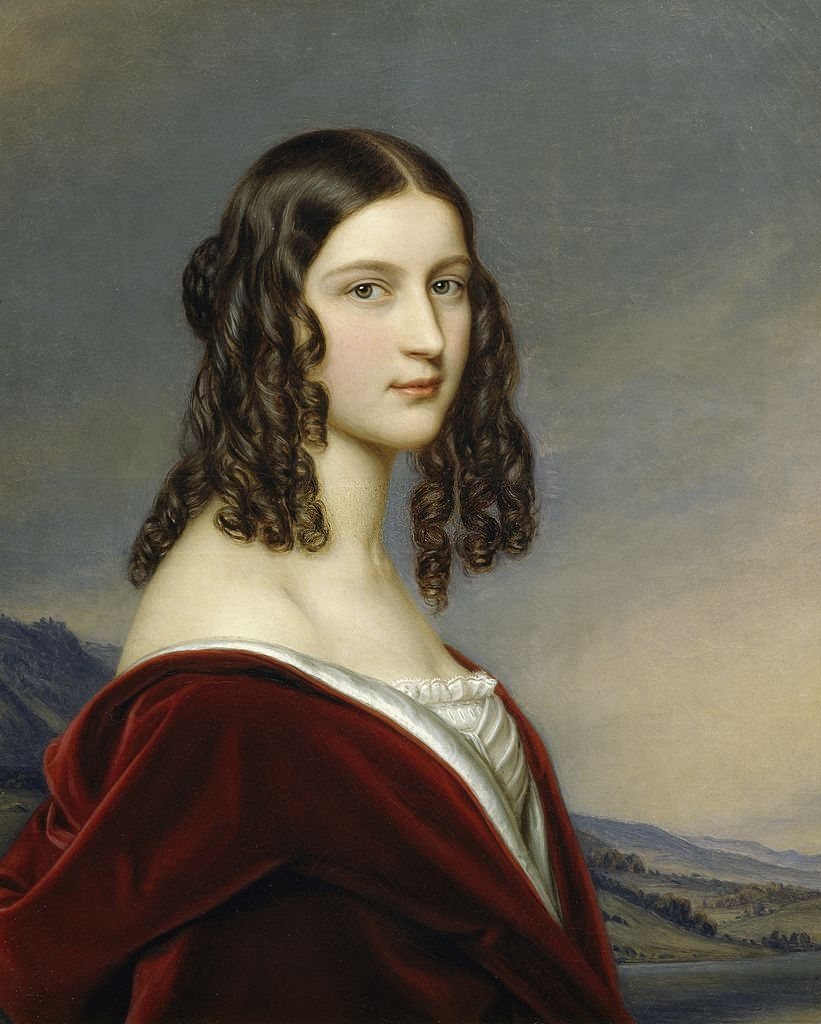
2 – c. 1845

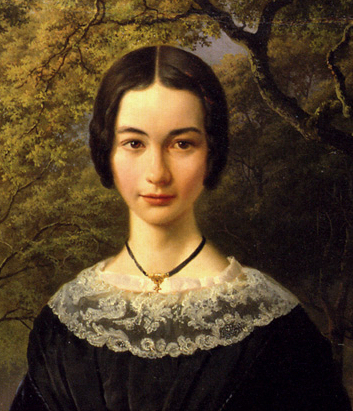
3 – 1846

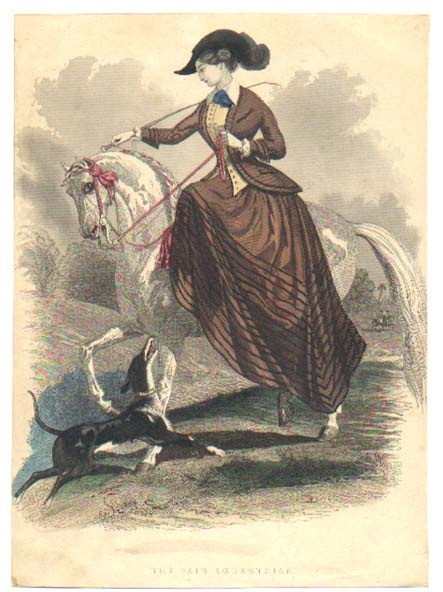
4 – c. 1847

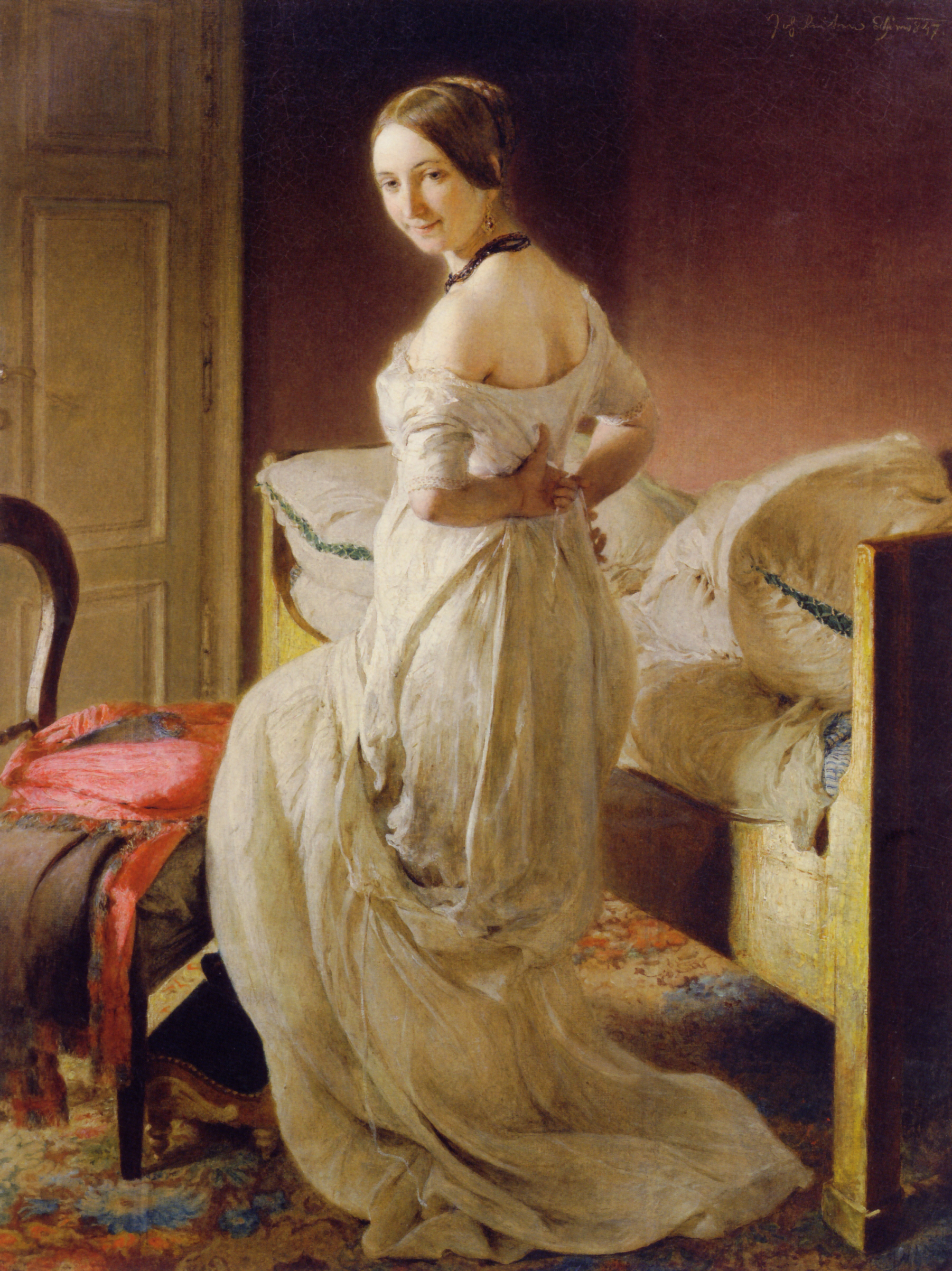
5 – 1847

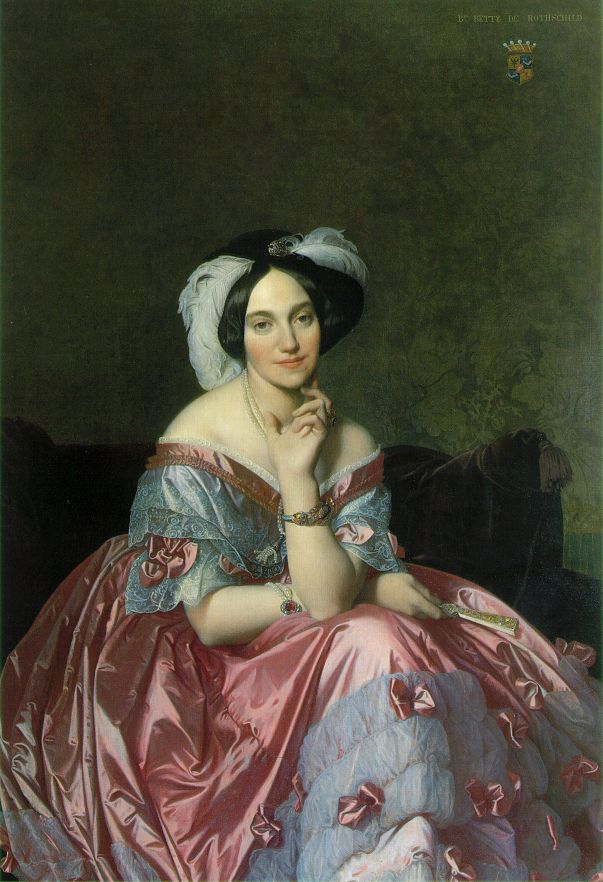
6 – 1848

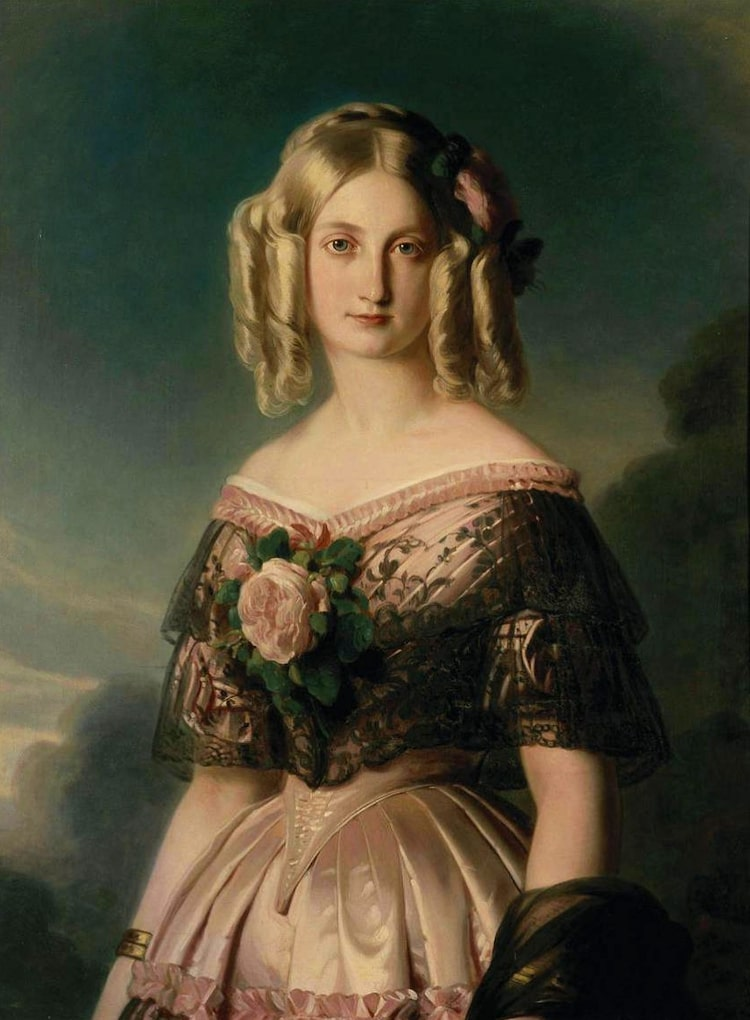
7 – 1848

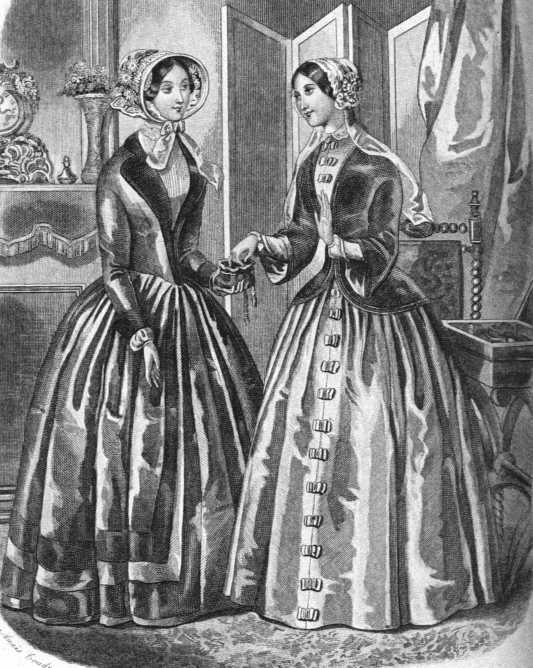
8 – 1849
1. Countess d'Haussonville wears her hair parted in the center and smoothed over her ears.
2. Friederike von Gumppenberg, with a central part, long sausage curls, and a bun on the back of the crown, is a fashionably romantic echo of mid-seventeenth century styles. This style would remain popular into the next decade. German, c. 1845.
3. Young lady of Holland wears a lace collar and ruffled chemise or chemisette with her dark dress.
4. Fashion plate of a riding habit c. 1847 features a cutaway jacket over a contrasting waistcoat and shirt with a stiff turned-down collar. The lady wears a dashing plumed hat.
5. Underwear of 1847: This woman is unlacing her corset, having stepped out of her petticoats. Her chemise is knee-length, with sleeves ending just above the elbow.
6. Baroness Rothschild wears a pink satin gown with rows of ruching at the hem and lace frills at the collar and sleeves, all trimmed with ribbon bows. Her hair is smoothed over her ears and decorated with ostrich plumes, 1848.
7. In Winterhalter's portrait of 1848, Princess Maria Carolina Augusta of Bourbon-Two Sicilies wears her hair parted in the center and hanging in sausage curls. Her skirt is gathered with wide, flat pleats, and the pleating on her bodice is visible through the black lace.
8. Fashion illustration of 1849. The lady on the left wears a low-waisted morning dress and an outdoor bonnet. The lady on the right wears a short jacket over her dress and a lacey indoor cap.

=== Dresses ===
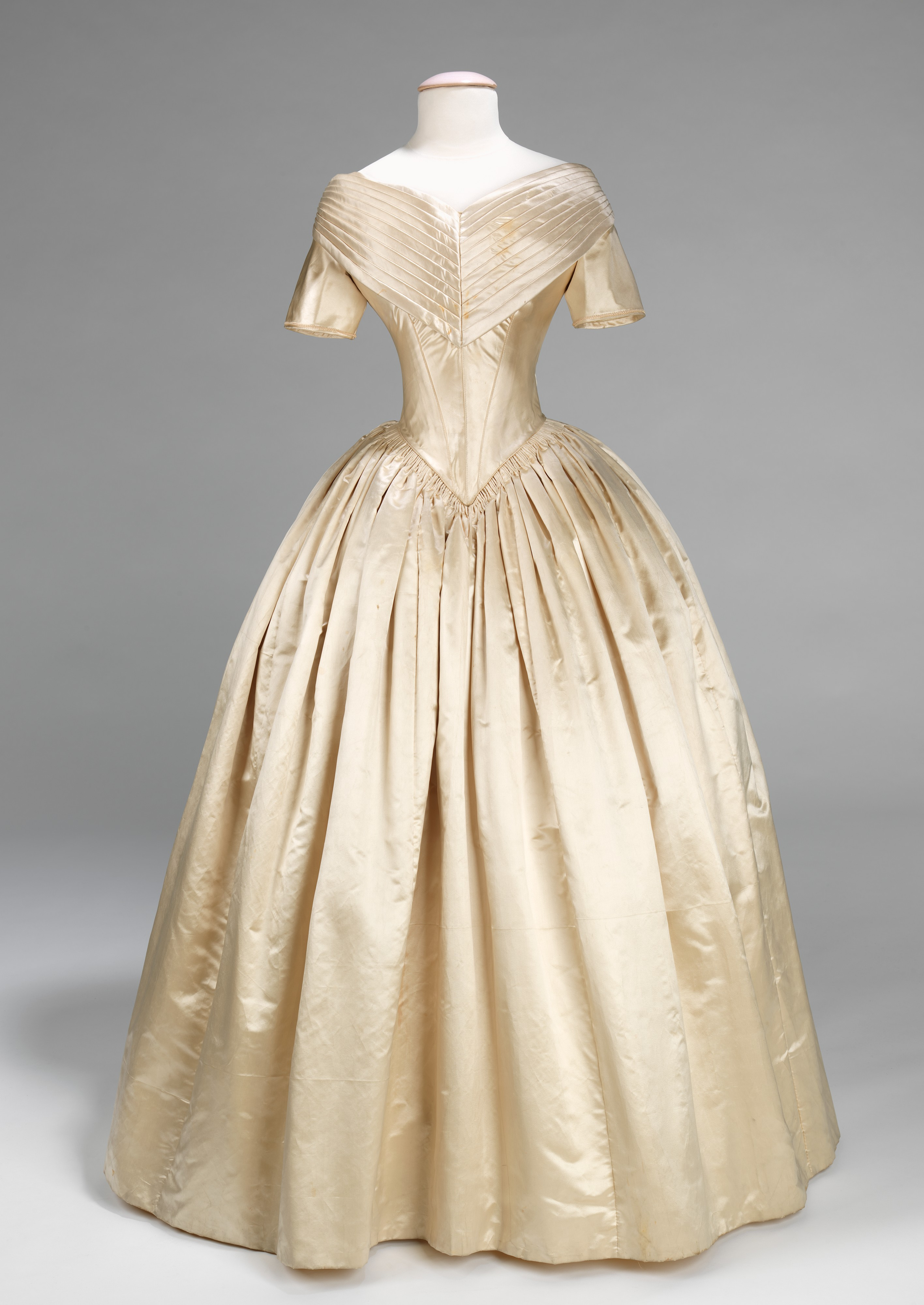
1 - 1842

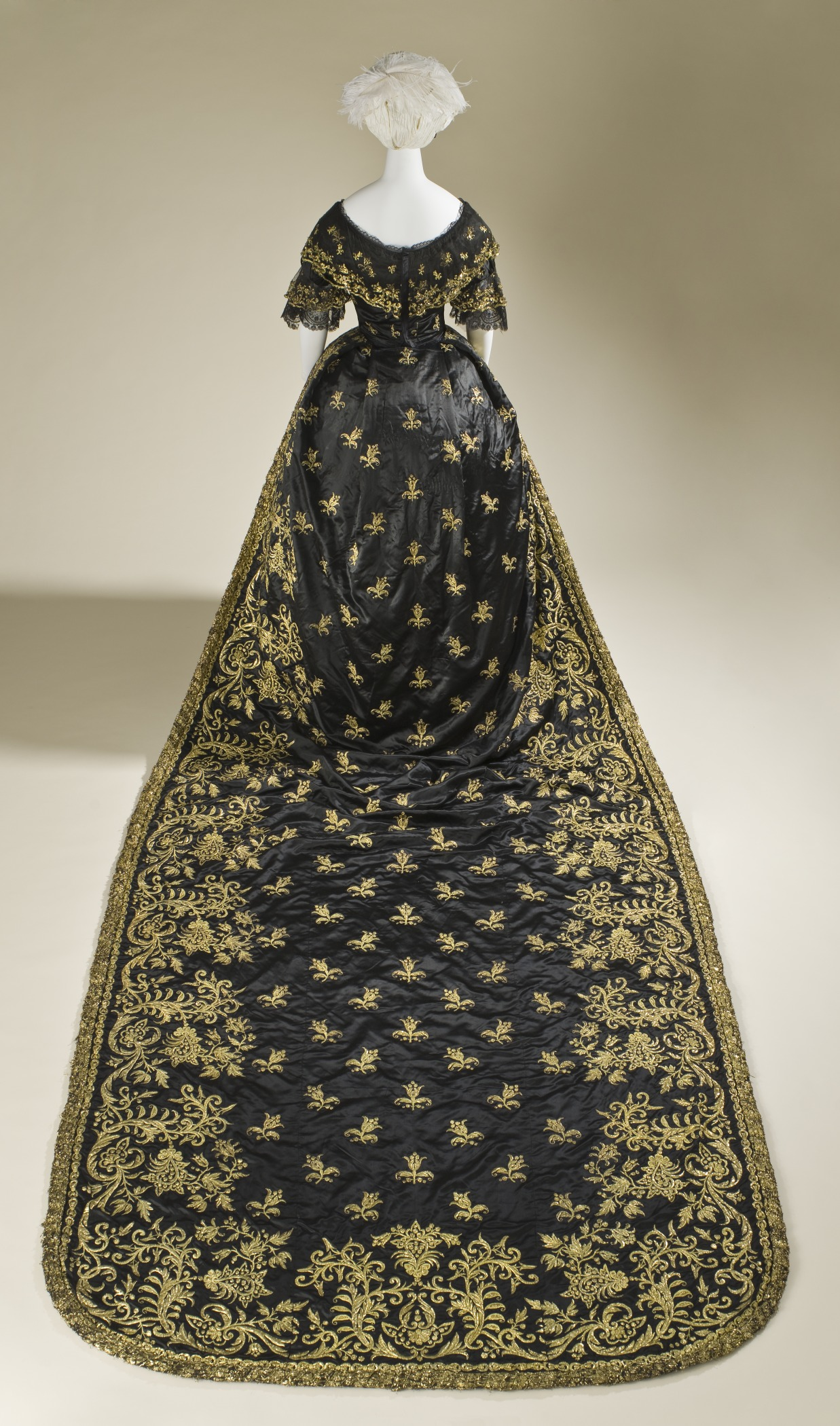
2 - 1840 court dress

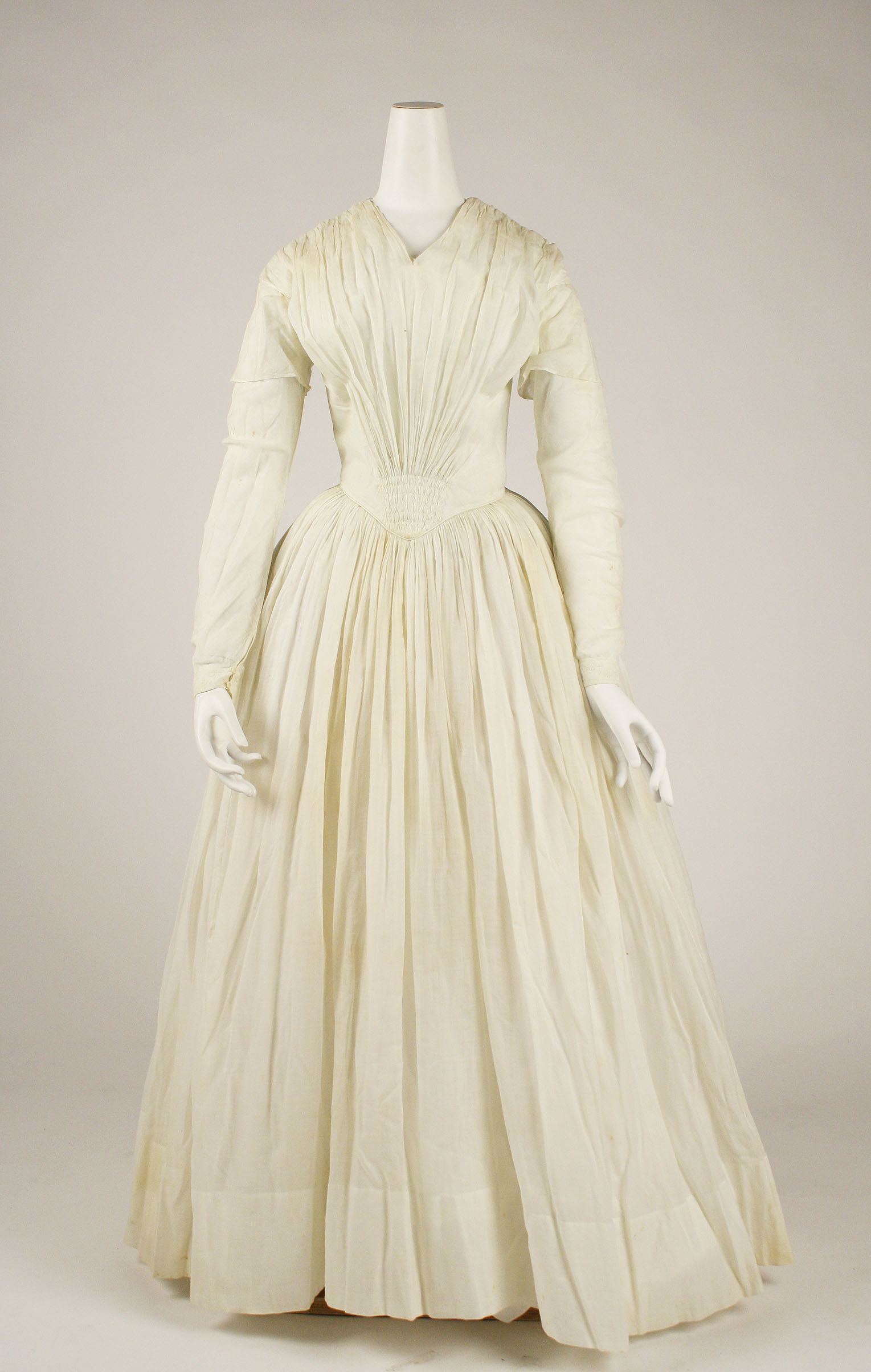
3- 1840

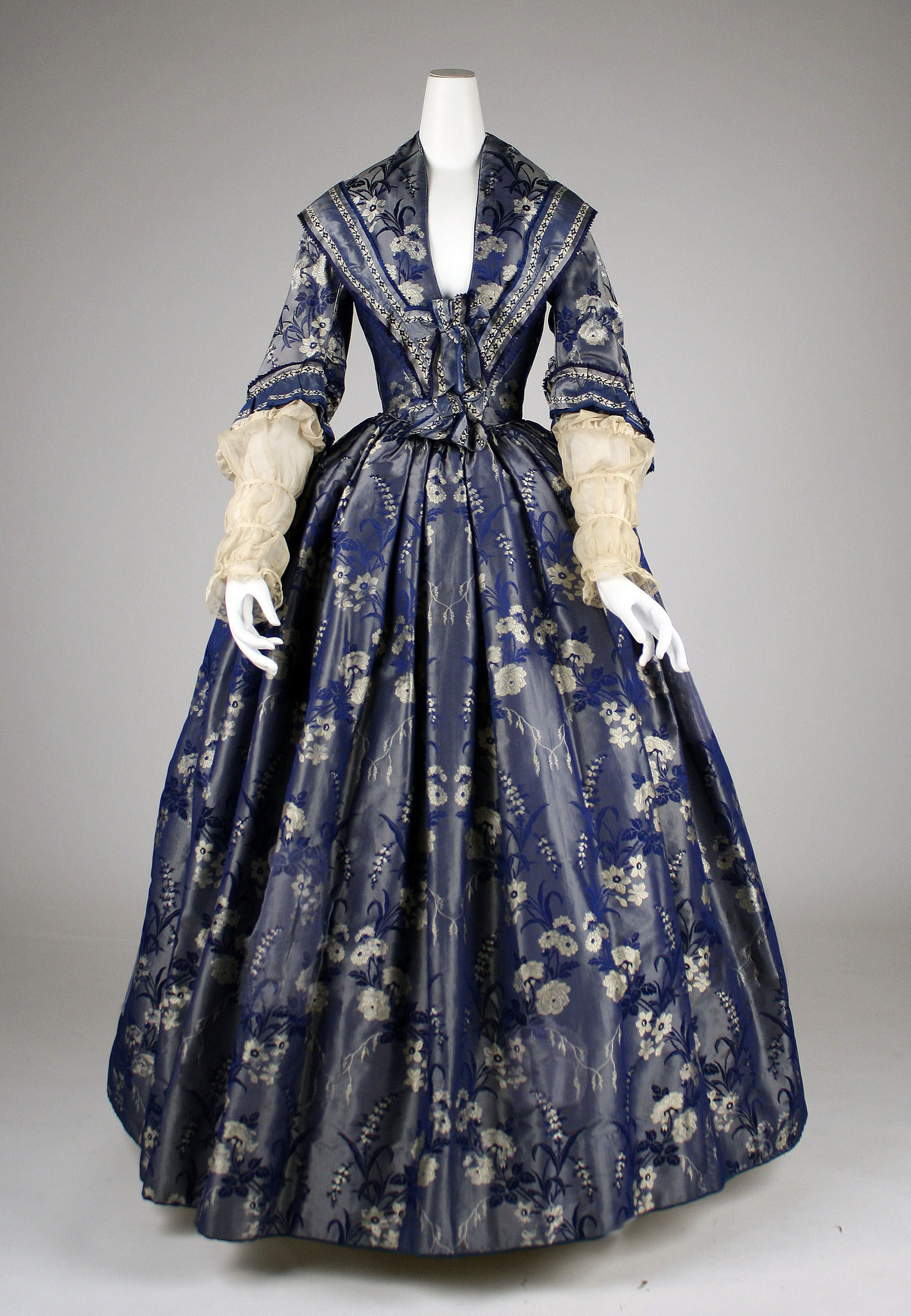
4

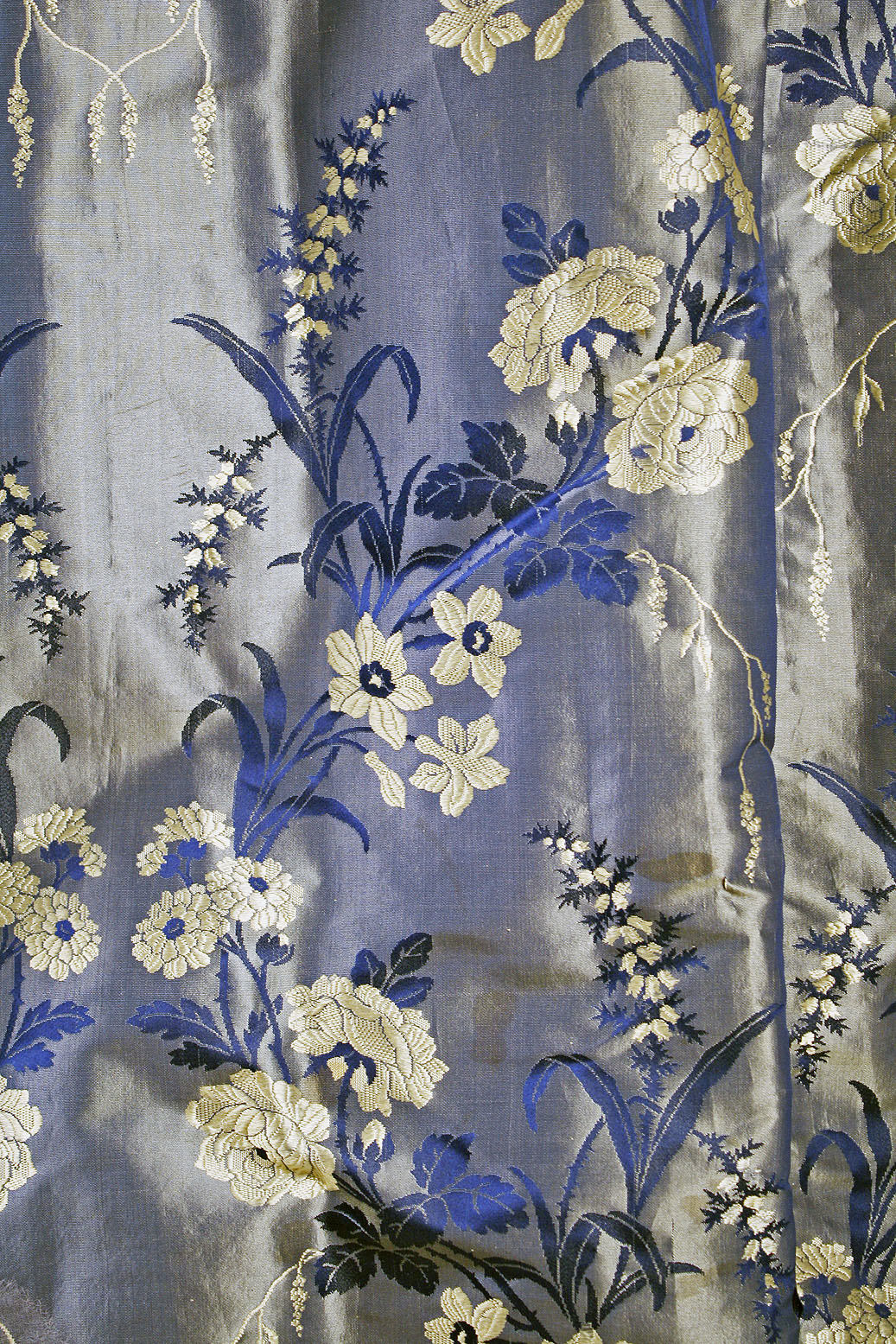
5

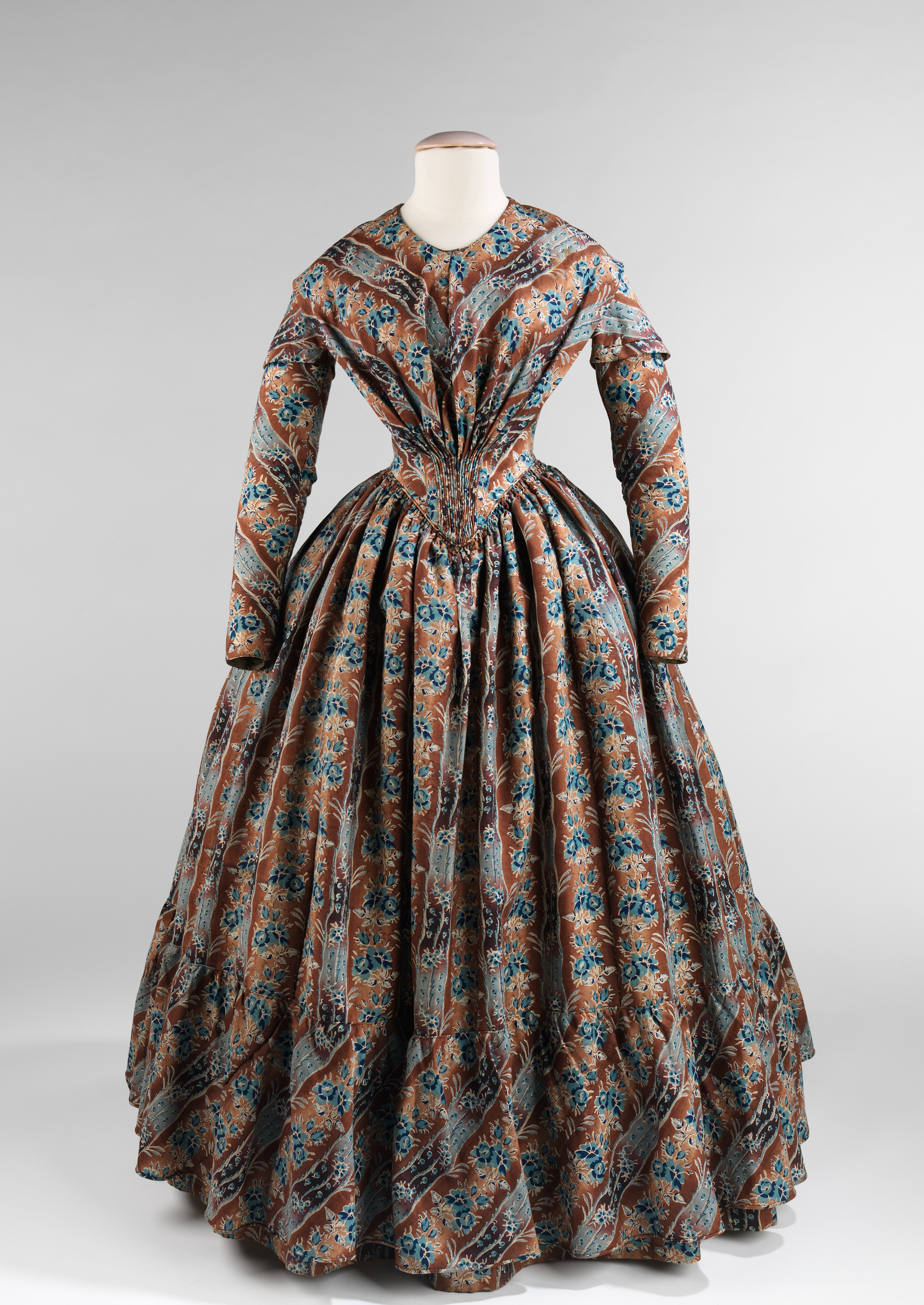
6 - 1840

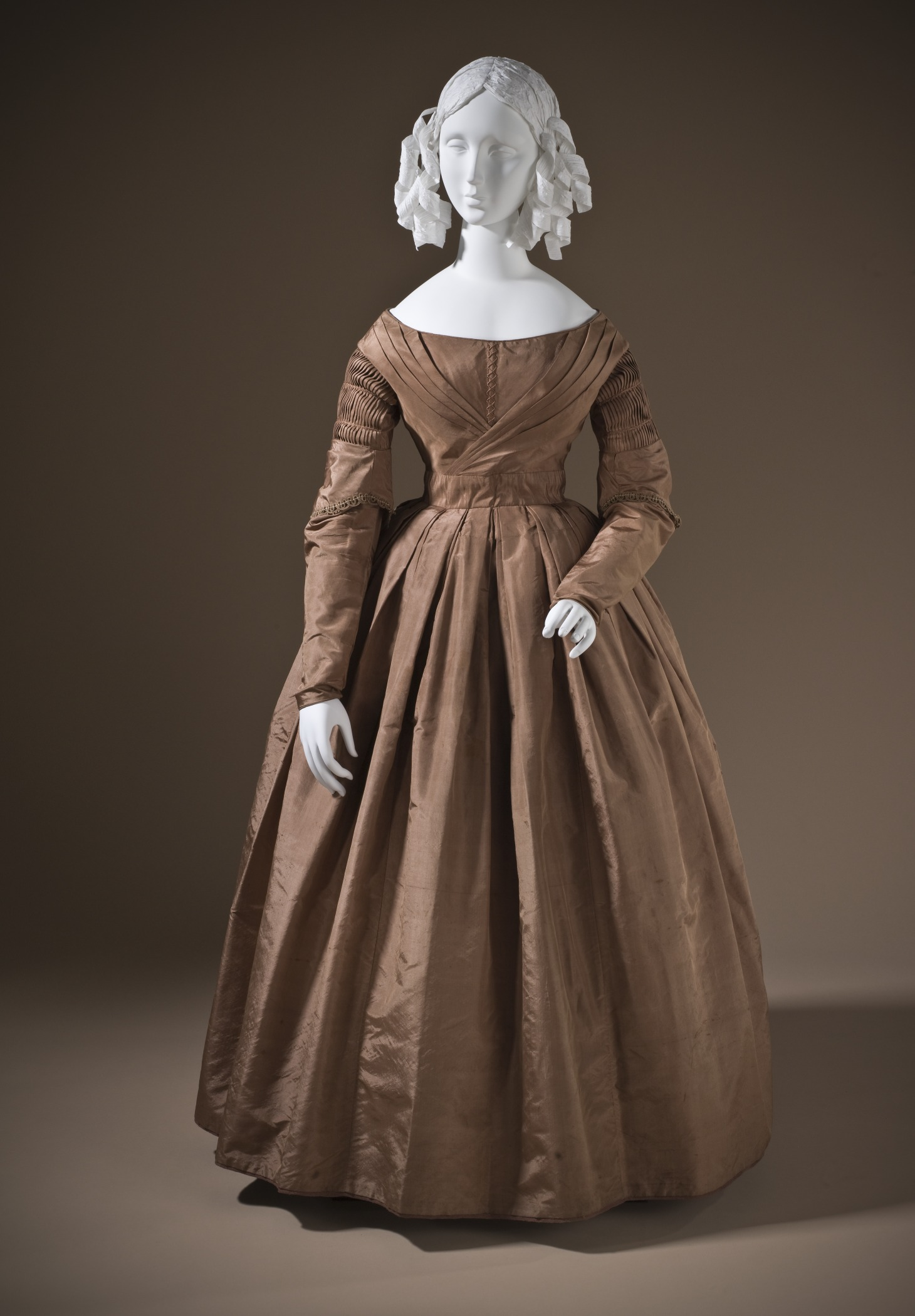
7 - 1840
1. 1842 evening cream-colored dress
2. 1840 court dress
3. 1840 white dress
4. Blue silk dress
5. Dress fabric in detail
6. 1840 dress
7. 1840 dress

=== New Orleans fashion ===
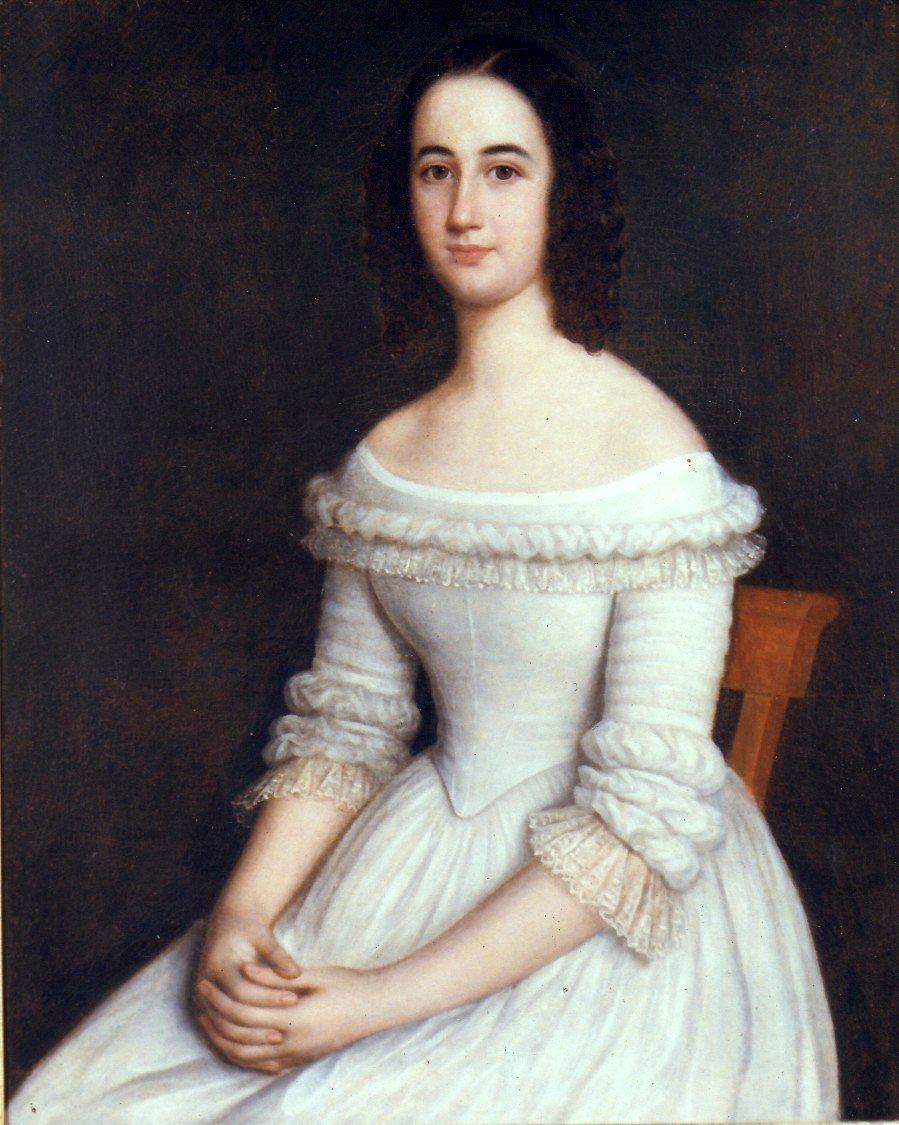

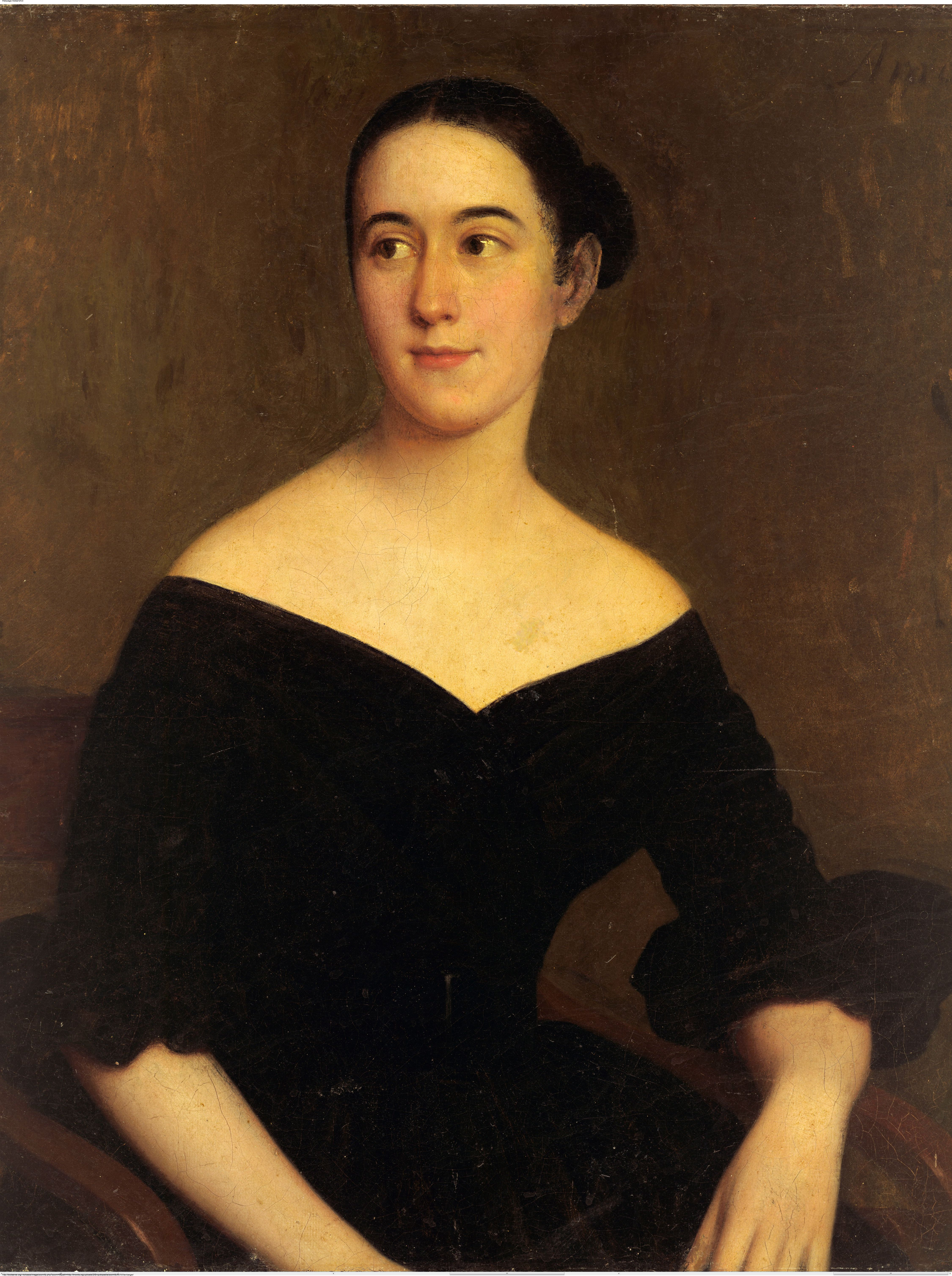
1840 New Orleans

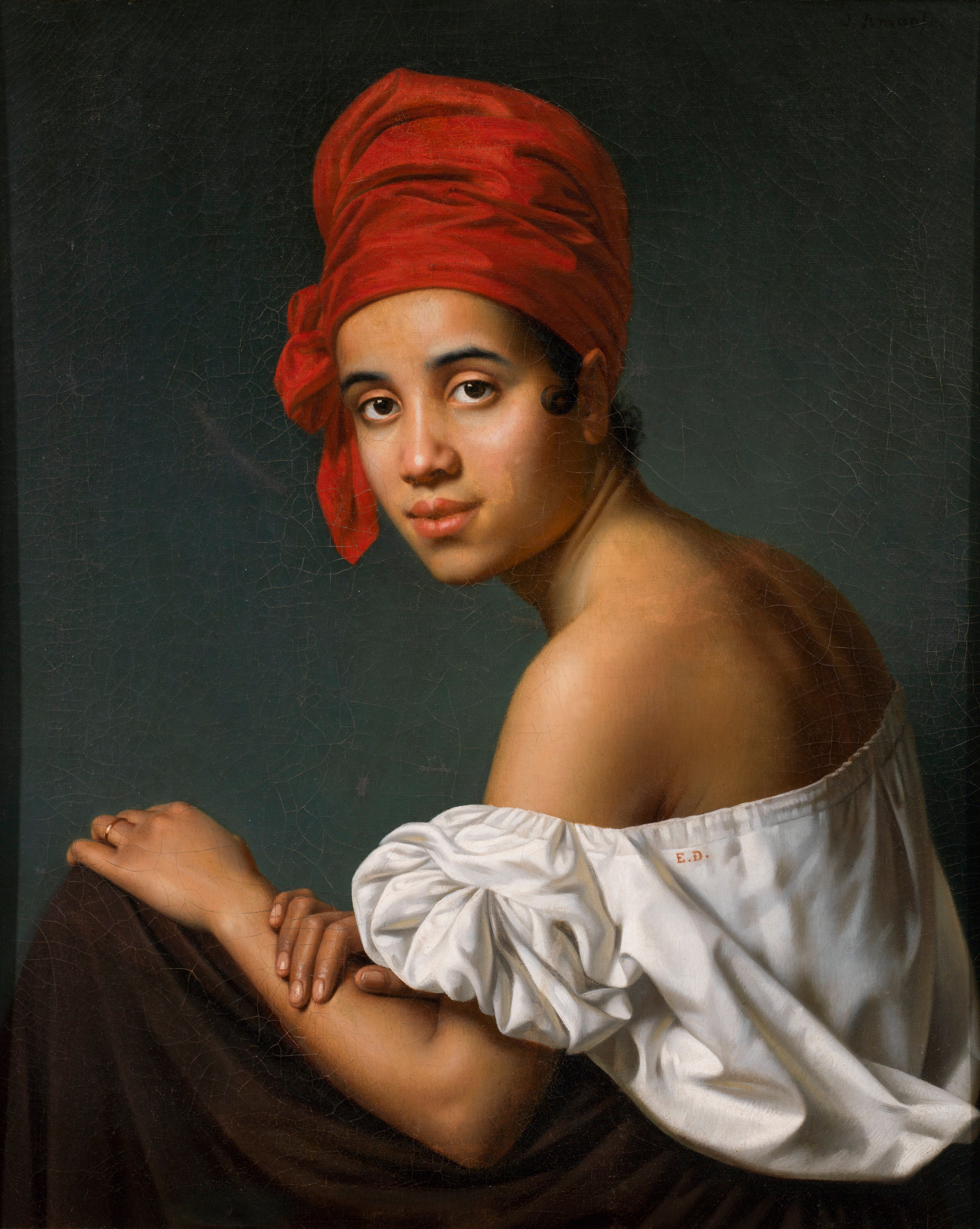
Creole girl

Woman wearing glasses with white dress and pink ribbon

== Men's fashion ==
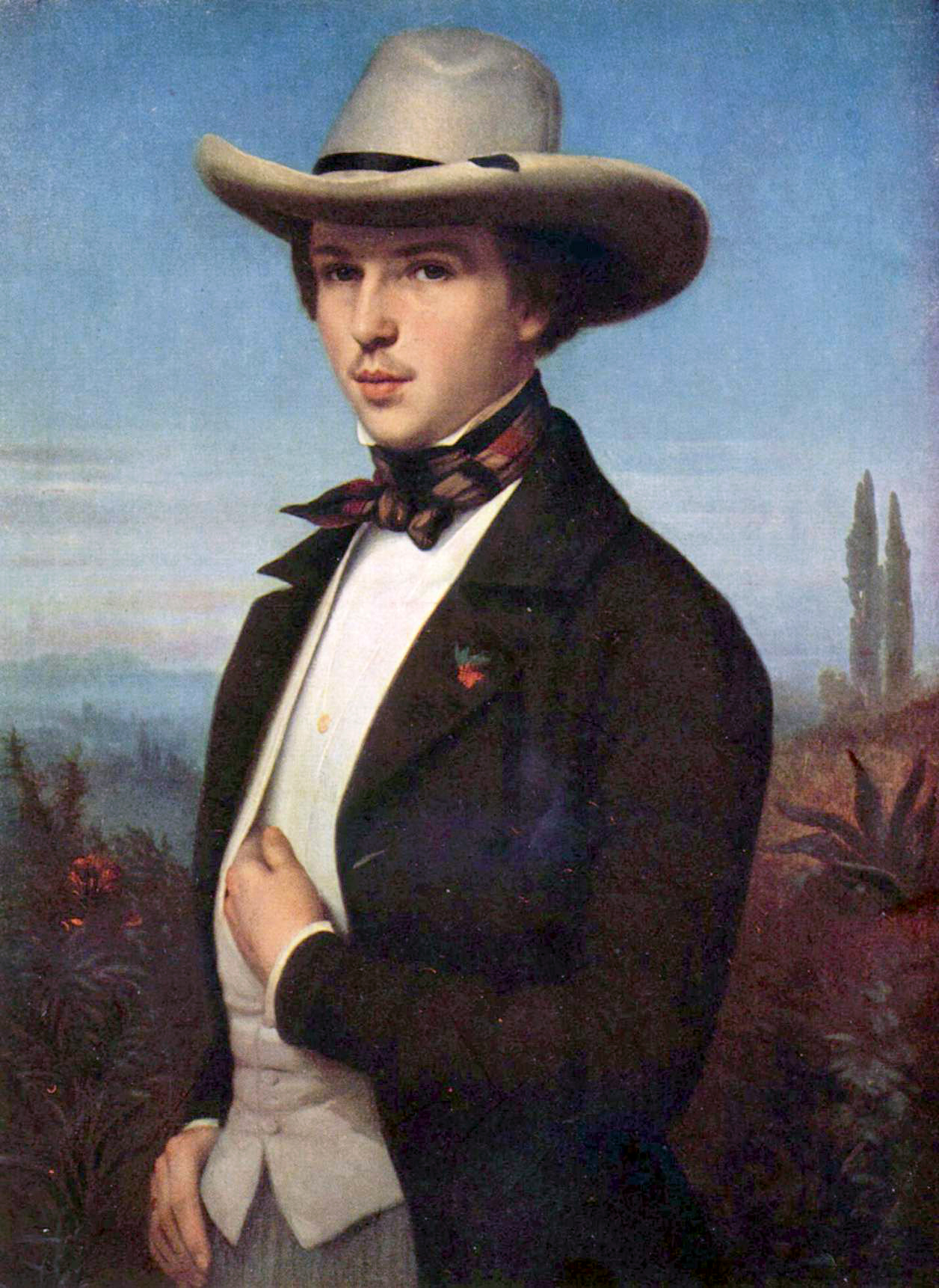
Landscape painter Oswald Achenbach wears a broad-brimmed hat for a painting tour of Italy. He wears a striped ascot and his waistcoat has the rounded chest and lowered waistline of the late 1840s. The waistcoat is finished with two points at the lowered waist and contrasts with both his striped trousers and brown coat. Similar styles were worn in the American West at this time.

=== Overview ===
In this period, men's fashion plates show the lowered waistline taking on a decided point at the front waist, which was accompanied by a full rounded chest. Prince Albert (husband of Queen Victoria) had a high influence on male fashion, primarily because of his young age at the time of his wife's coronation, and his great attention to his appearance. Therefore, the clothing, particularly of upper class gentleman, continued to follow the trend of earlier decades with full shoulders and chest, and a tightly cinched waist.

=== Shirts and cravats ===
Shirts of linen or cotton featured lower standing collars, occasionally turned down, and were worn with wide cravats or neck ties tied in several different ways:

1. Around the neck, knotted in front and puffed up to hide the shirt collar and create a pigeon like neck
2. Similar to the first version but tucked down into the waistcoat
3. Around the neck and knotted into a bow tie
4. The "Osbaldiston", a barrel shape knot under the chin
5. Knotted in a wide pointy bow. Dark cravats were popular for day wear and patterned ones were worn in the country.

At this time, the dickey was introduced, a false shirt-front usually made of satin. It was worn as an "intentionally messy" look.

=== Coats and waistcoats ===
Frock coats (in French redingotes) were worn for informal day wear, were calf length, and might be double-breasted. Shoulders were narrower and slightly sloped. Waistcoats or vests were single- or double-breasted, with shawl or notched collars, and might be finished in double points at the lowered waist.

A cutaway morning coat was worn with light trousers for any formal daytime occasion; eveningwear called for a dark tail coat and trousers.

A frock coat was a tight fitting coat with the front cut up to the waistline, this was for casual wear. A vest replaces the waistcoat at this time, they were still very decorative with no collar. A pardessus for men was a large, black formal cape with a yoke across the shoulder line. A chesterfield coat was a calf-length, fur-lined coat, with a fur collar, cuffs and lapels. There was also no waistline seam.

=== Trousers ===
Full-length trousers had fly fronts. Breeches remained a requirement for formal functions at the British court (as they would be throughout the century). Breeches continued to be worn for horseback riding and other country pursuits, especially in Britain, with tall fitted boots.

=== Hats and hairstyles ===
The crowns of tall hats were straighter than in the previous period, and grew taller on the way to the stovepipe shape of the 1850s. They were essential for formal occasions and in cities.

Wide-brimmed hats were worn outdoors in sunny climates. Curled hair and sideburns remained fashionable, along with mustaches.

=== Style gallery ===
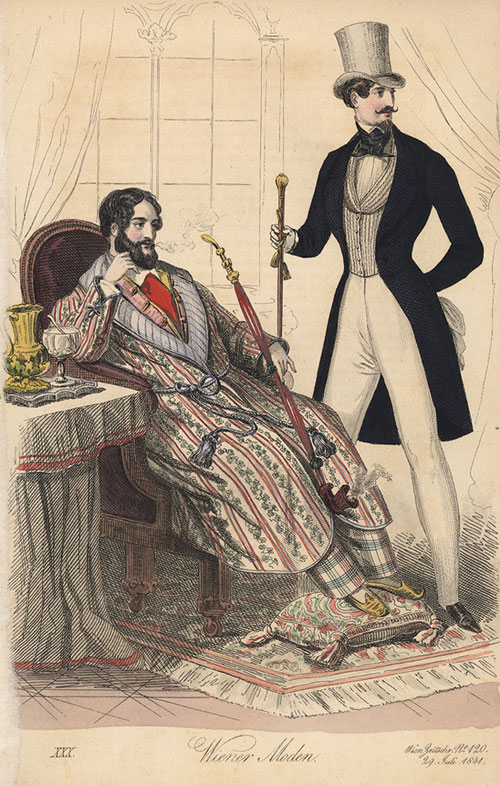
1 – 1841

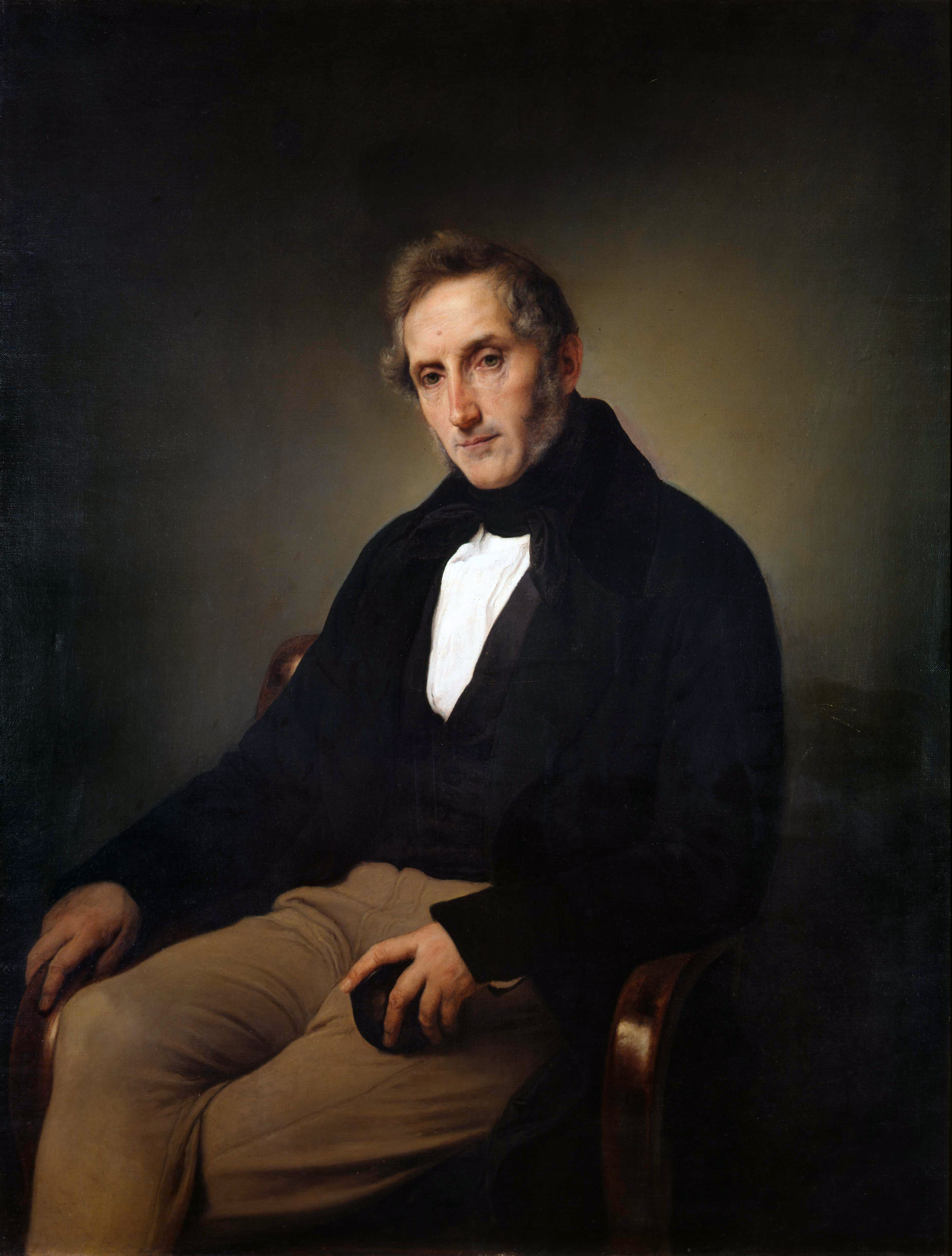
2 – 1841

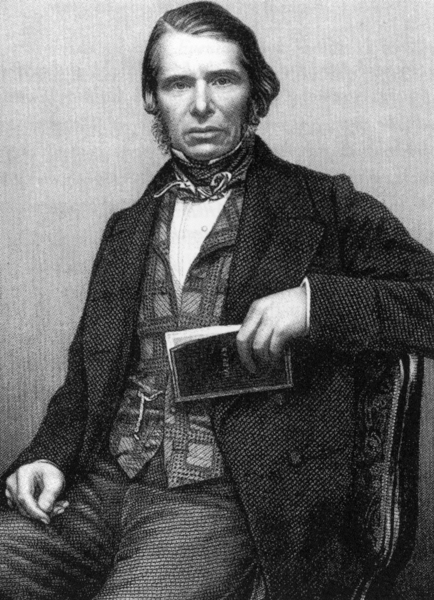
3 – 1840s

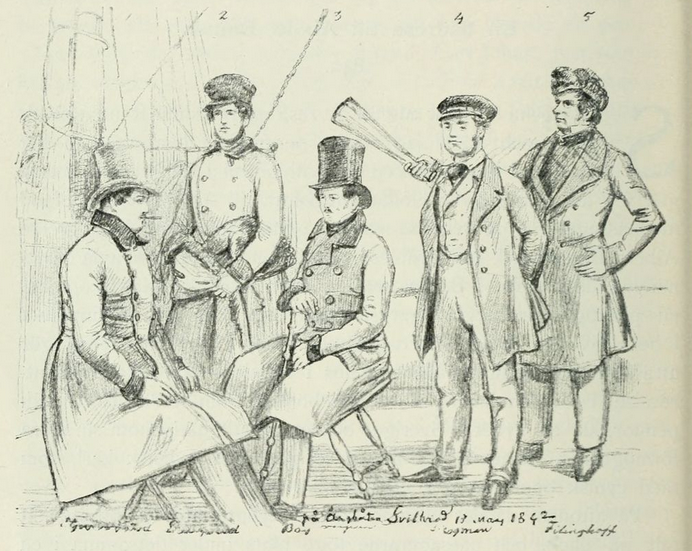
4 – 1842

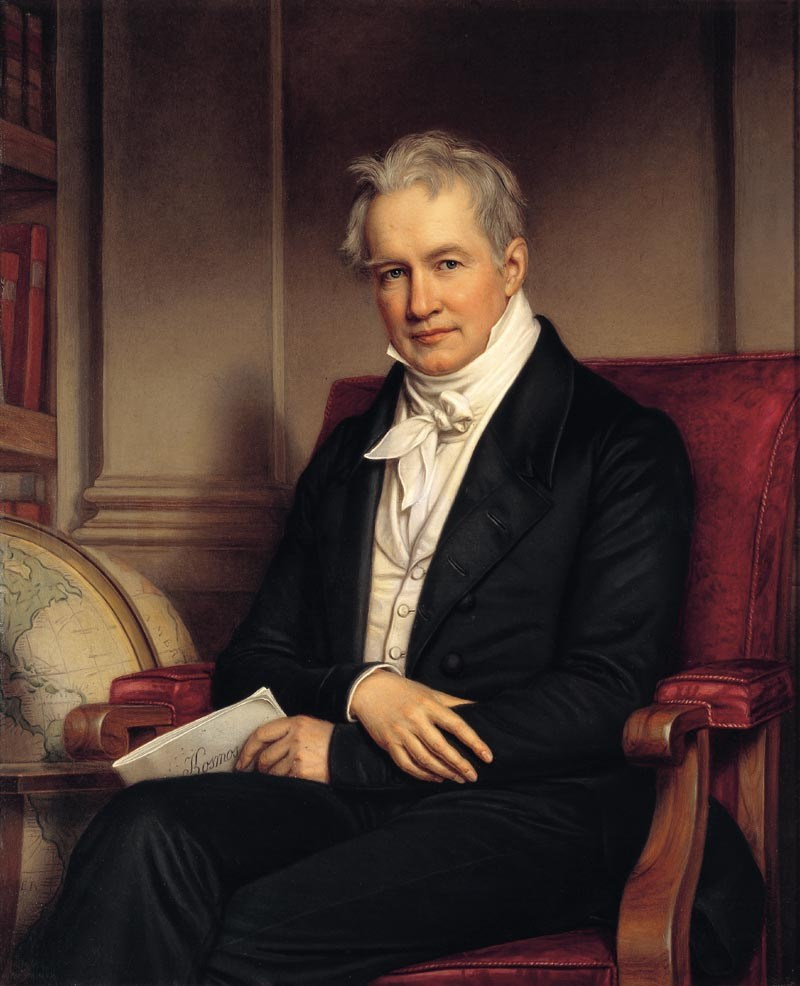
5 - 1843

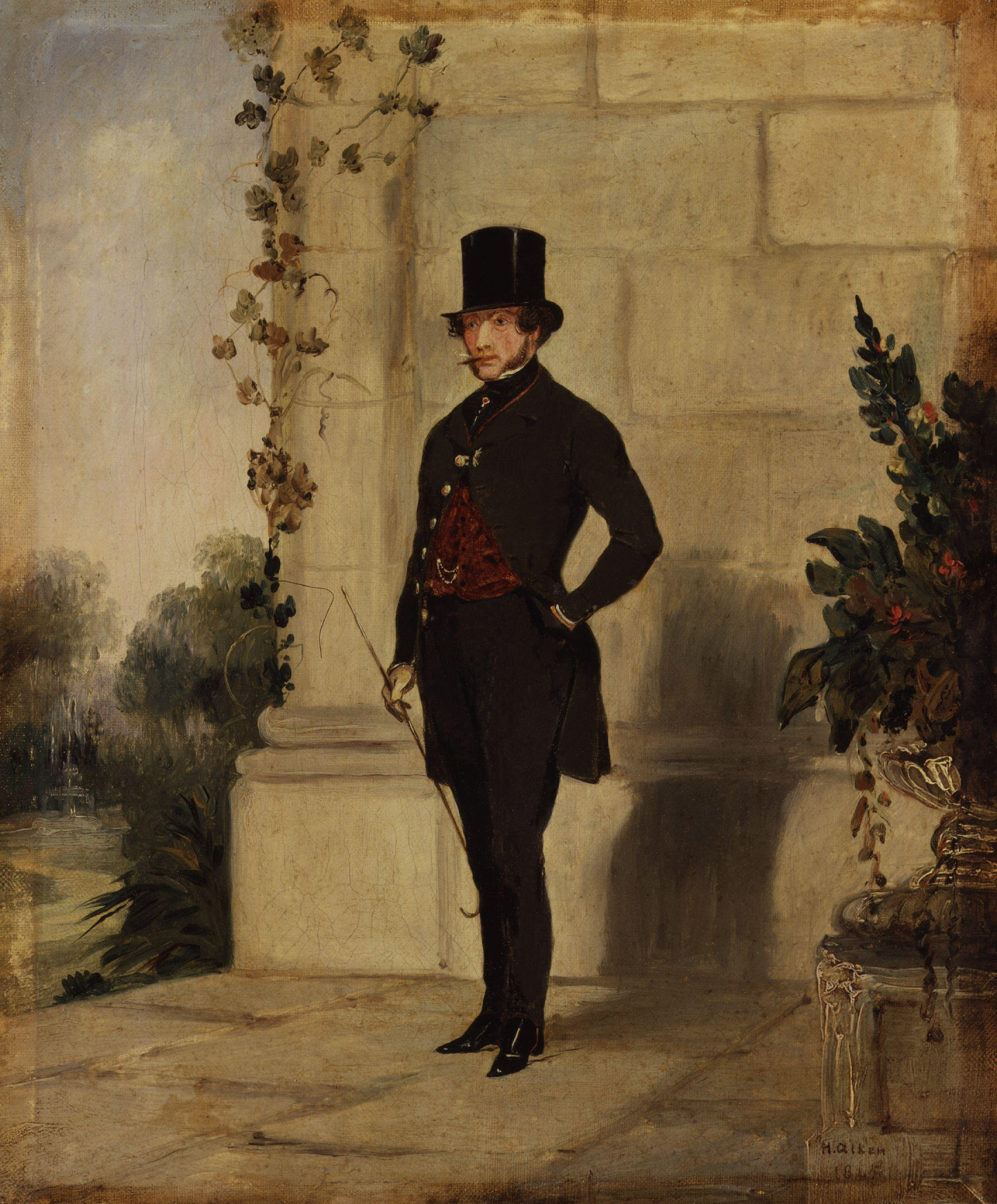
6 – 1845

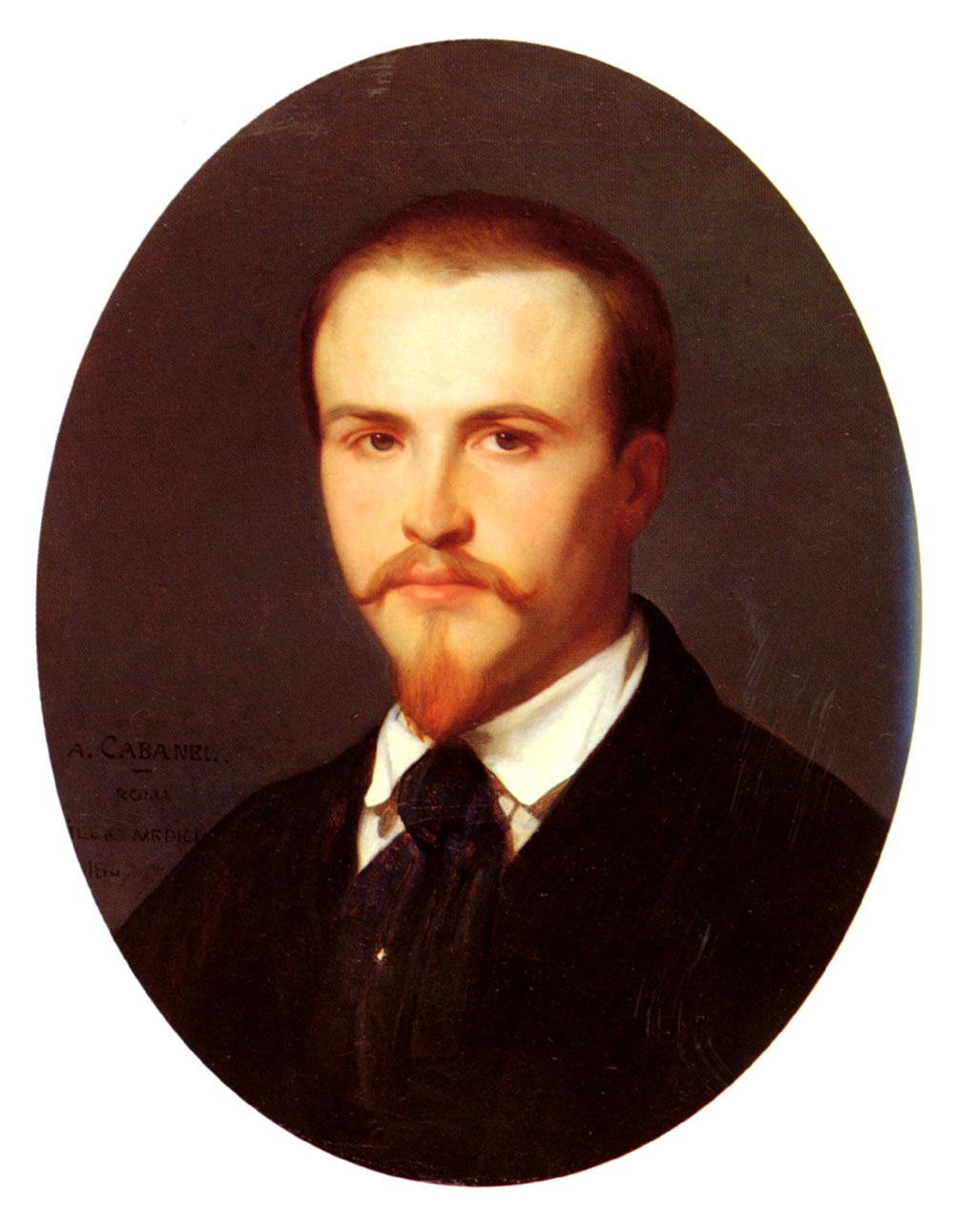
7 – 1847

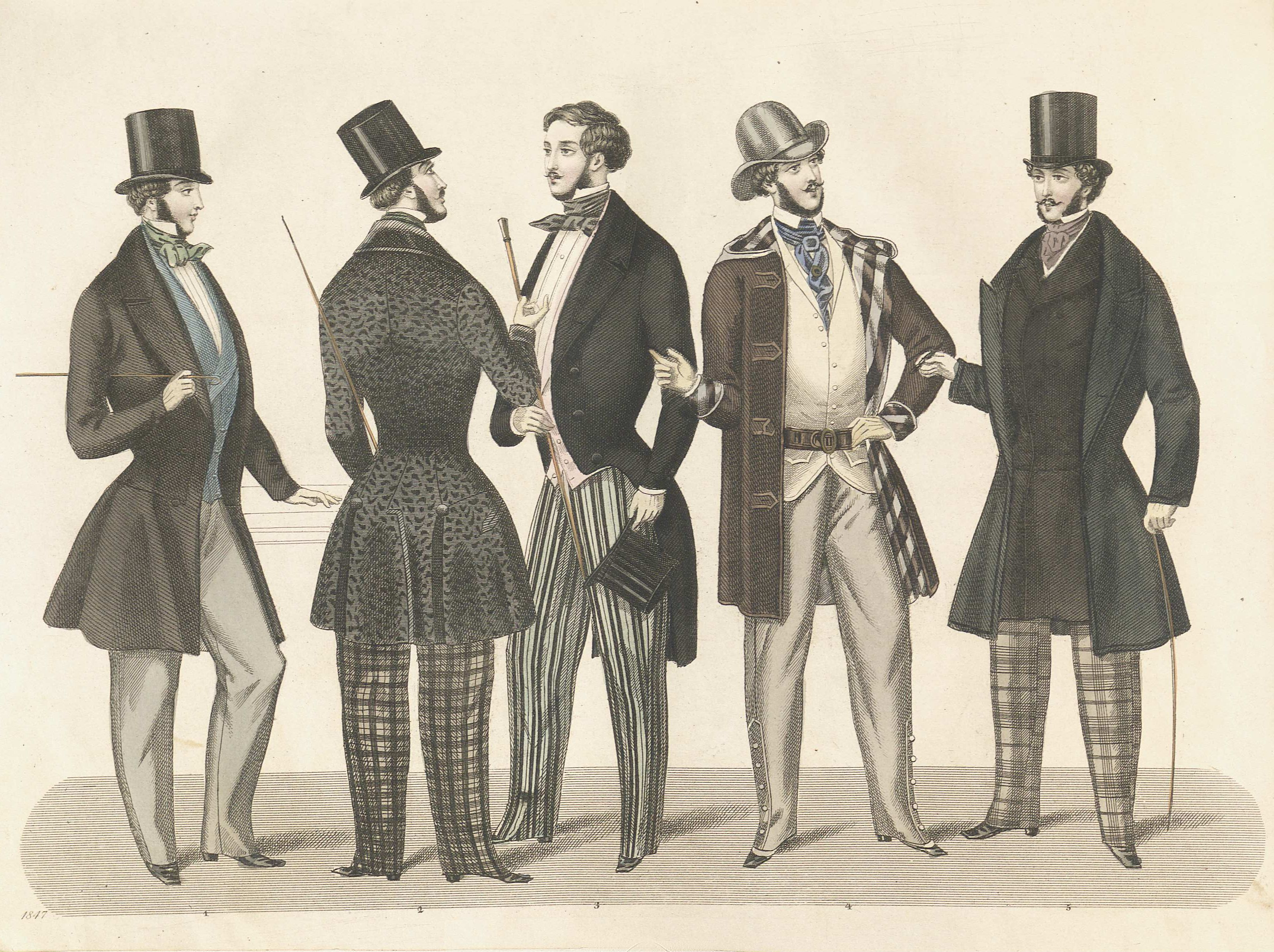
8 – 1847

9 – 1848

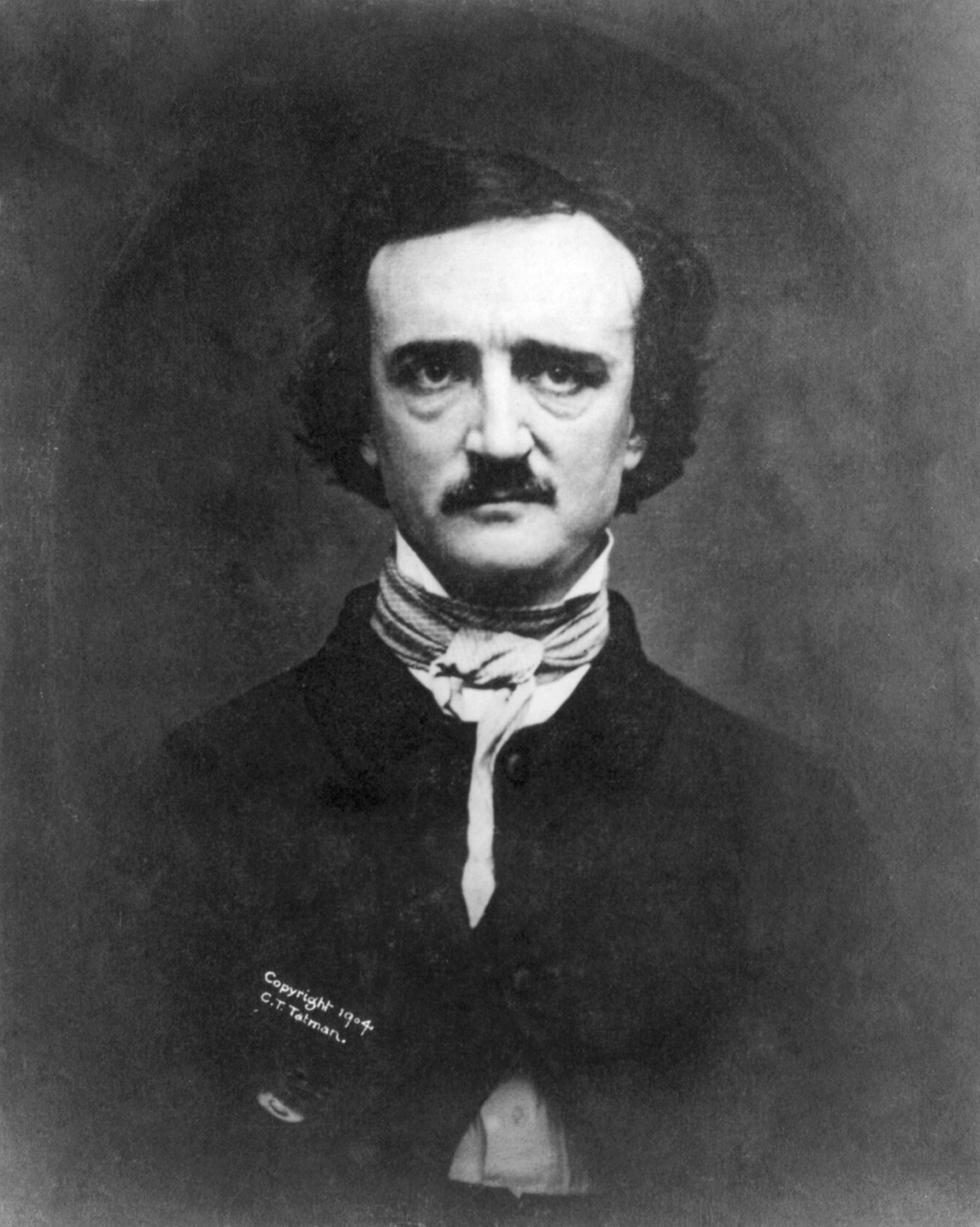
10 – 1849
1. Viennese fashion plate of 1841 shows at-home wear (a patterned dressing gown) and visiting wear. The top hat is becoming taller.
2. Alessandro Manzoni wears tan fly-front trousers with a dark coat and waistcoat. Italy, 1841.
3. British civil servant Charles Edward Trevelyan wears a boldly checked waistcoat and a patterned cravat with fly-front trousers and a dark frock coat, 1840s.
4. Travellers on a steamship, 1842.
5. Portrait shows Alexander von Humboldt in formal dress, 1843.
6. The Duke of Beaufort wears a dark coat and breeches with a deep red waistcoat. His black cravat is fastened with a stick pin, and he wears heeled boots in 1845.
7. Alexandre Cabanel wears his cravat loosely tied and secured with a stickpin, 1847.
8. 1847 fashion plate
9. 1848 fashion plate shows the lowered waistline and full, rounded chest popular in the latter 1840s (compare to the waistline of the 1841 styles).
10. Daguerreotype of poet Edgar Allan Poe, C.1849

== Fashion plates ==
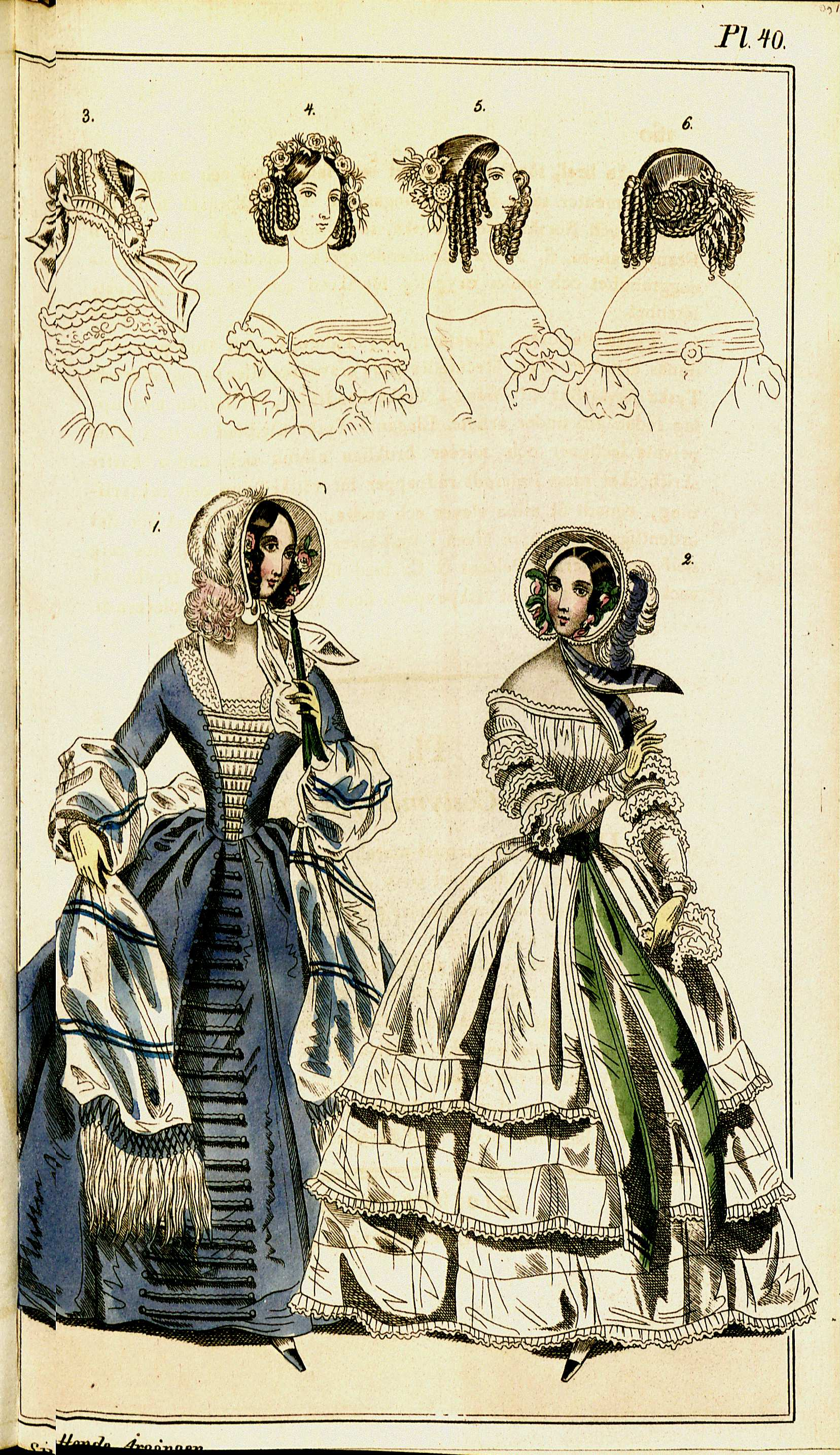
1840

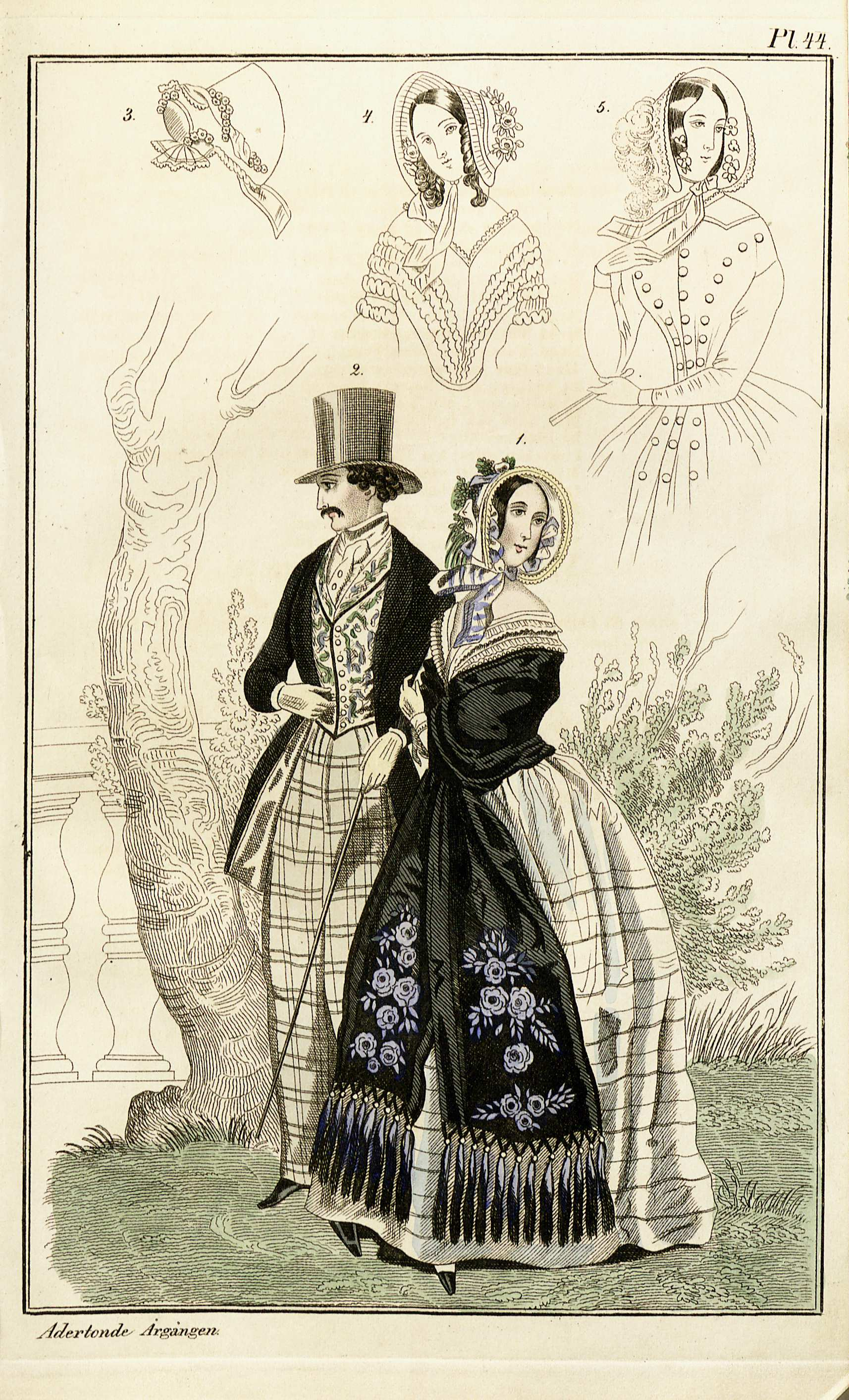
1841

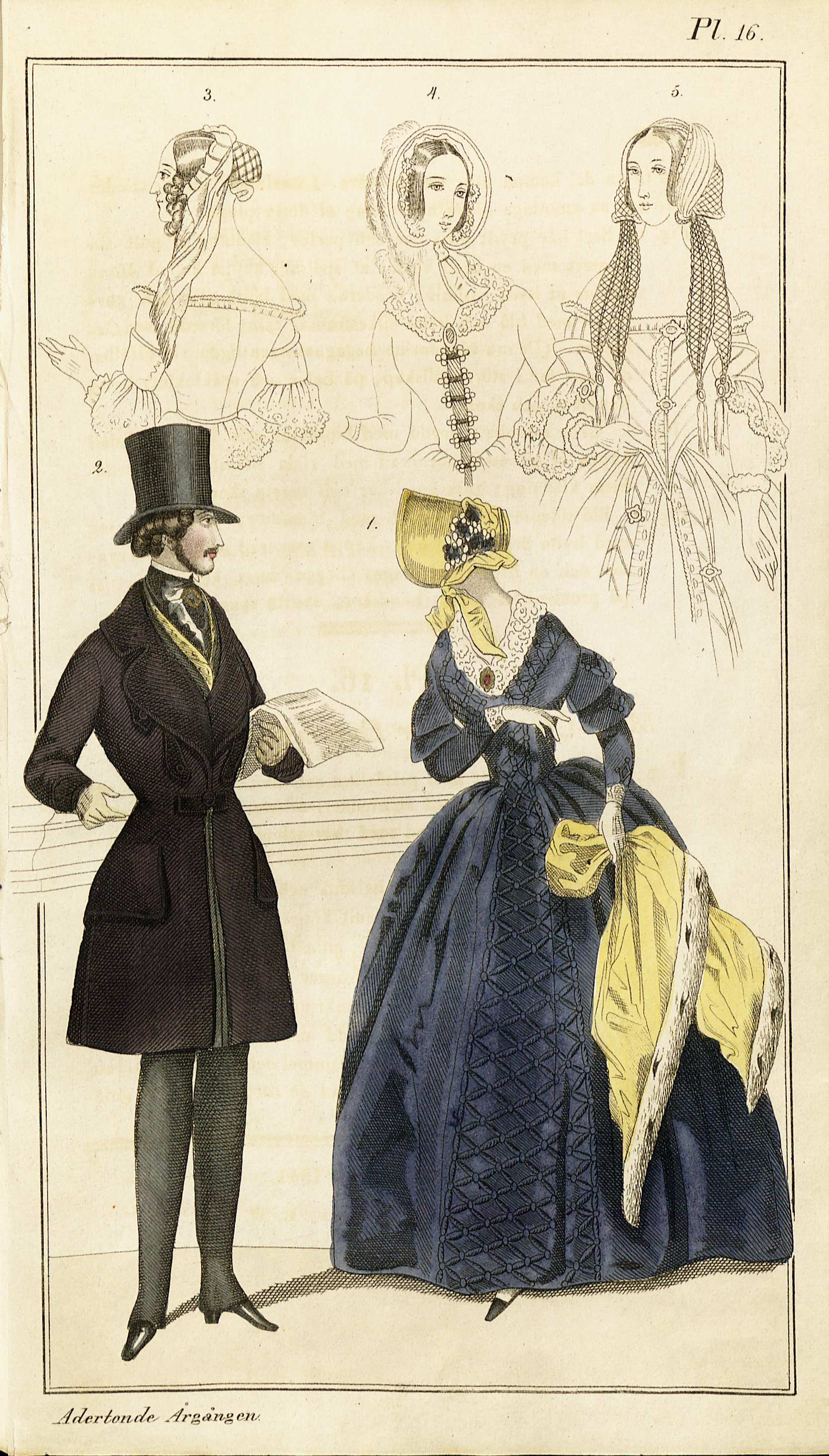
1841

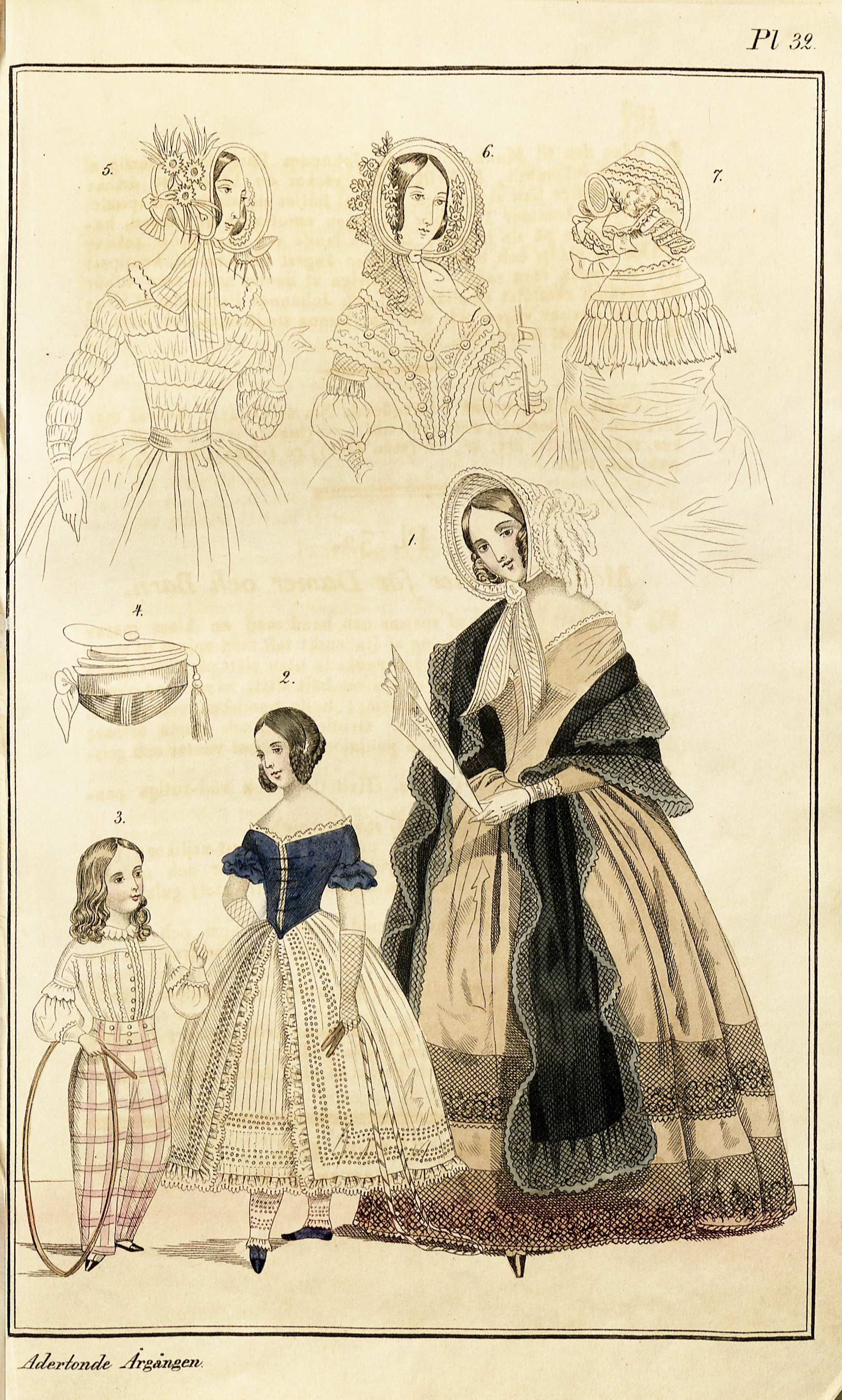
1841

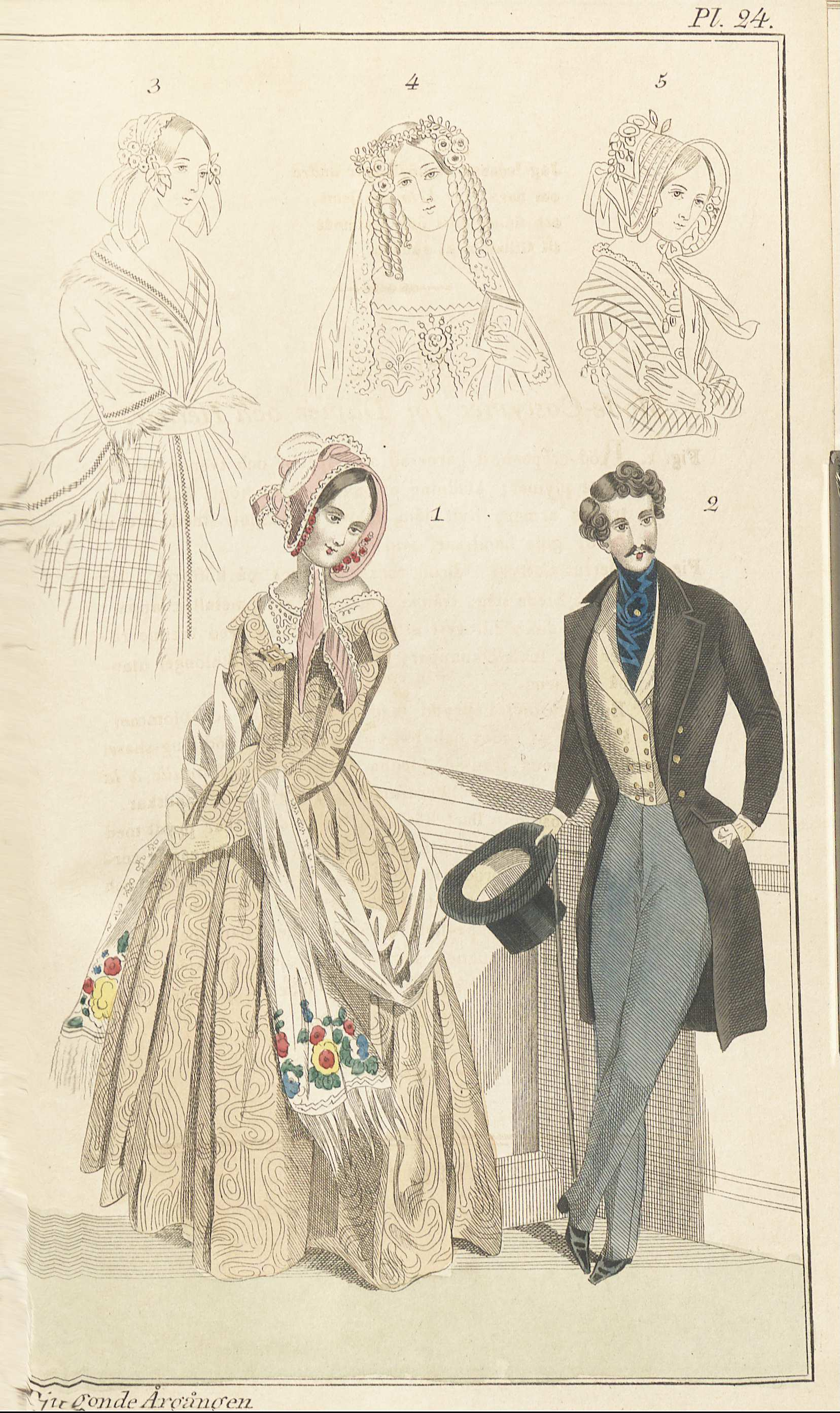
1843

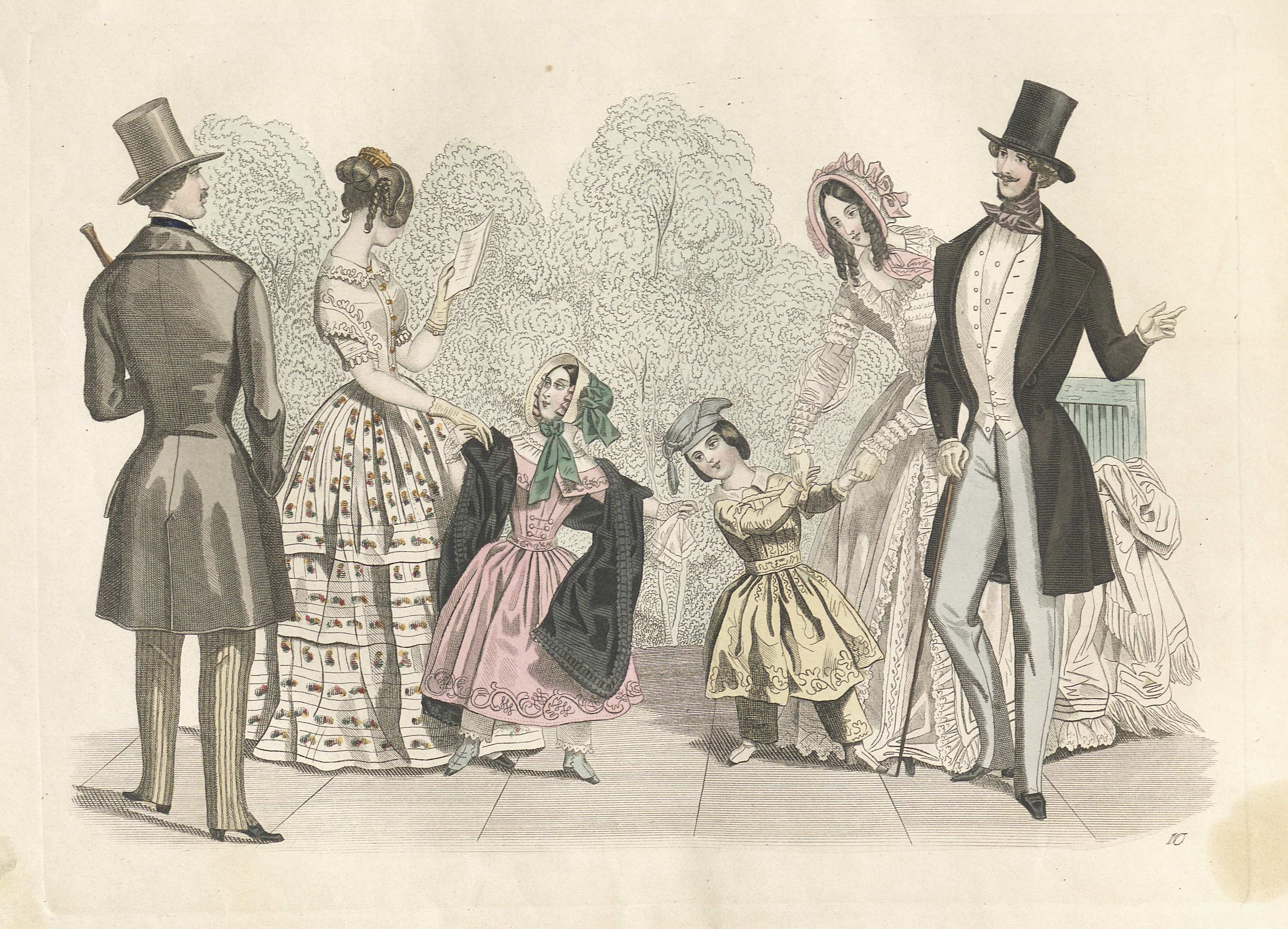
1843

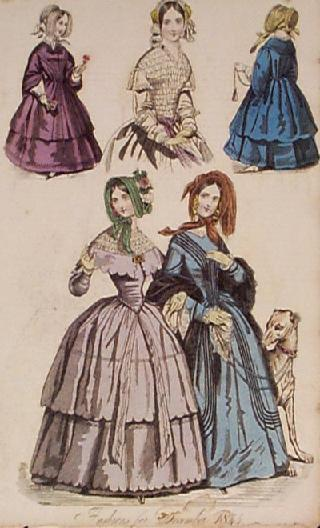
1844

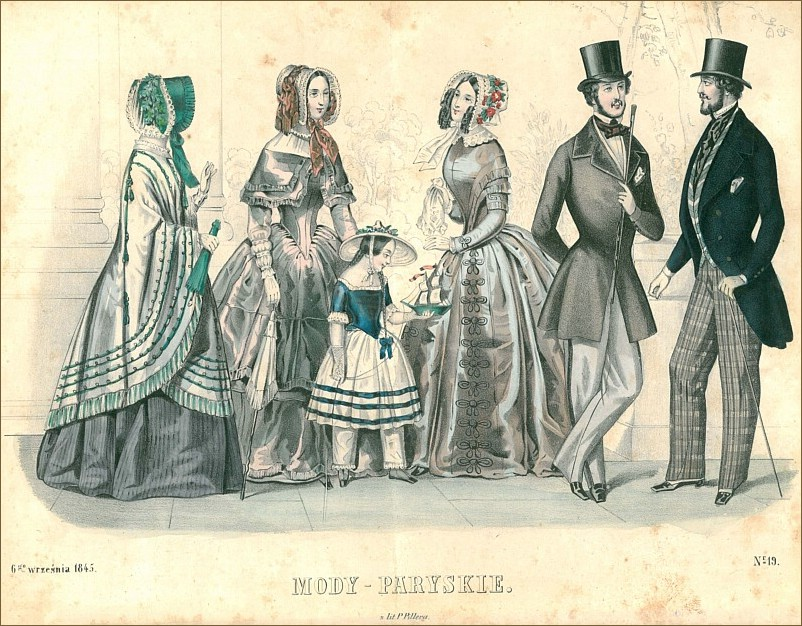
1845

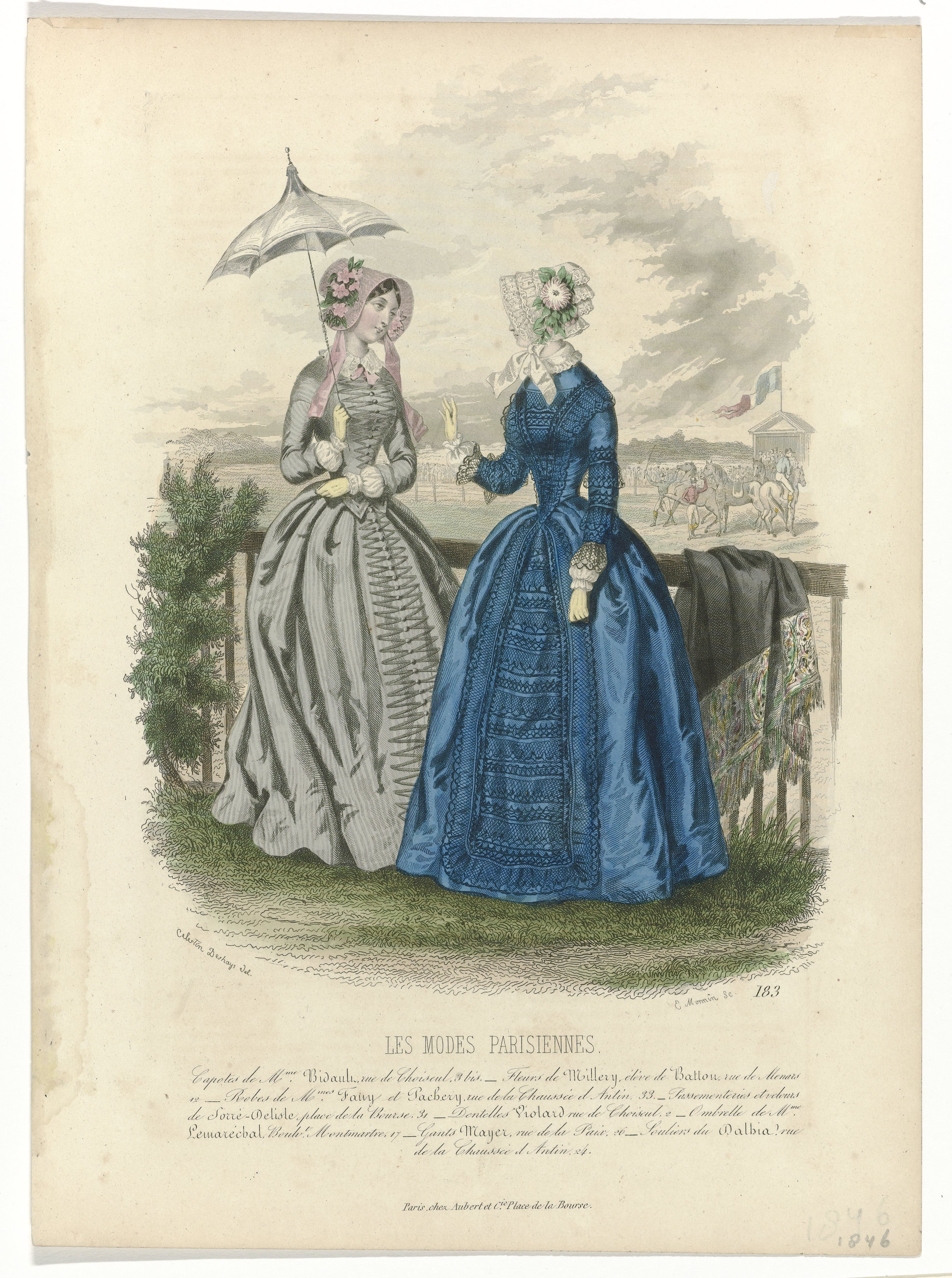
1846

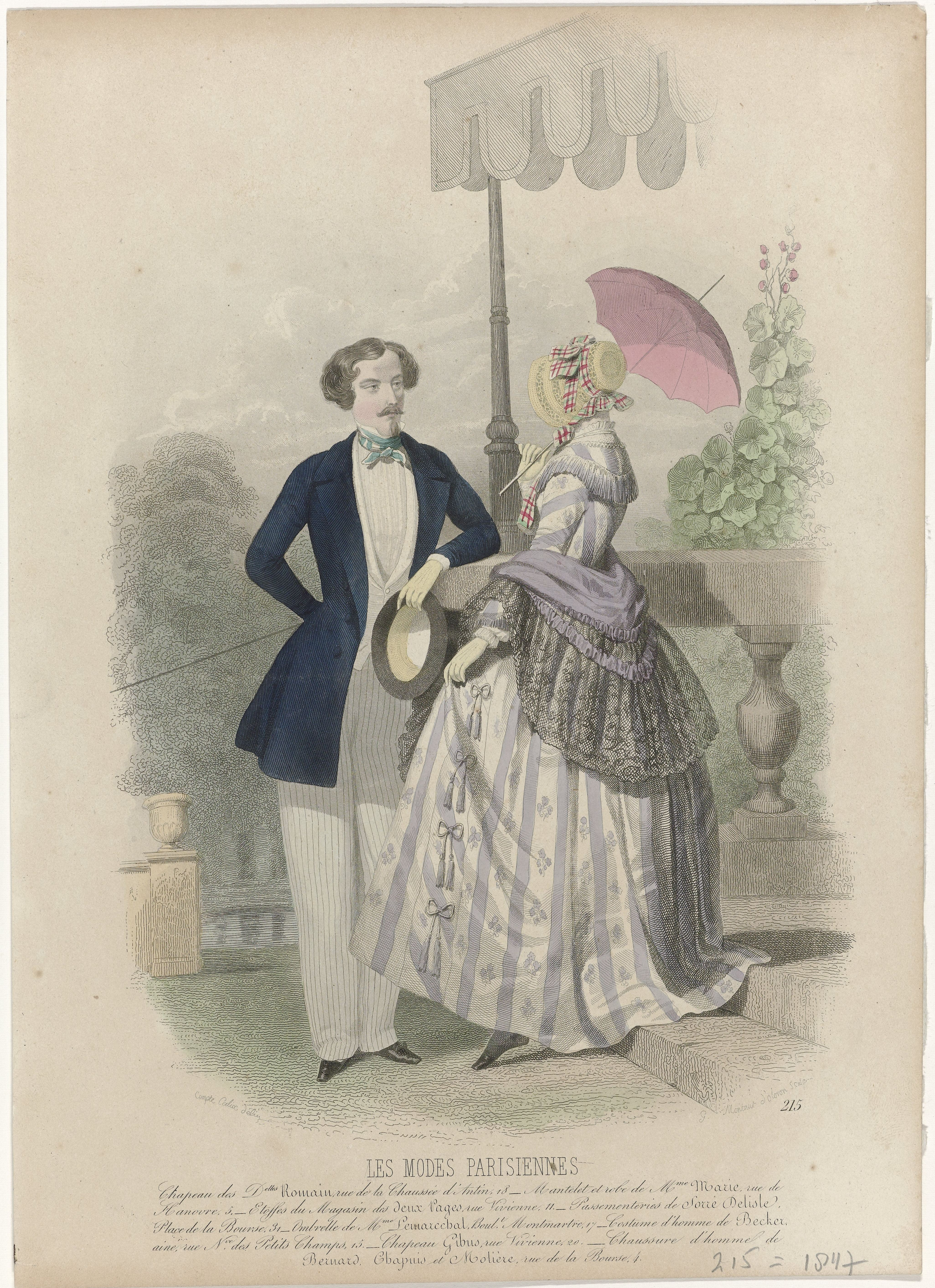
1847

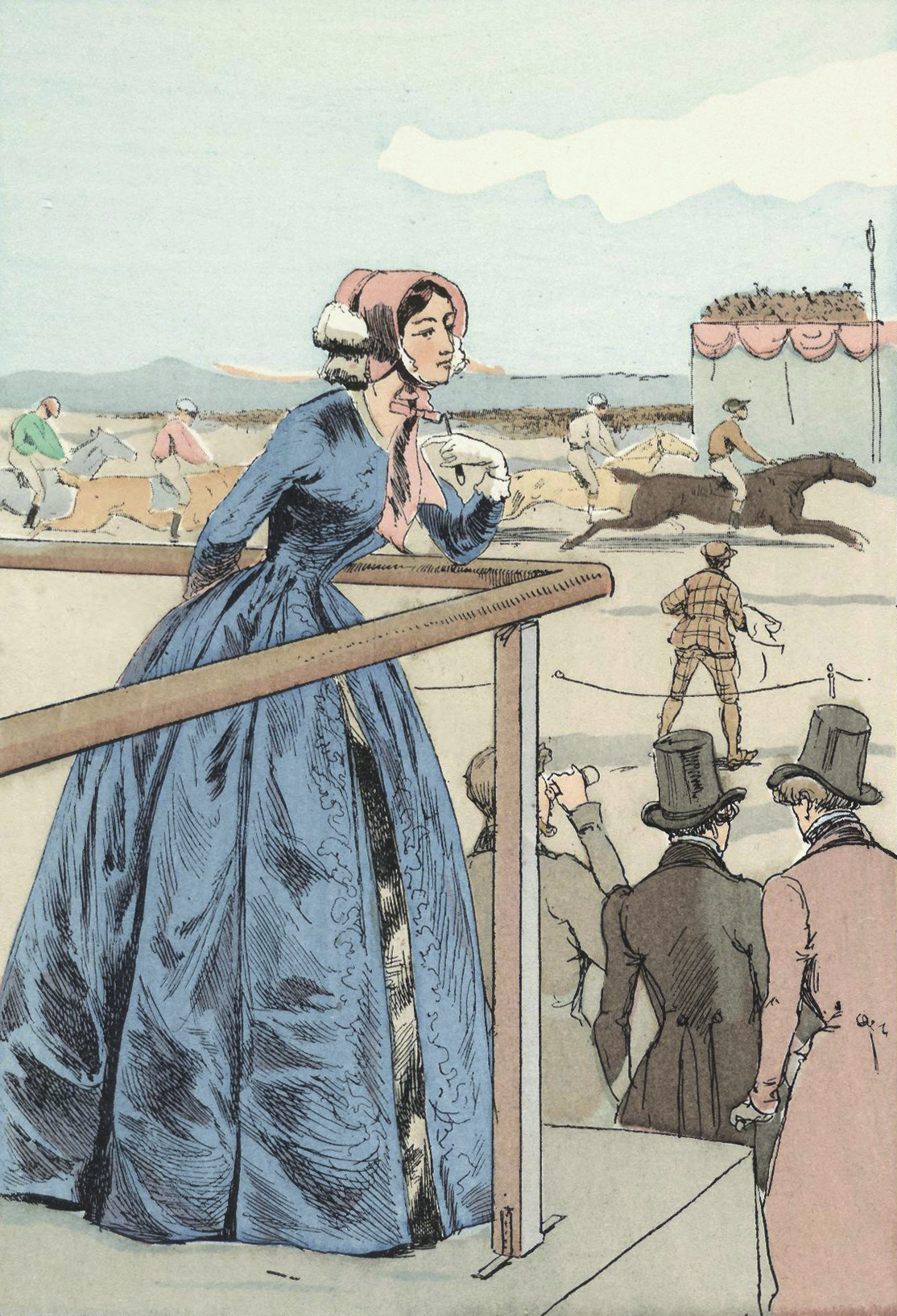
1848

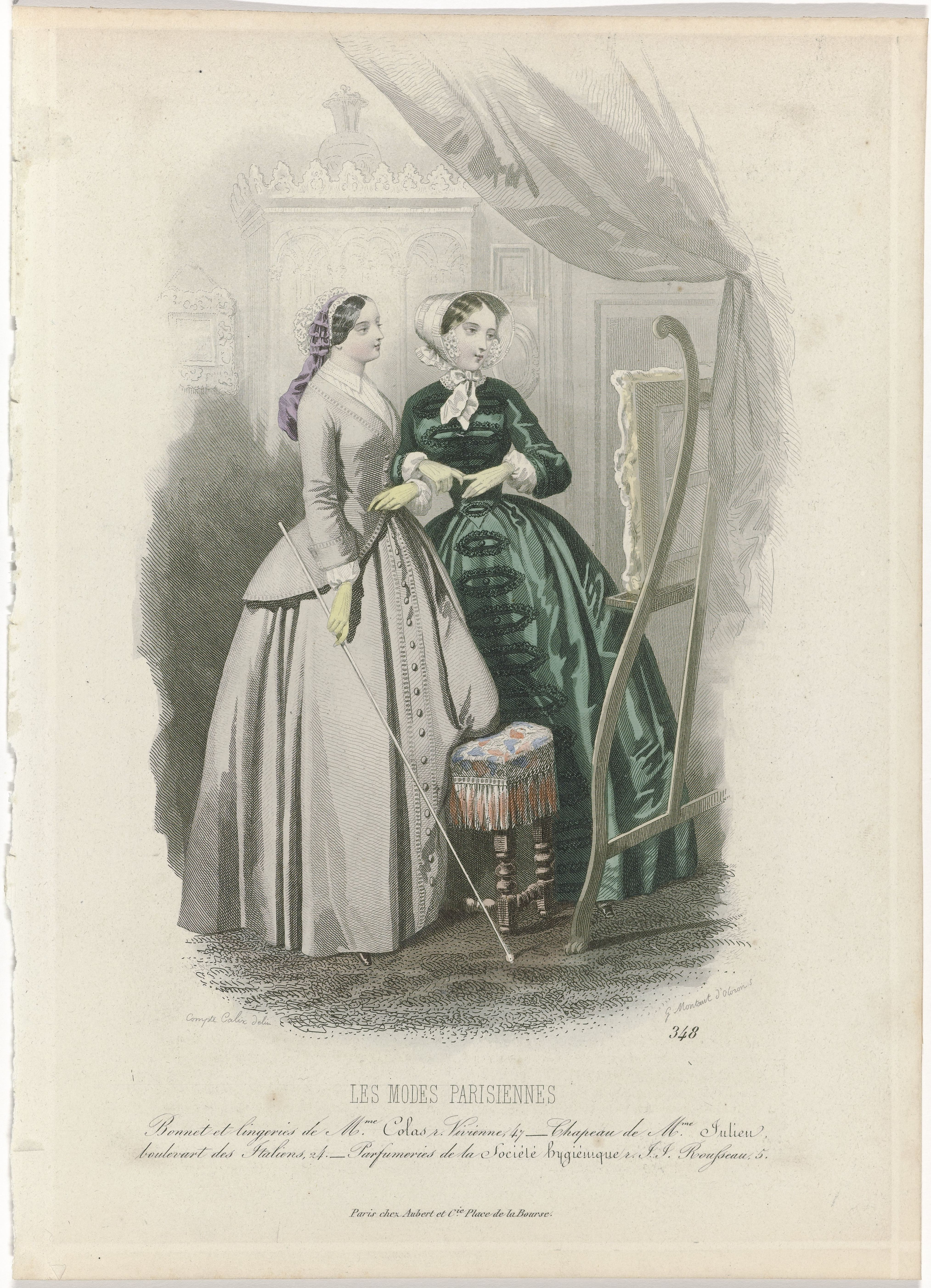
1849

== Children's fashion ==
In this period, children's wear followed trends found in adult fashion. Wool and cashmere were popular textiles for baby cloaks while cotton was still widely accepted for toddler dresses, drawers and play wear. A popular silhouette for toddlers was a cotton bodice, pleated skirt and long sleeves. Small boys (ages 3 through 6) commonly wore a tunic suit. The jackets were fitted to the waist and then flared out to a full skirt ending at knee length. This was worn over trousers, or for very small boys with drawers. A round-collared shirt was usually worn underneath the jacket. Elementary to older age boys wore an Eton suit, which was a short, waist-level jacket, trousers, round-collared shirts, vest and sometimes neckties. In 1840 flat caps were popularly worn for boys. Small girls wore cotton drawers, cotton chemise, petticoats and stockings. As girls got older in age they followed the trend of their mothers and began to wear stays or tight corsets. "Barley" or "sugar" curls became a popular hairstyle for both girls and boys: they were long, droopy curls that framed the face.

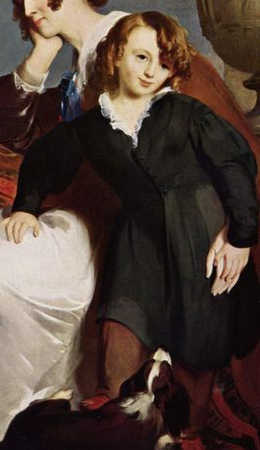
Young boy in tunic, shirt, and trousers, 1840

The Farwell children, 1841

French boy, 1843–44

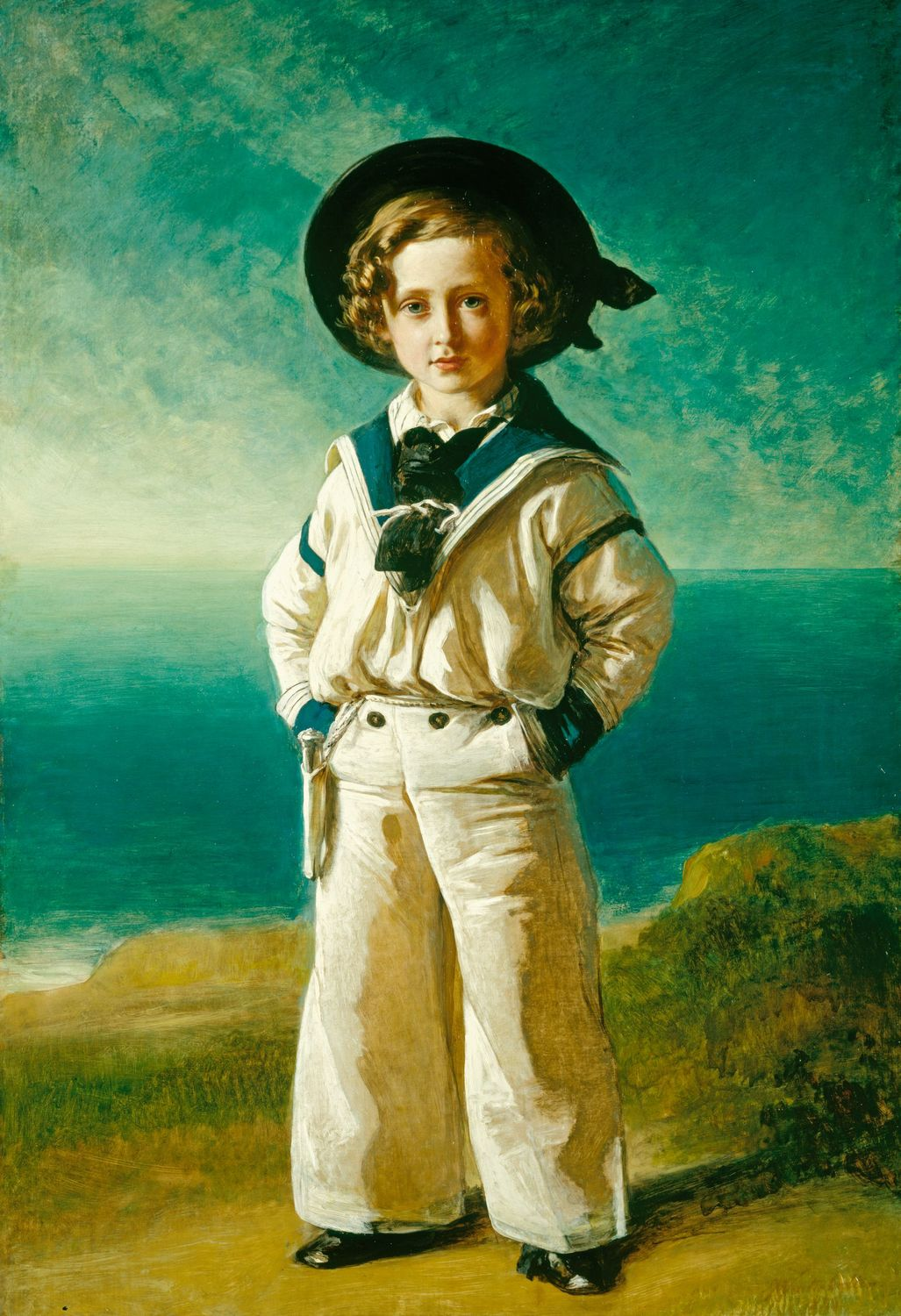
Portrait of Edward, Prince of Wales, The future King Edward VII in a sailor suit, 1846

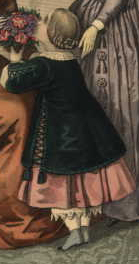
Fashion plate of young girl's costume, 1849

== Photographs ==
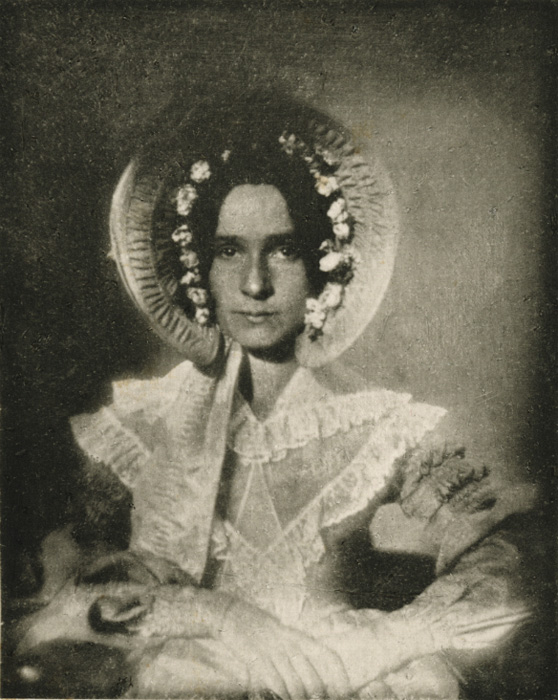
Dorothy Draper ca 1840

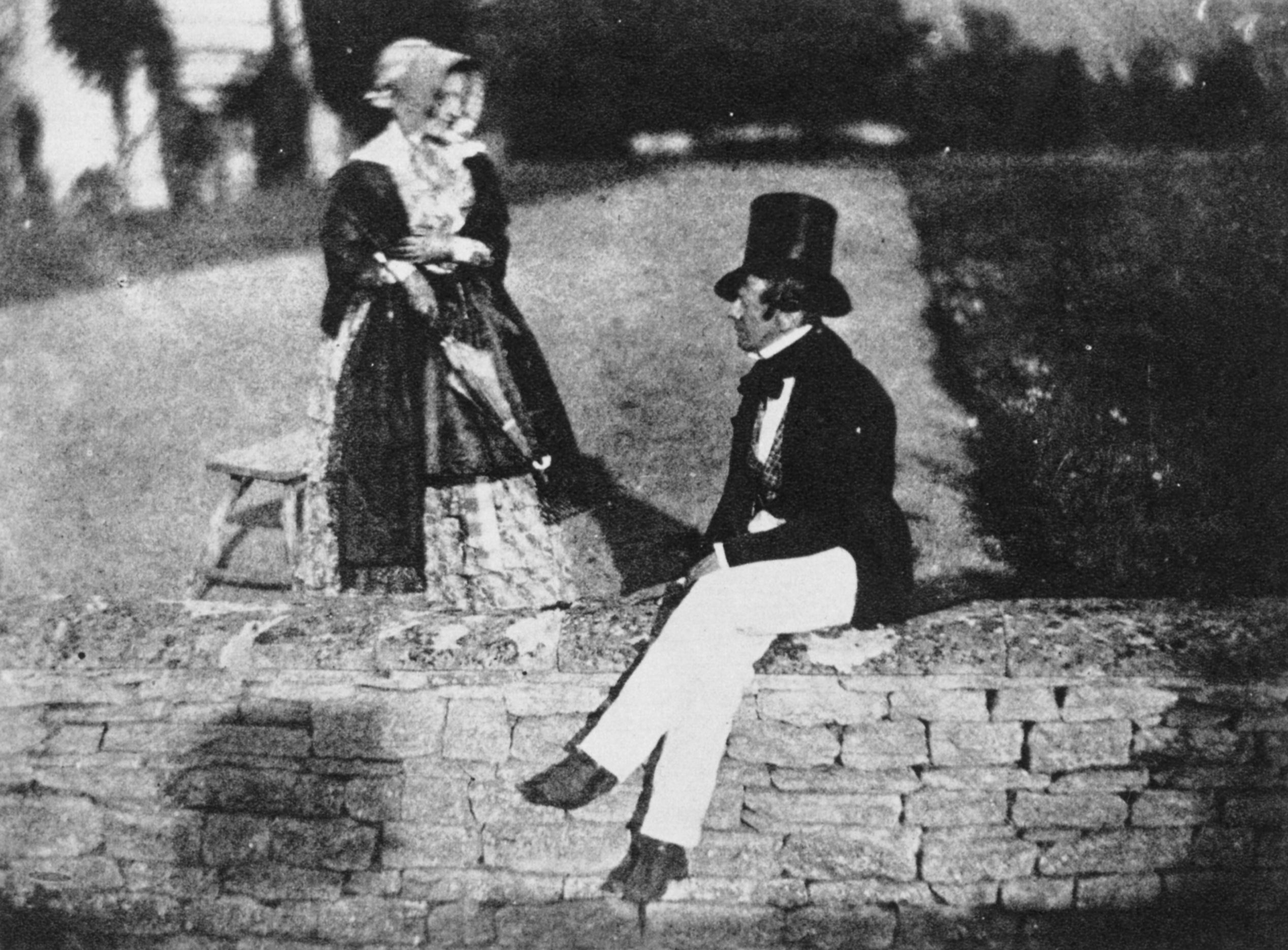
between 1842 and 1844

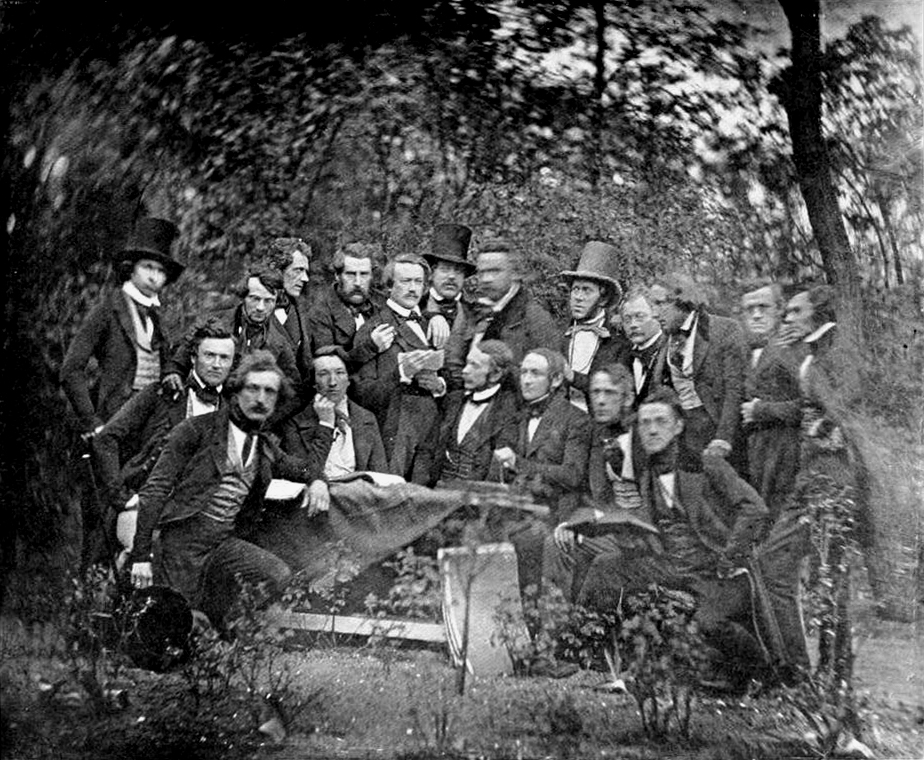
1843

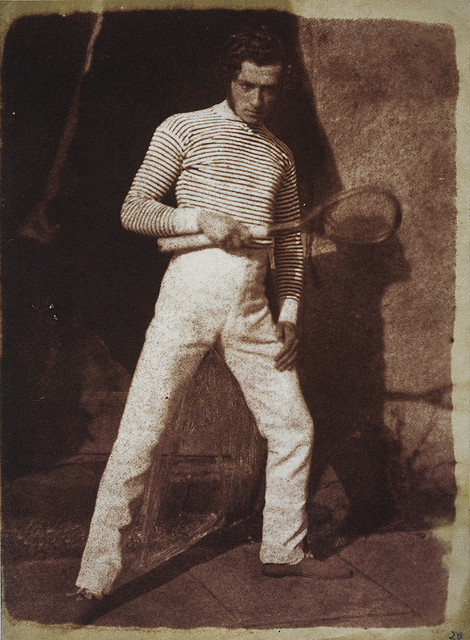
1843

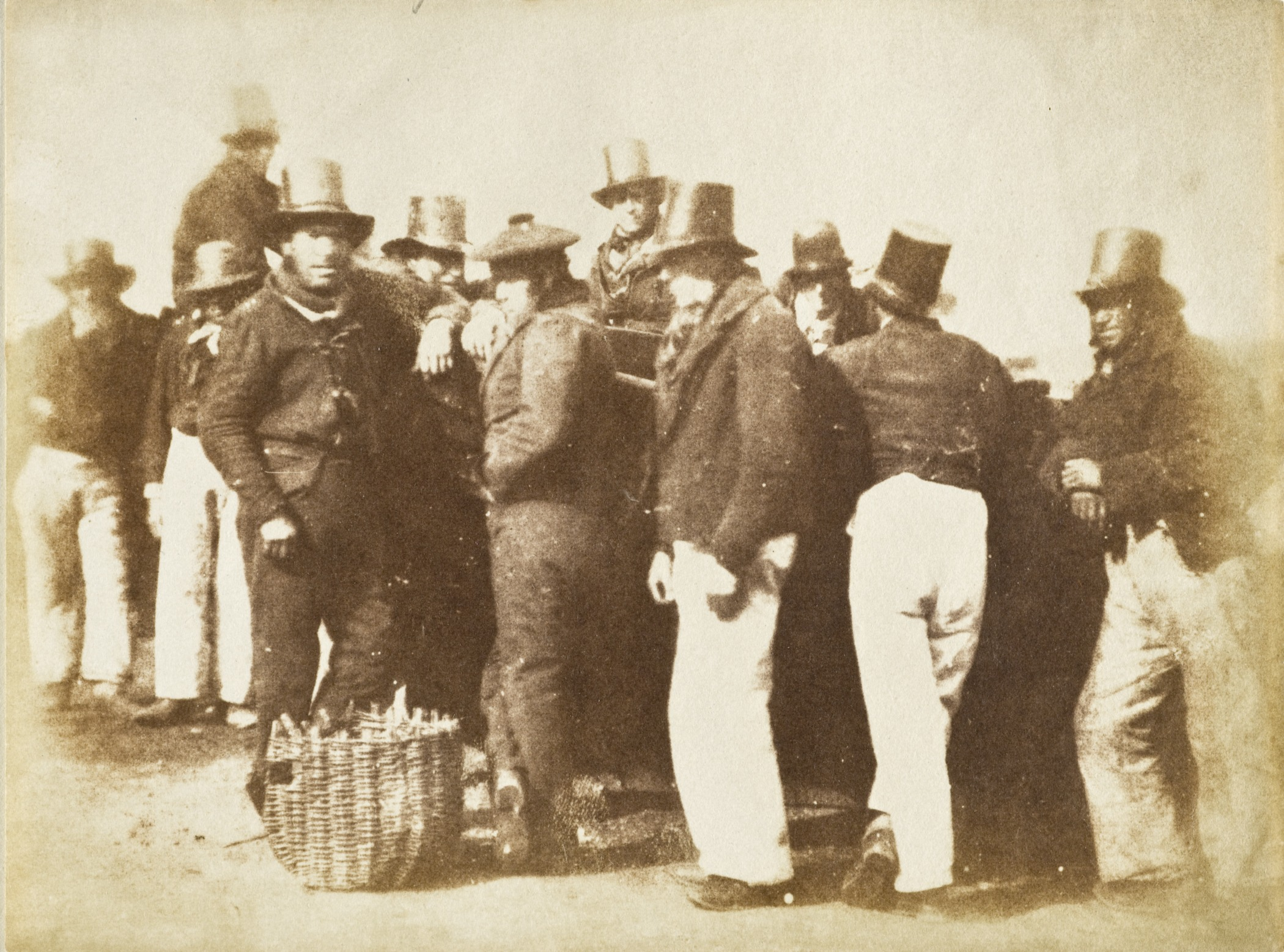
1844

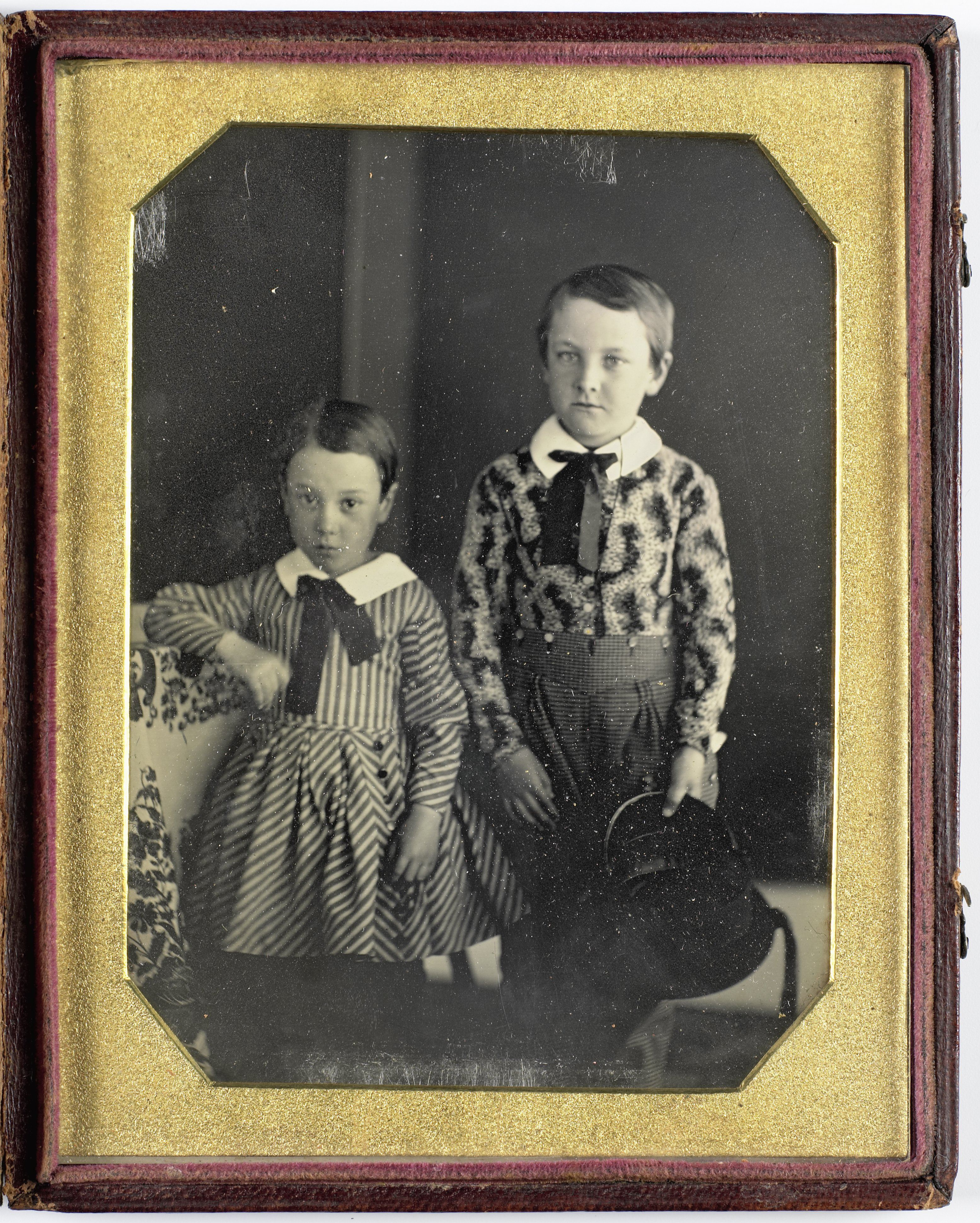
1845

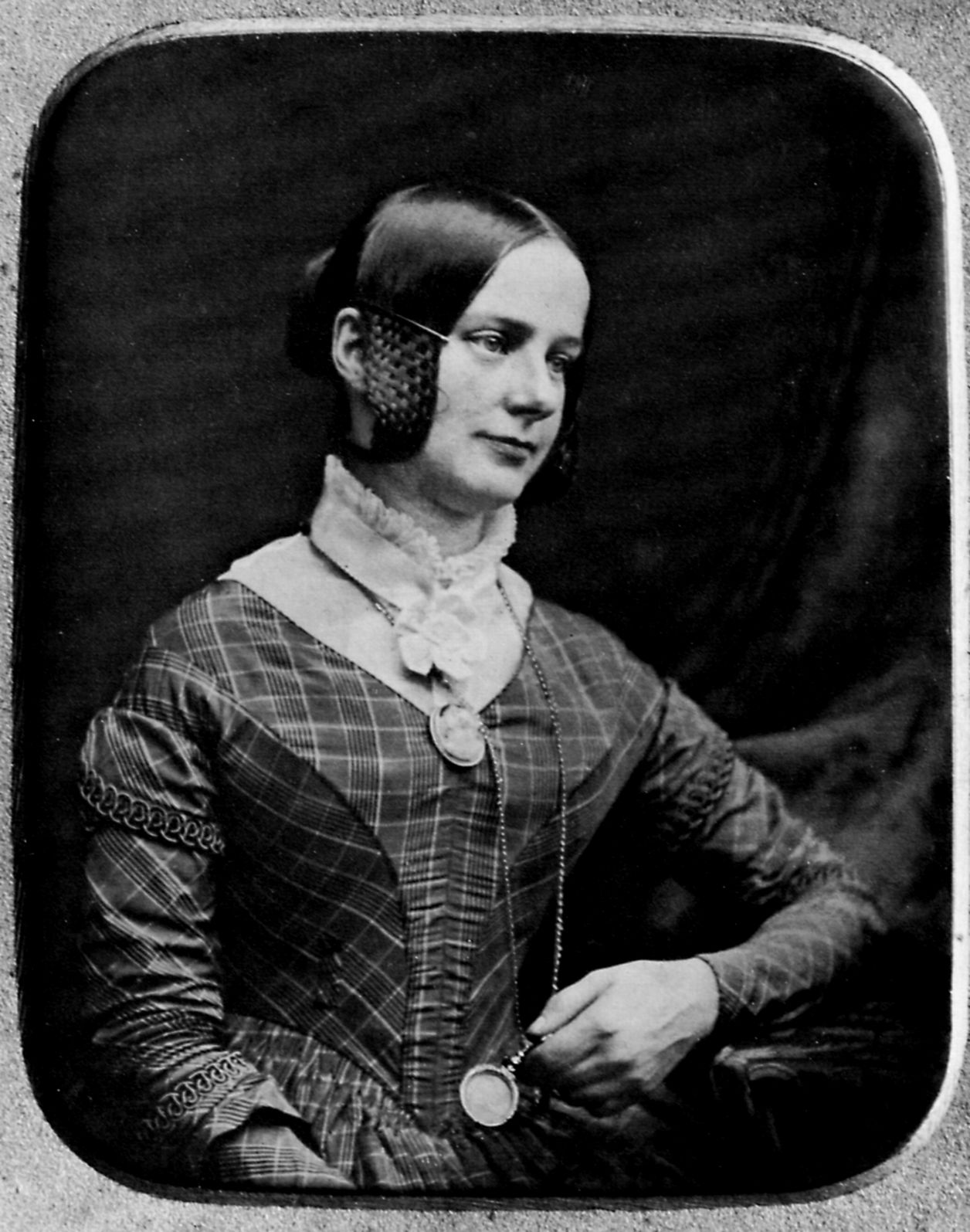
1845

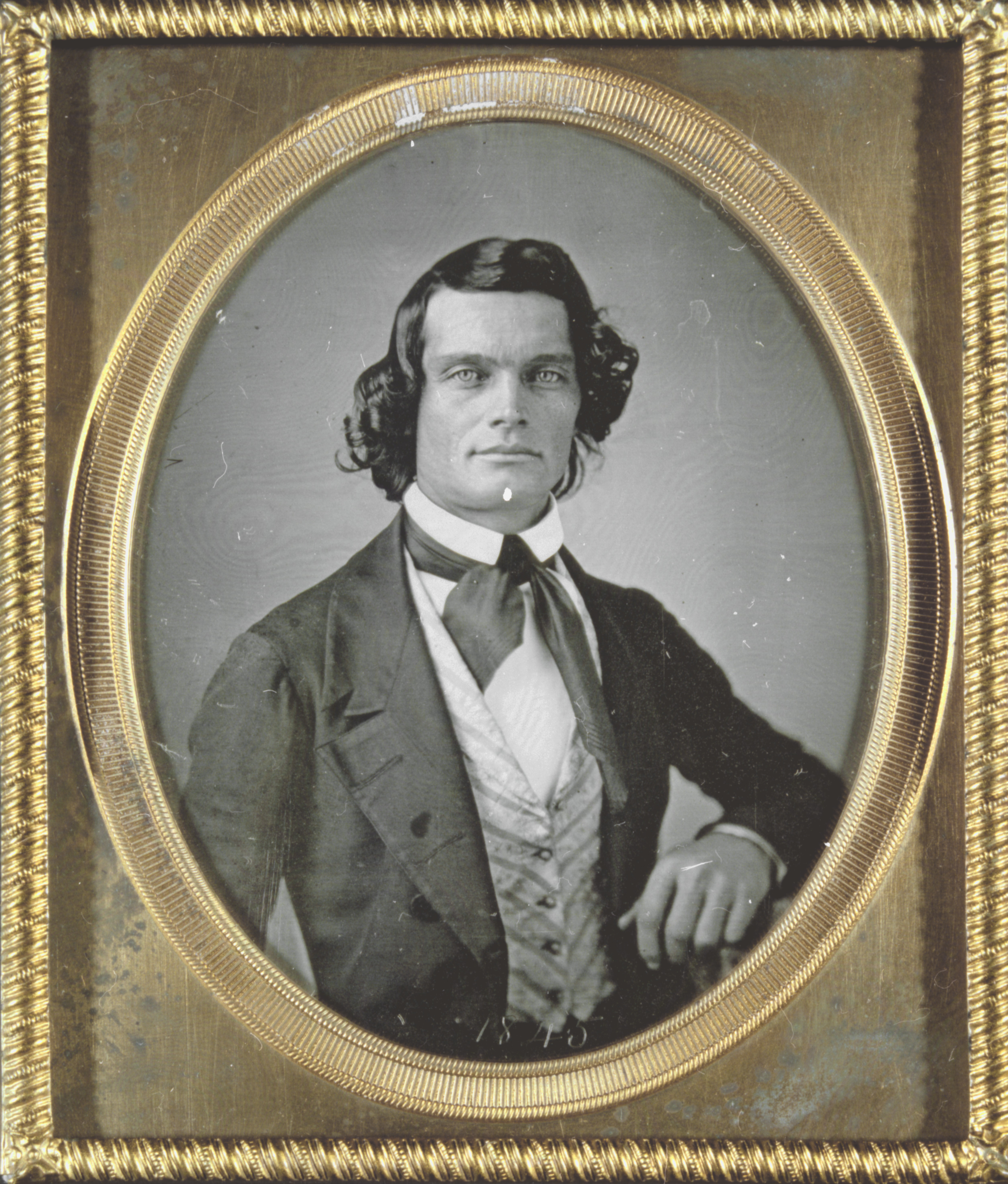
1845

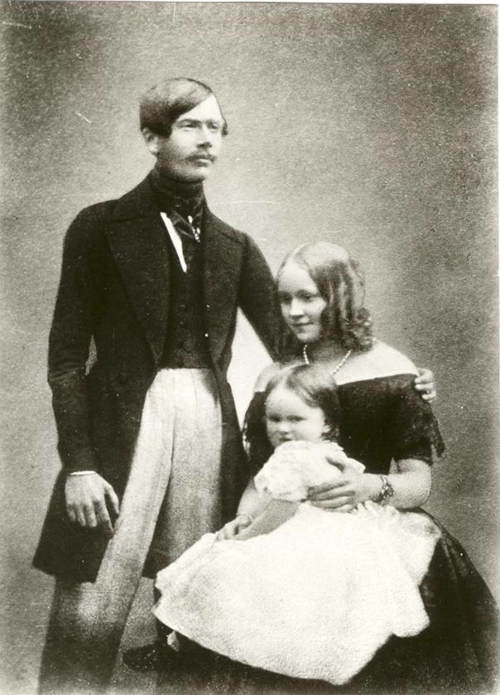
1845

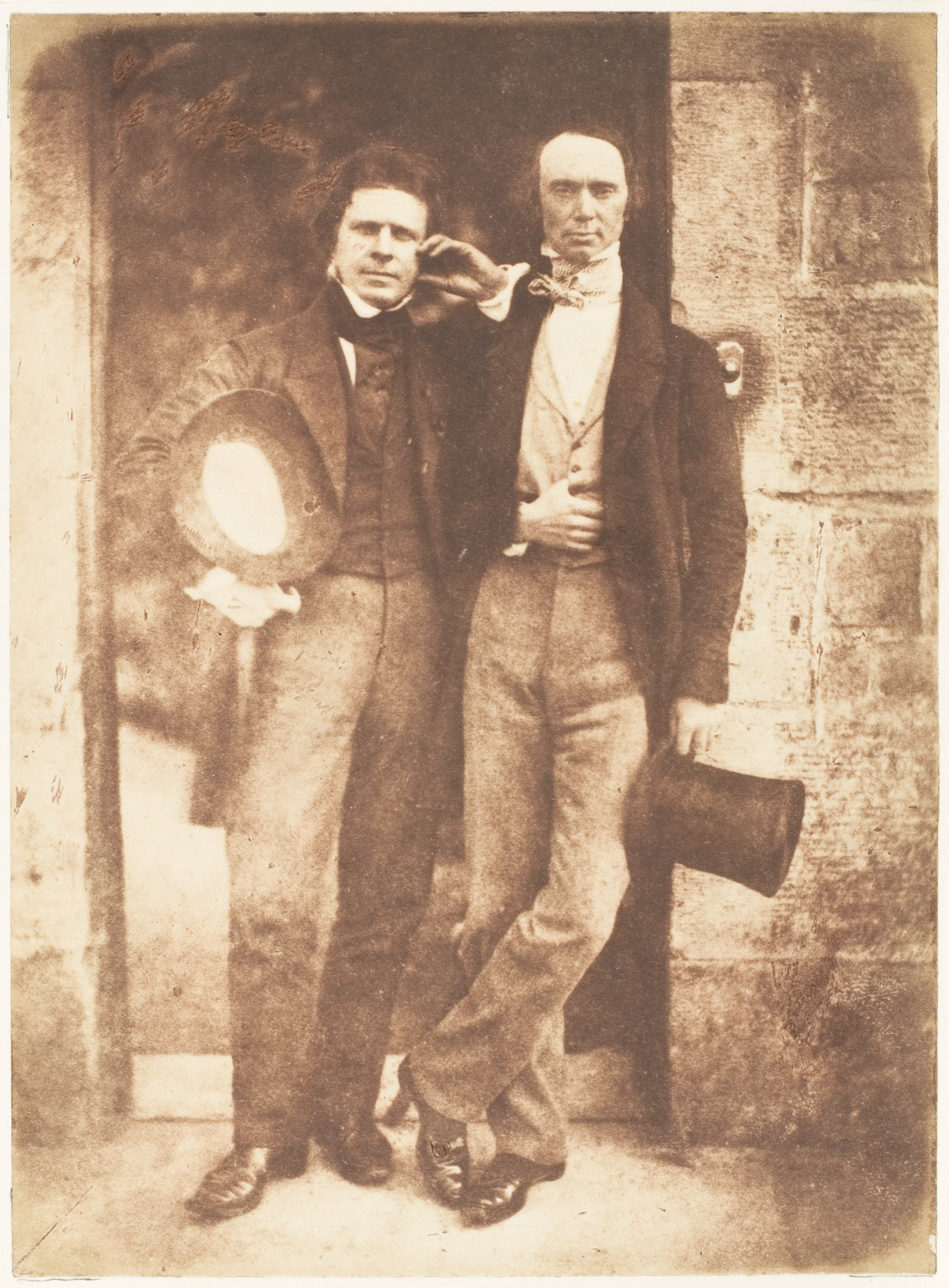
1843–47

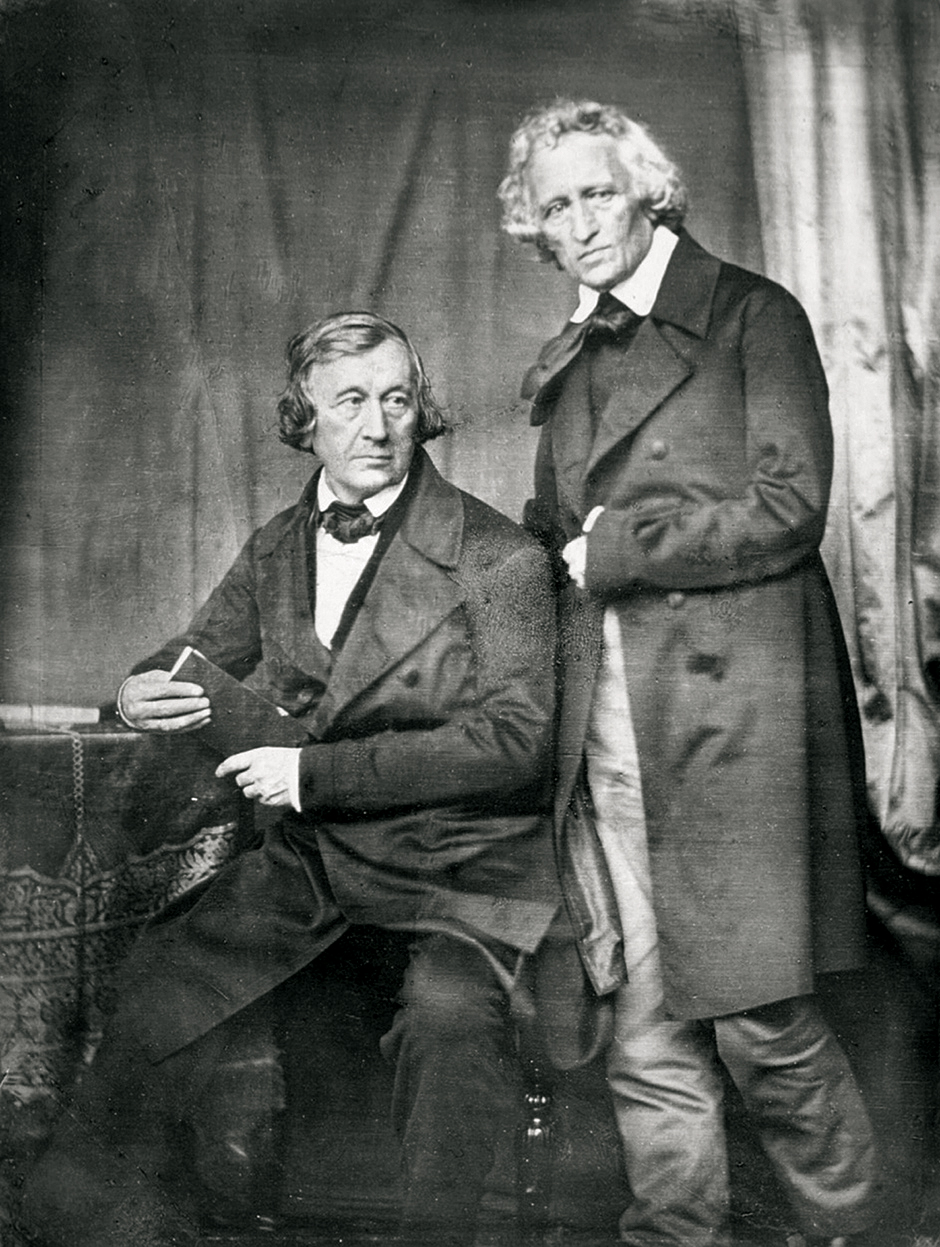
The Brothers Grimm 1847

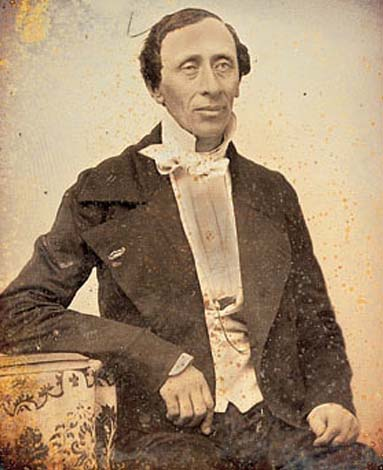
H C Andersen 1847

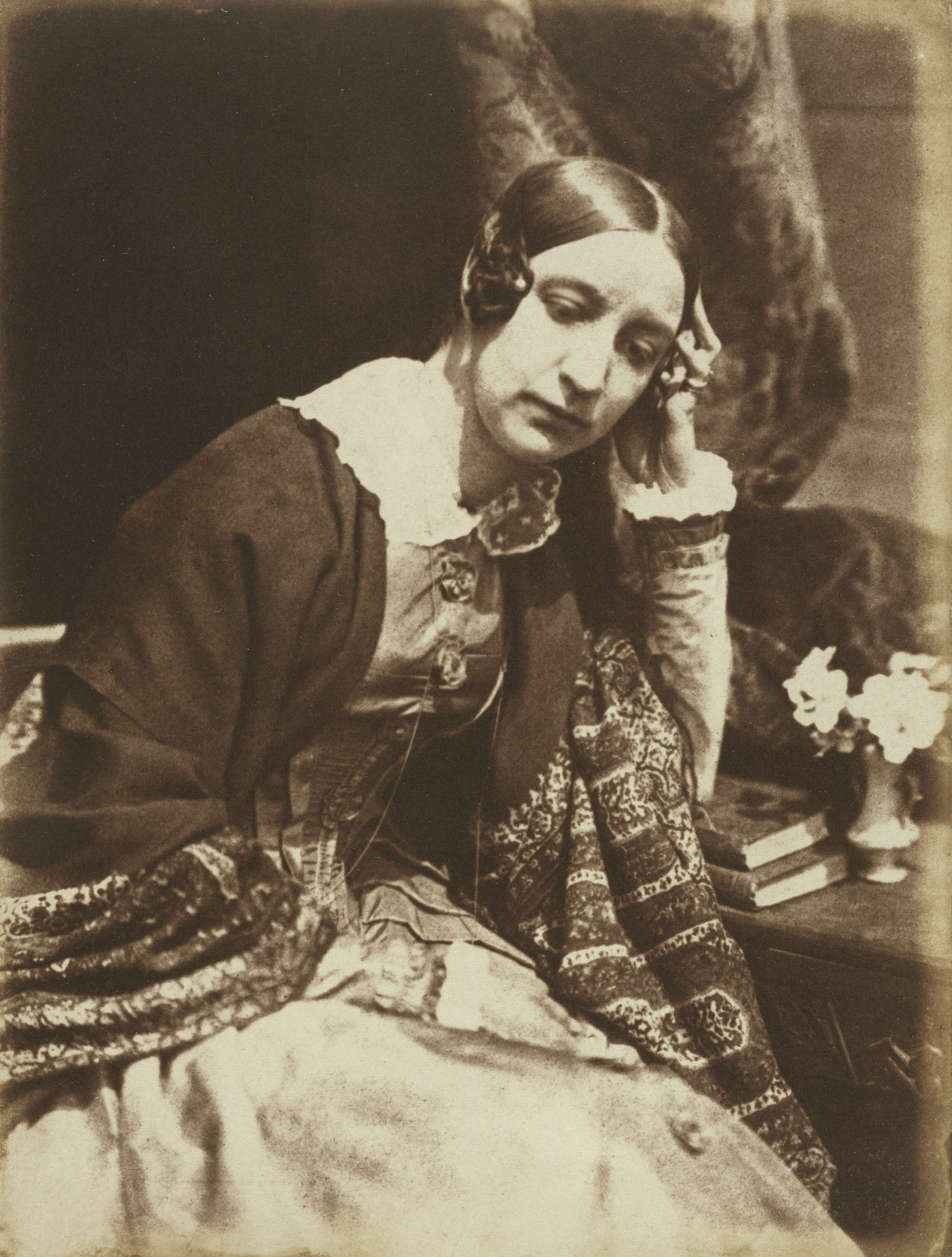
Elizabeth Eastlake ca 1847

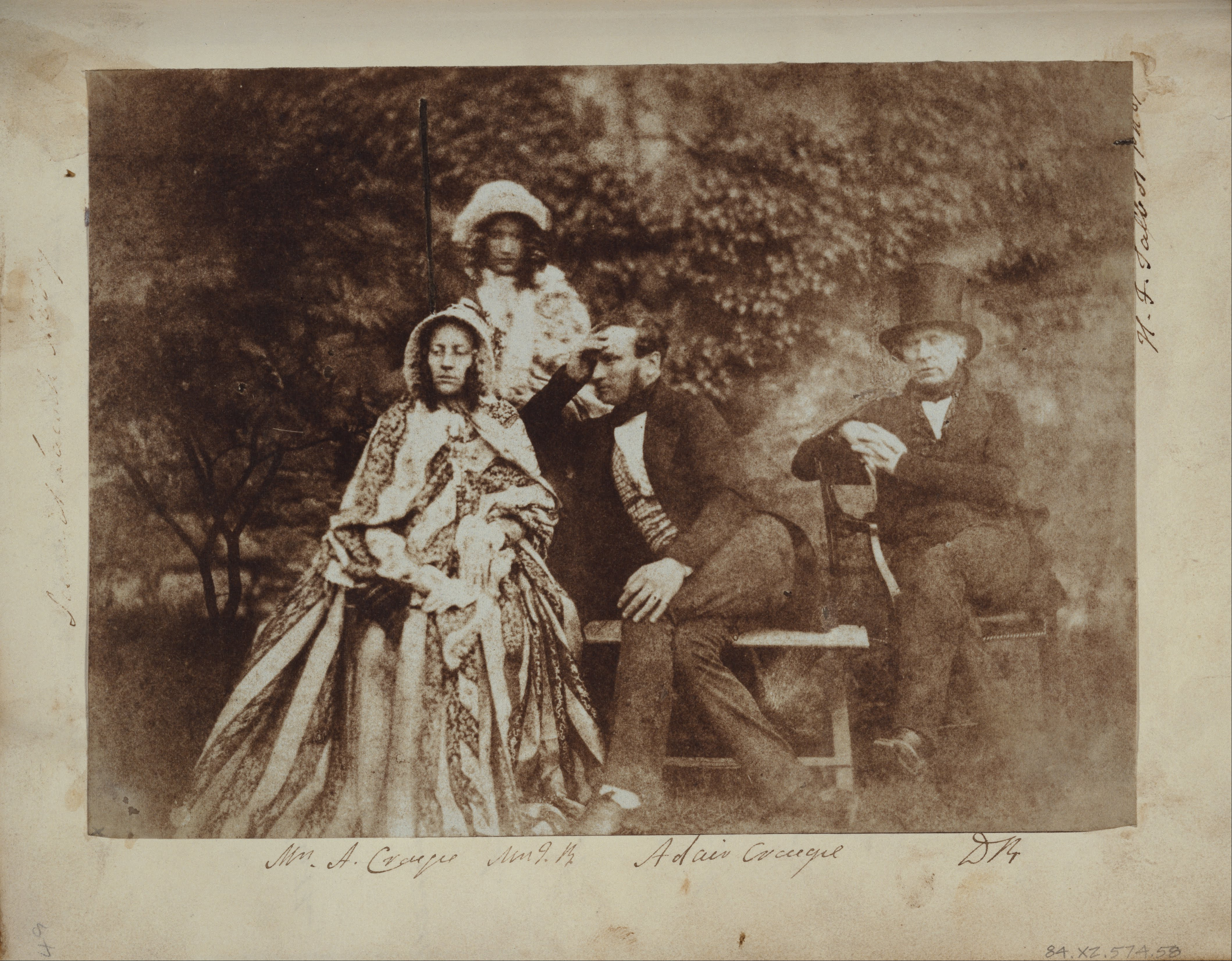
ca 1847

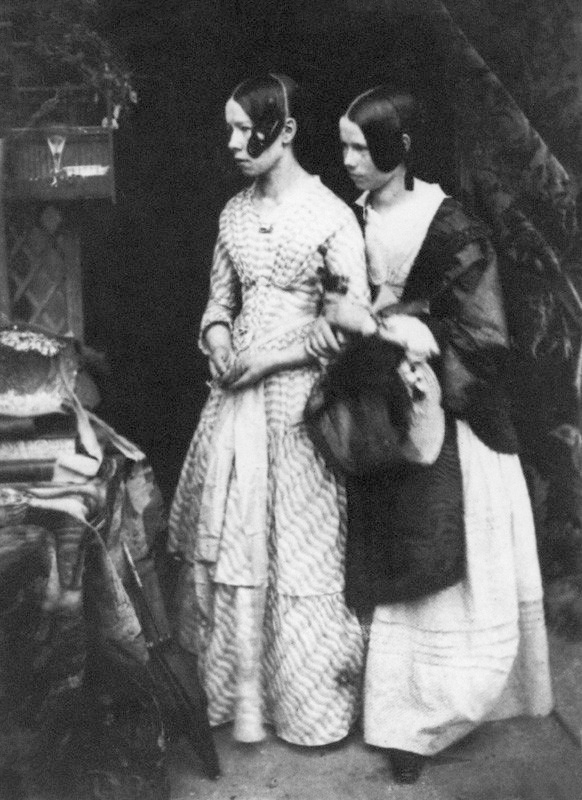
Calotype of Ellen Milne & Agnes Milne between 1843 and 1848

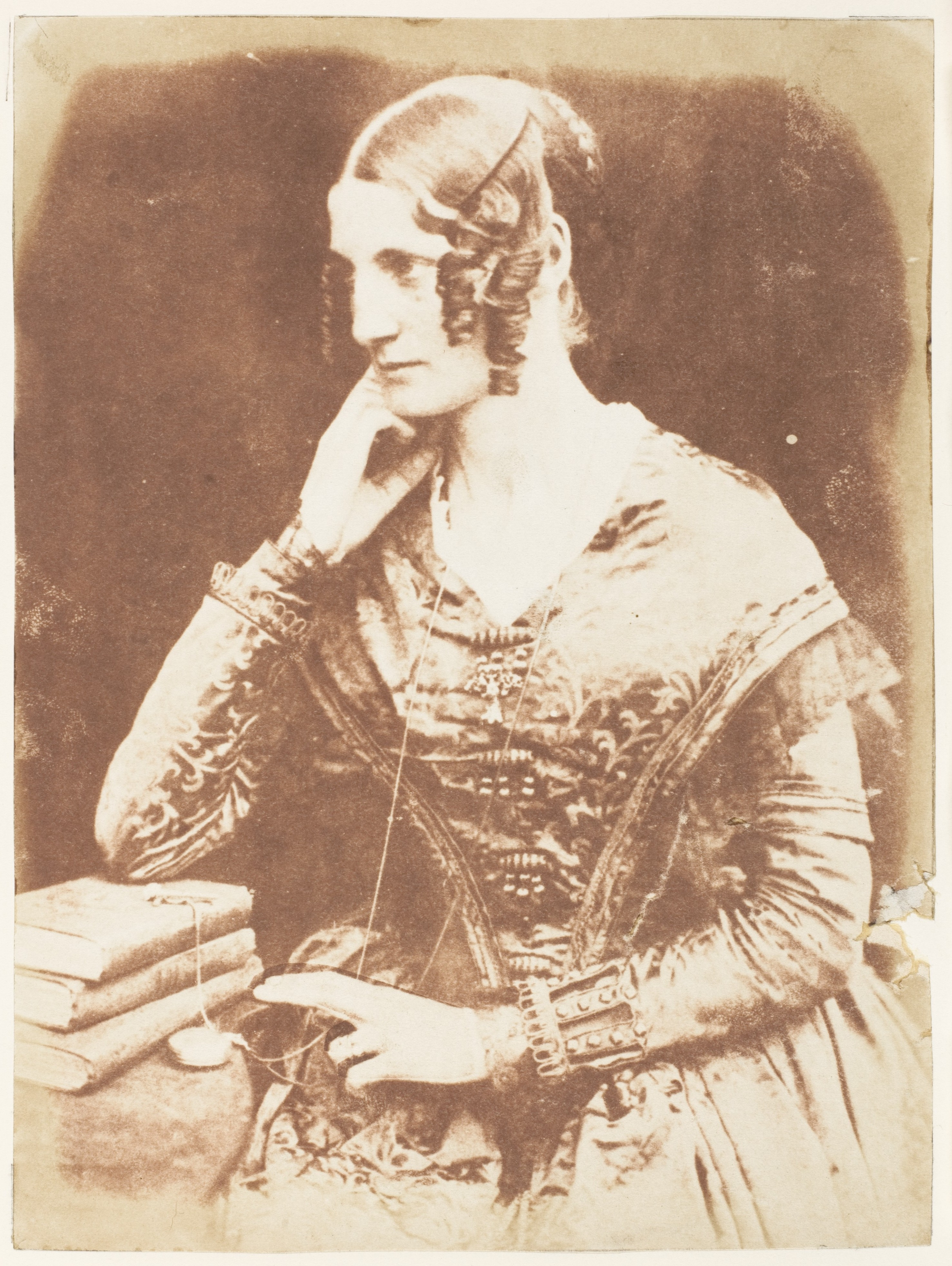
Between 1843 and 1848

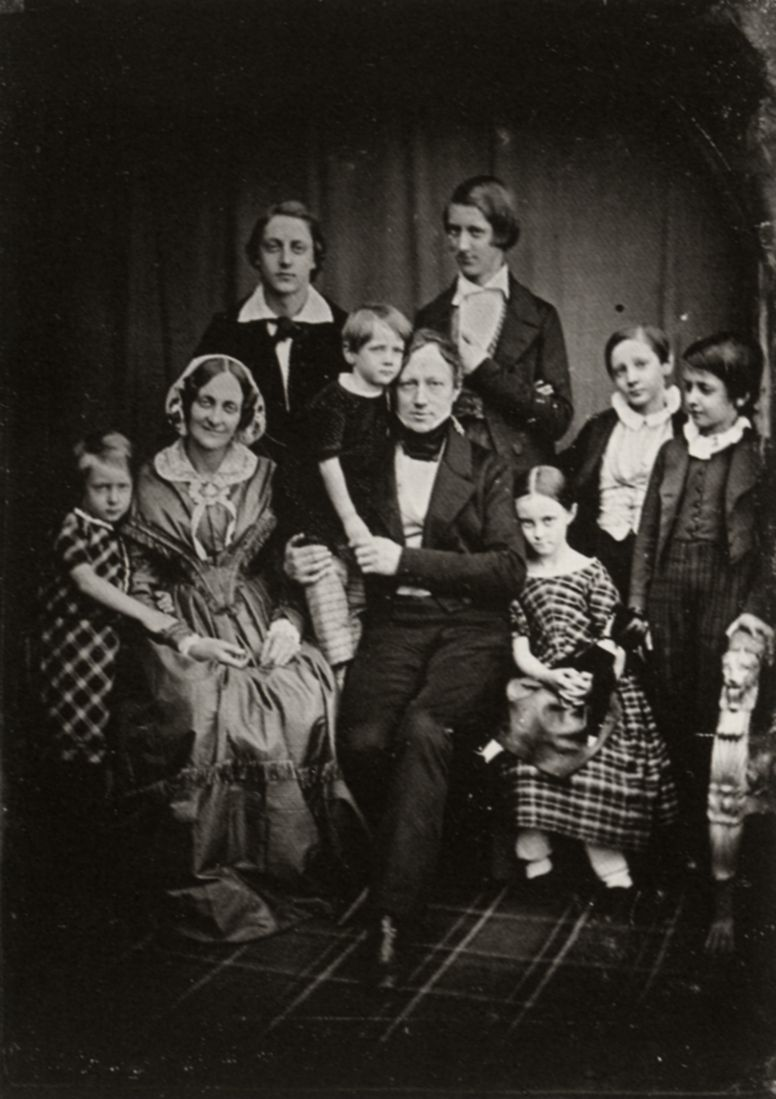
Family of Johann O.P. Bartels ca 1848

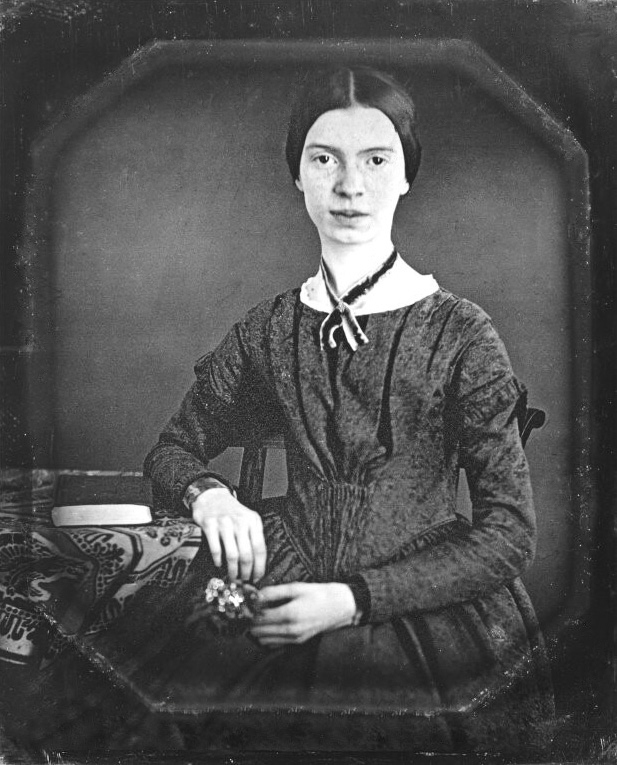
Emily Dickinson ca 1848

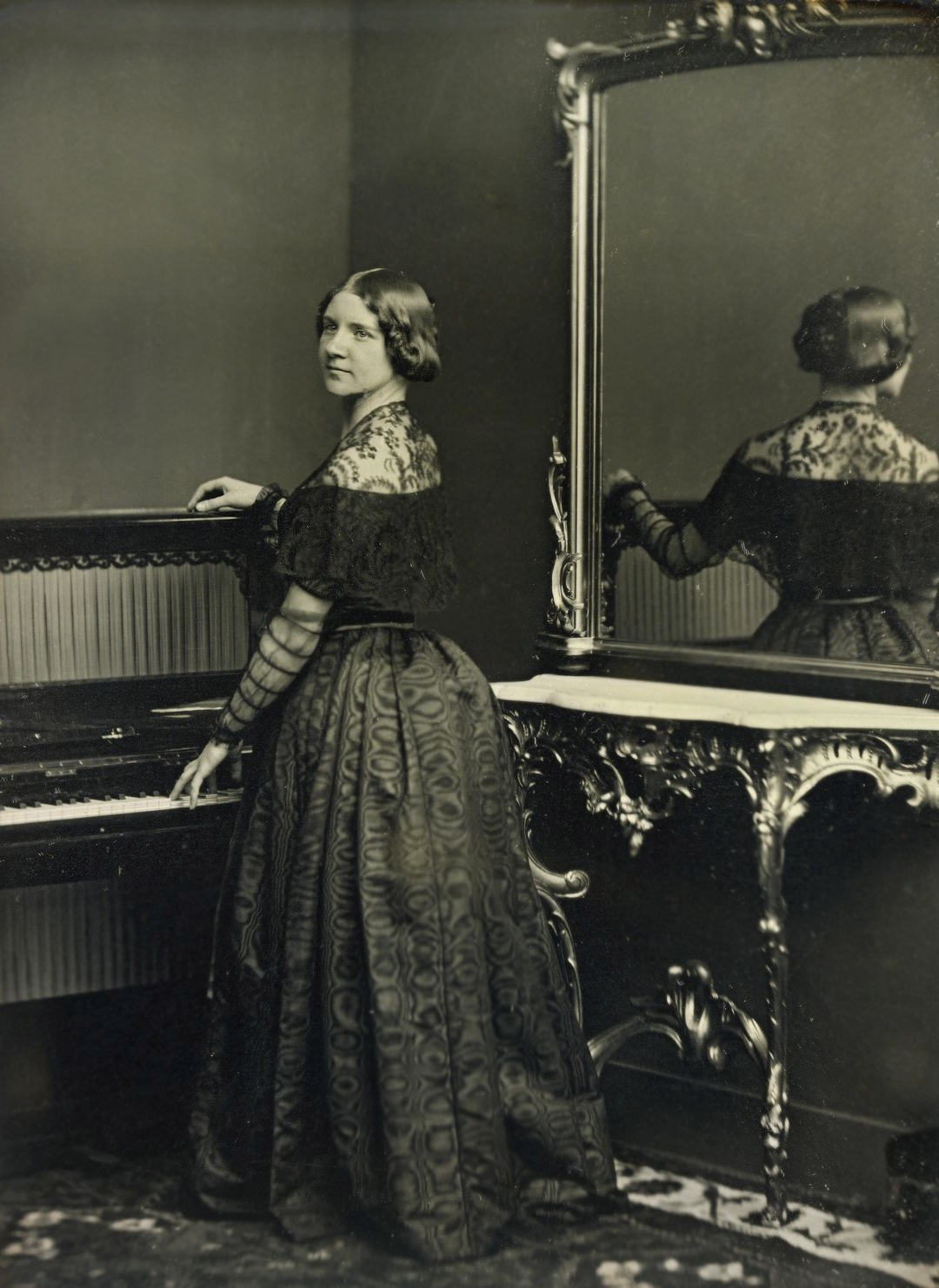
Jenny Lind, 1848

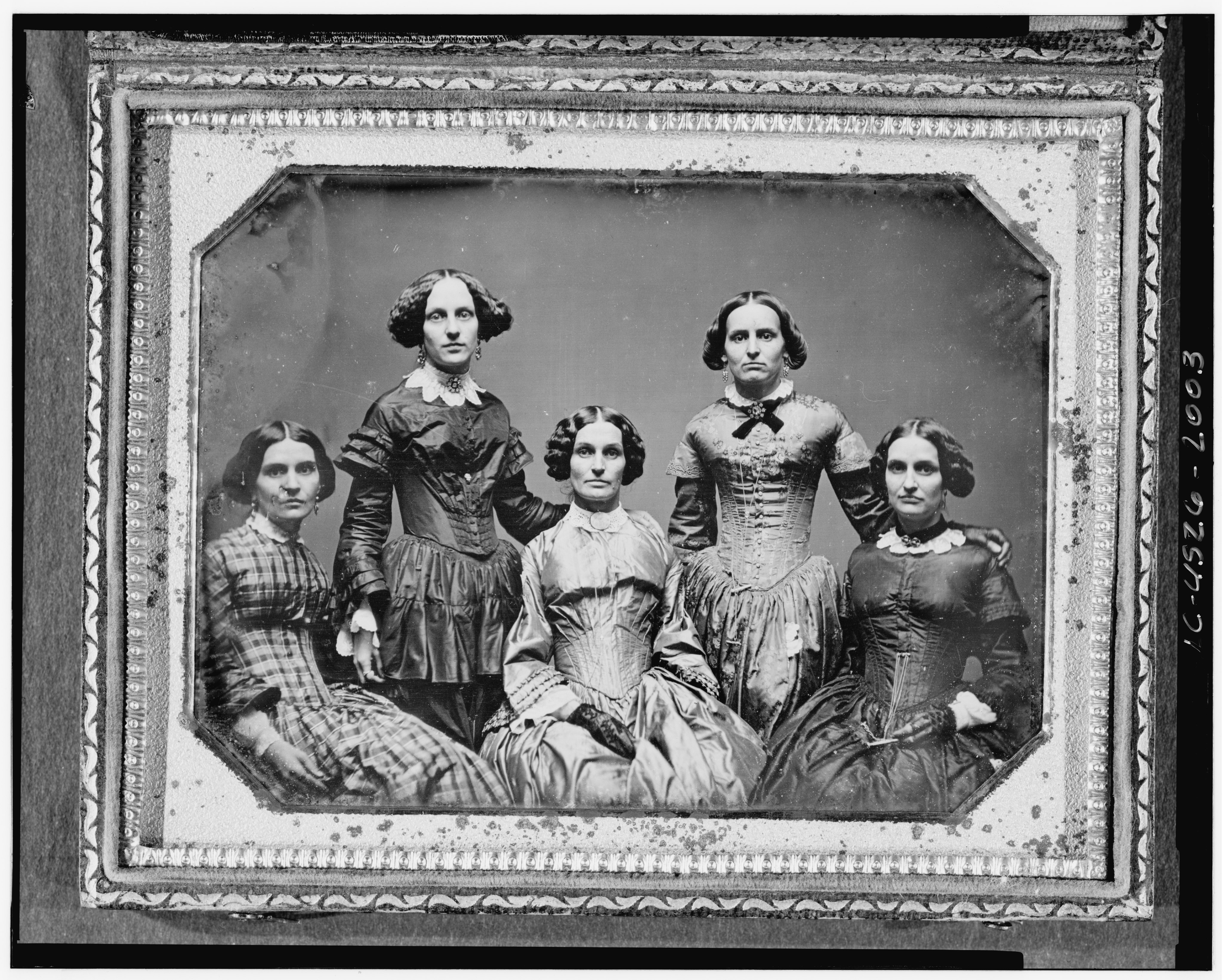
Clark Sisters ca 1848

== See also ==
- 1830s in Western fashion
- 1850s in Western fashion
- Corset controversy
- Victorian fashion
