= 1850s in sociology =

- 1840s
- 1850s in sociology
- 1860s
Other topics in 1850s:
- Fashion

The following events related to sociology occurred in the 1850s.

== 1850 ==
Events

- Karl Marx The Class Struggles in France is published.

== 1851 ==
Events

- Herbert Spencer's Social Statics is published.

== 1852 ==
Events

- Karl Marx's The Eighteenth Brumaire of Louis Bonaparte is published.

Births

- August 23: Arnold Toynbee

== 1854 ==
Events

- Auguste Comte's The System of Positive Philosophy is published.

== 1855 ==
Events

- Søren Kierkegaard's Attack Upon Christendom is published.
- Pierre Guillaume Frédéric le Play's Les Ouvriers européens is published.

== 1856 ==
Events

- Pierre Guillaume Frédéric le Play founds the Société internationale des études pratiques d'économie sociale.

== 1857 ==
Events

- Karl Marx's Grundrisse is written (but not published until 1941).

== 1859 ==
Events

- Karl Marx's A Contribution to a Critique of Political Economy is published.
