= 1850s in Western fashion =

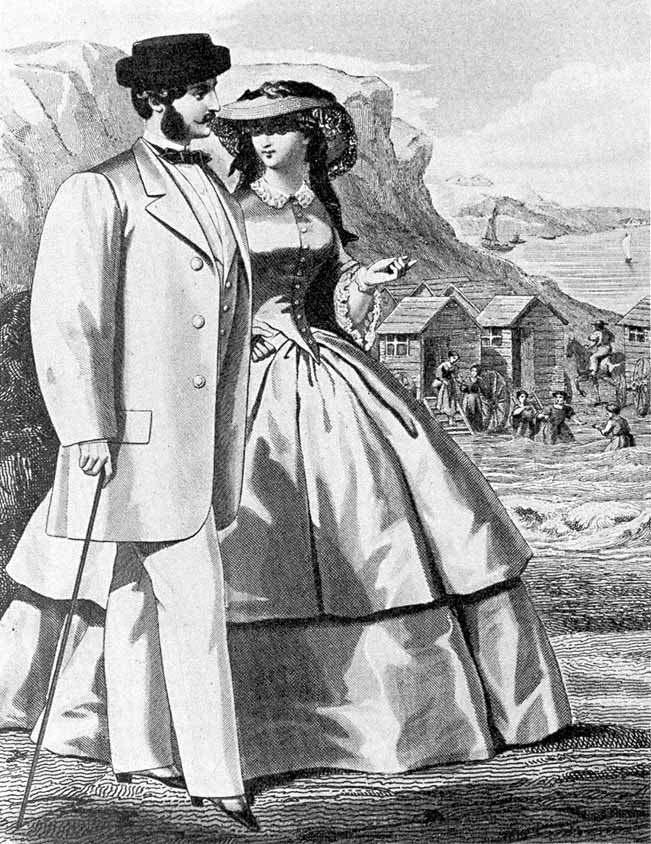
1859 fashion plate of both men's and women's daywear, with seabathing in background. He wears the new leisure fashion, the sack coat.

1850s fashion in Western and Western-influenced clothing is characterized by an increase in the width of women's skirts supported by crinolines or hoops, the mass production of sewing machines, and the beginnings of dress reform. Masculine styles began to originate more in London, while female fashions originated almost exclusively in Paris.

== Women's fashion ==
=== Gowns ===
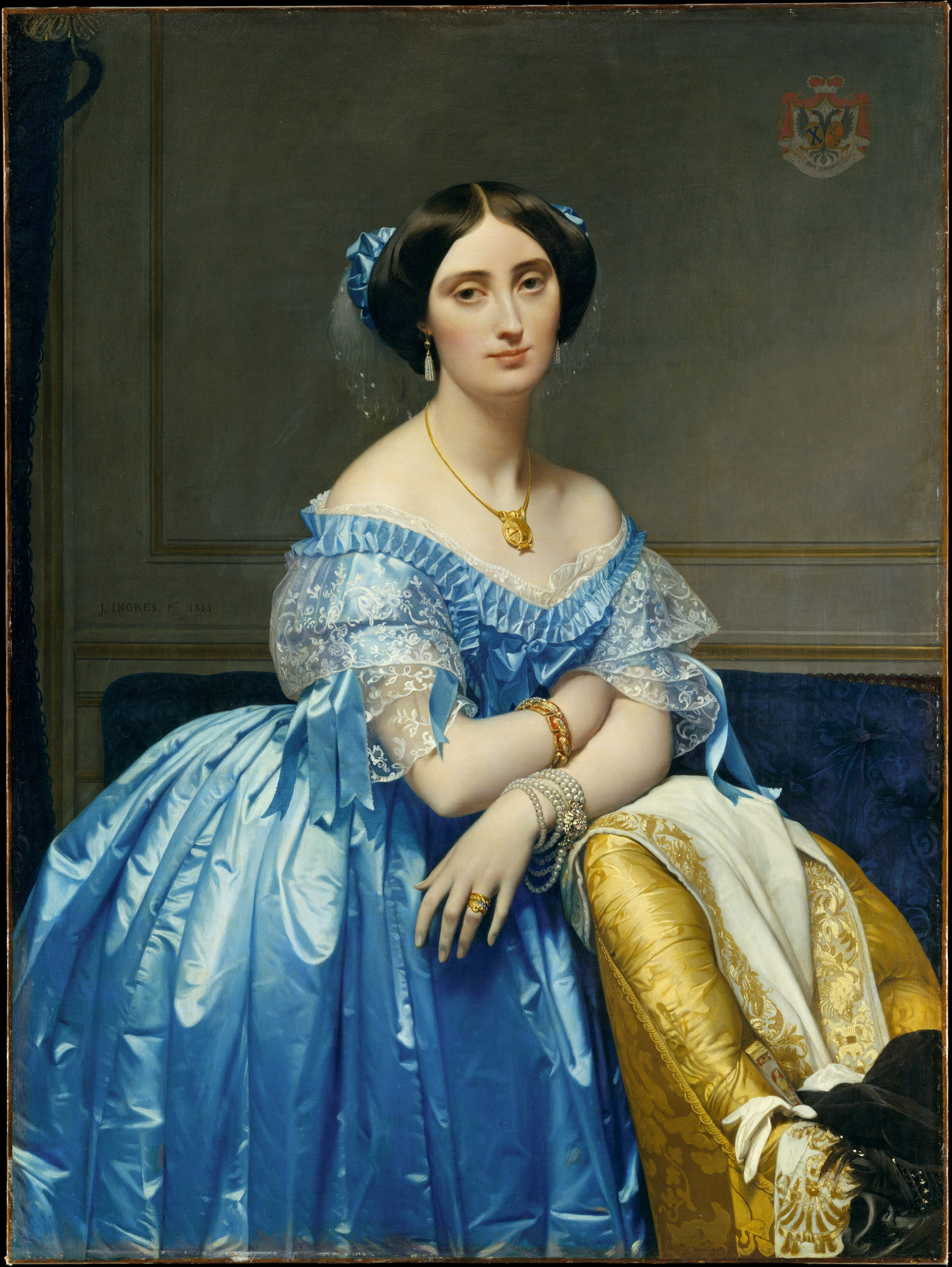
The Princesse de Broglie wears a blue silk gown with delicate lace and ribbon trim. Her hair is covered with a sheer frill trimmed with matching blue ribbon knots. She wears a necklace, tasseled earrings, and bracelets on each wrist.

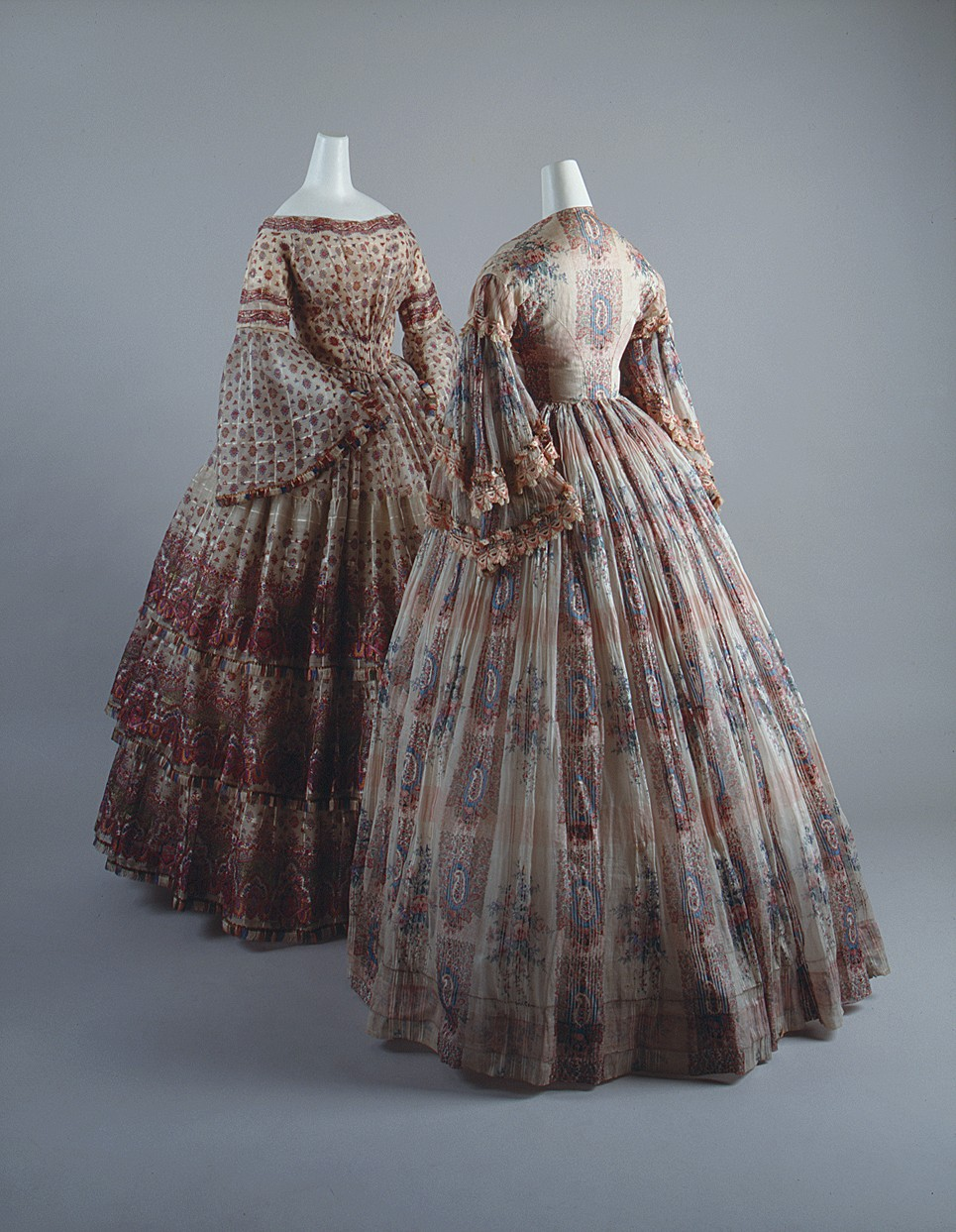
Two cotton afternoon dresses from c. 1855.

In the 1850s, the domed skirts of the 1840s continued to expand. Skirts were made fuller by means of flounces (deep ruffles), usually in tiers of three, gathered tightly at the top and stiffened with horsehair braid at the bottom.

Early in the decade, bodices of morning dresses featured panels over the shoulder that were gathered into a blunt point at the slightly dropped waist. These bodices generally fastened in back by means of hooks and eyes, but a new fashion for a [jacket] bodice appeared as well, buttoned in front and worn over a chemisette. Wider bell-shaped or pagoda sleeves were worn over false undersleeves or engageantes of cotton or linen, trimmed in lace, broderie anglaise, or other fancy-work. Separate small collars of lace, tatting, or crochet-work were worn with morning dresses, sometimes with a ribbon bow.

Gowns were very low-necked, off-the-shoulder, and had short sleeves.

The introduction of the steel cage crinoline in 1856 provided a means for expanding the skirt still further, and flounces gradually disappeared in favor of a skirt lying more smoothly over the petticoat and hoops. Pantalettes were essential under this new fashion for modesty's sake.

=== Fabrics ===
The fabrics were made commonly of linen and now more widely available cotton, and also could be made of such materials as silk or wool, though the former two plants were most widespread.

=== Outerwear ===
Cape-like jackets were worn over the very wide skirts. Another fashionable outer garment was an Indian shawl or one woven in Paisley, Renfrewshire in a paisley pattern in imitation of Indian styles. Hooded cloaks were also worn.

Riding habits had fitted jackets with tight sleeves, worn over a collared shirt or (more often) chemisette. They were worn with long skirts and mannish top hats.

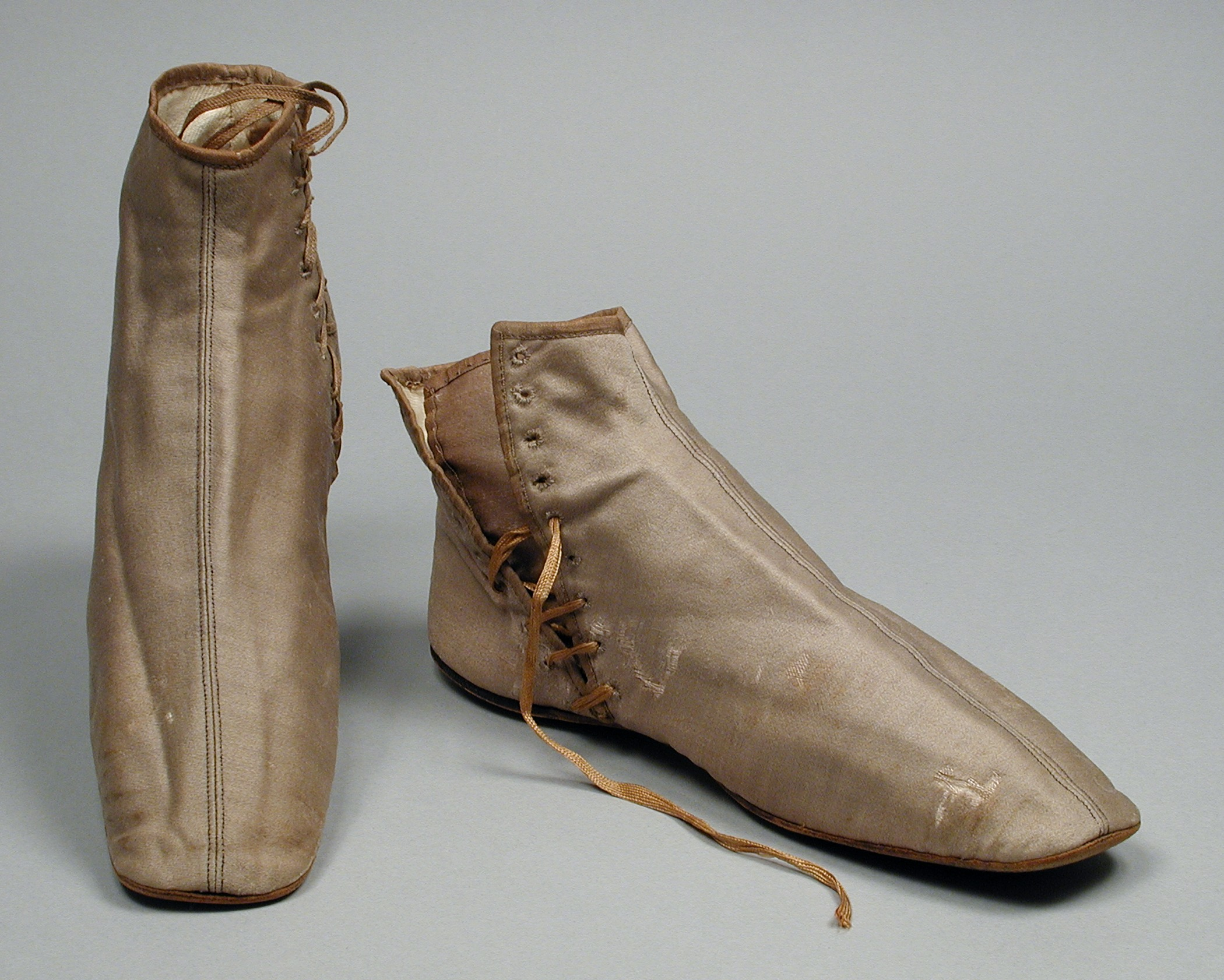
Pair of Girl's Ankle Boots c. 1850.

=== Hairstyles and headgear ===
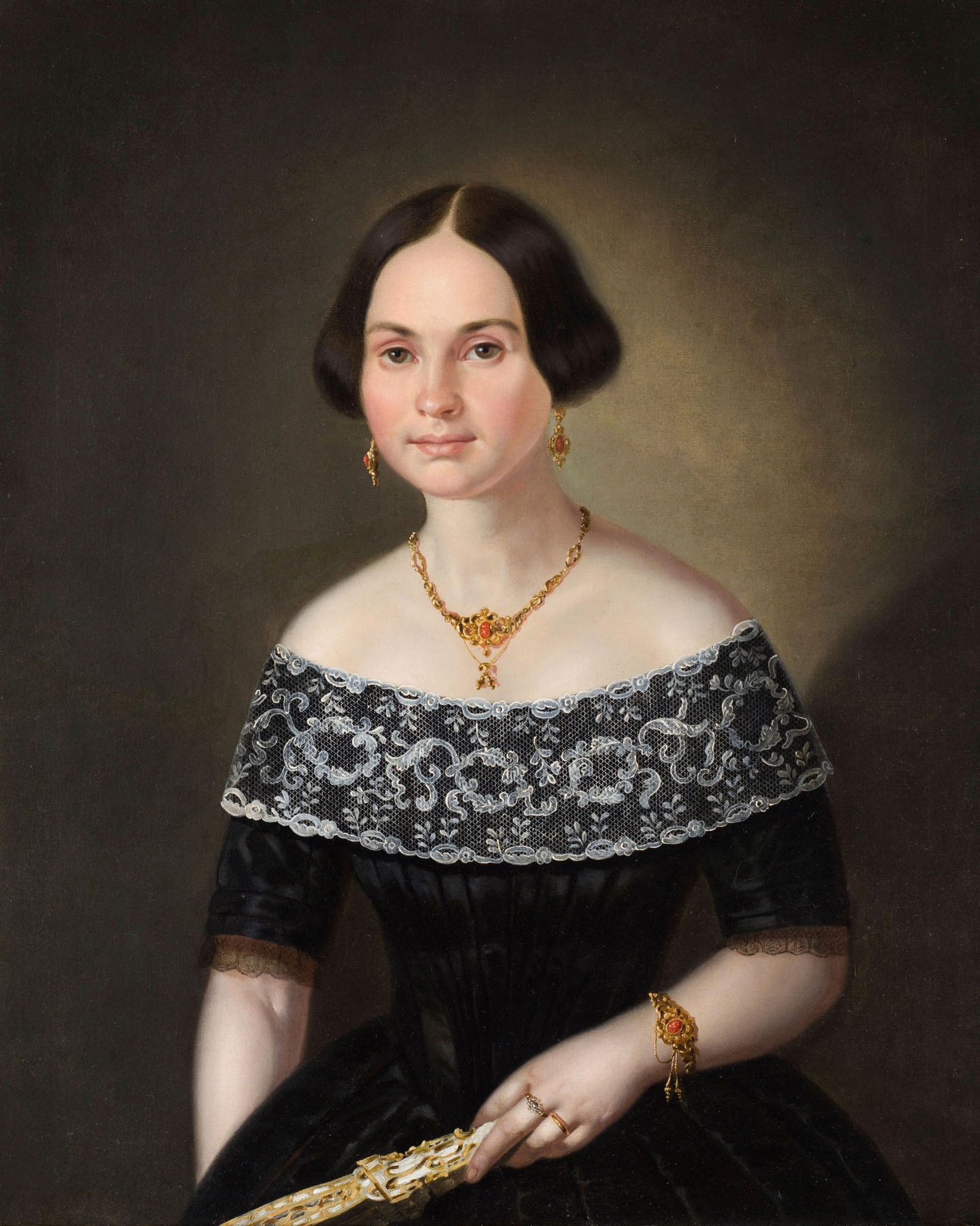
The hair was middle parted with the sides puffed, 1850.

Hair was dressed simply, middle parted and in a bun or wound braid at the back, with the sides puffed out over the ears or with clusters of curls to either side in imitation of early 17th century fashions.

The indoor cap became little more than a lace and ribbon frill worn on the back of the head.

=== Beginnings of dress reform ===
1851 marked the birth of the Victorian dress reform movement, when New England temperance activist Libby Miller adopted what she considered a more rational costume: loose trousers gathered at the ankles, topped by a short dress or skirt hemmed just below the knees. The style was promoted by editor Amelia Bloomer and was immediately christened a Bloomer suit by the press. Despite its practicality, the Bloomer suit was the subject of much ridicule in the press and had little impact on mainstream fashion.

=== Style gallery 1850–1854 ===
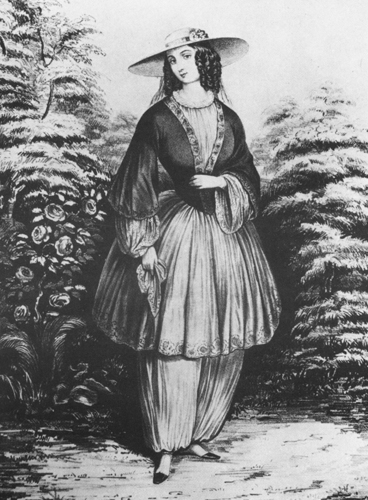
1 – 1850s

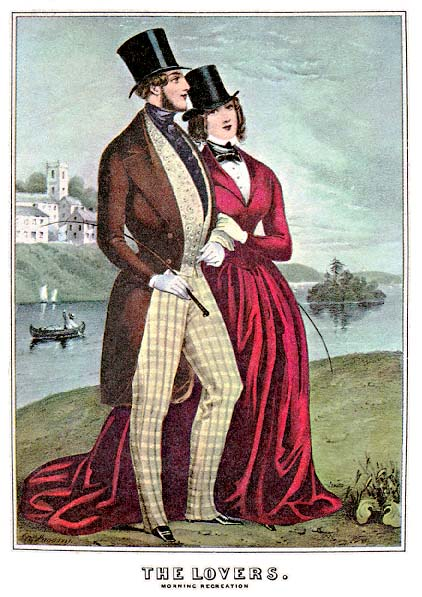
2 – 1850

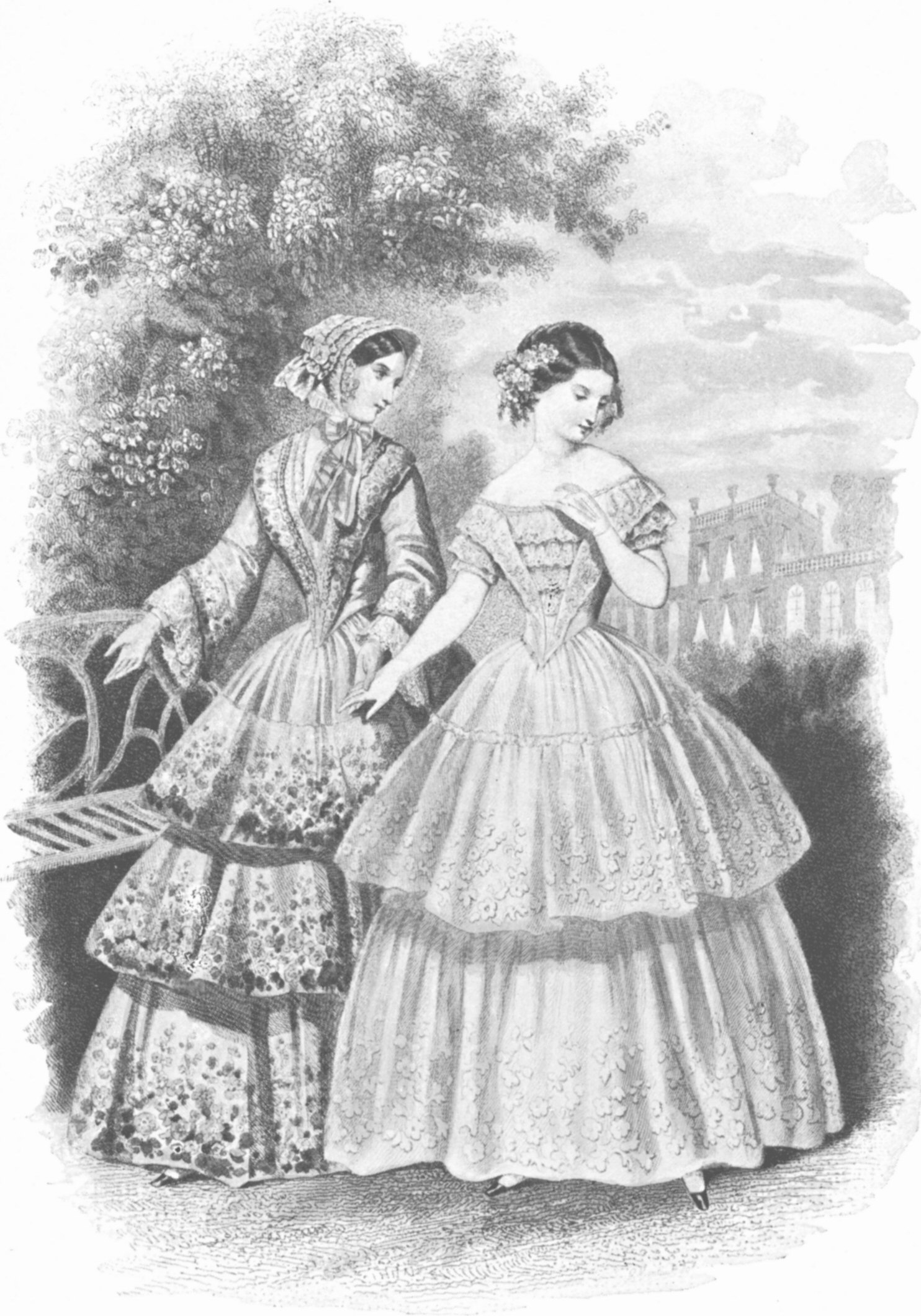
3 – 1851

4 – 1851

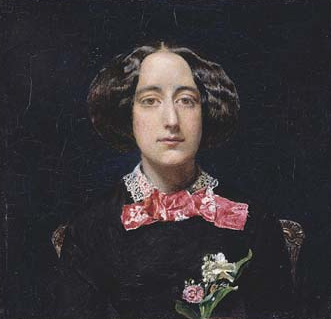
5 – 1851

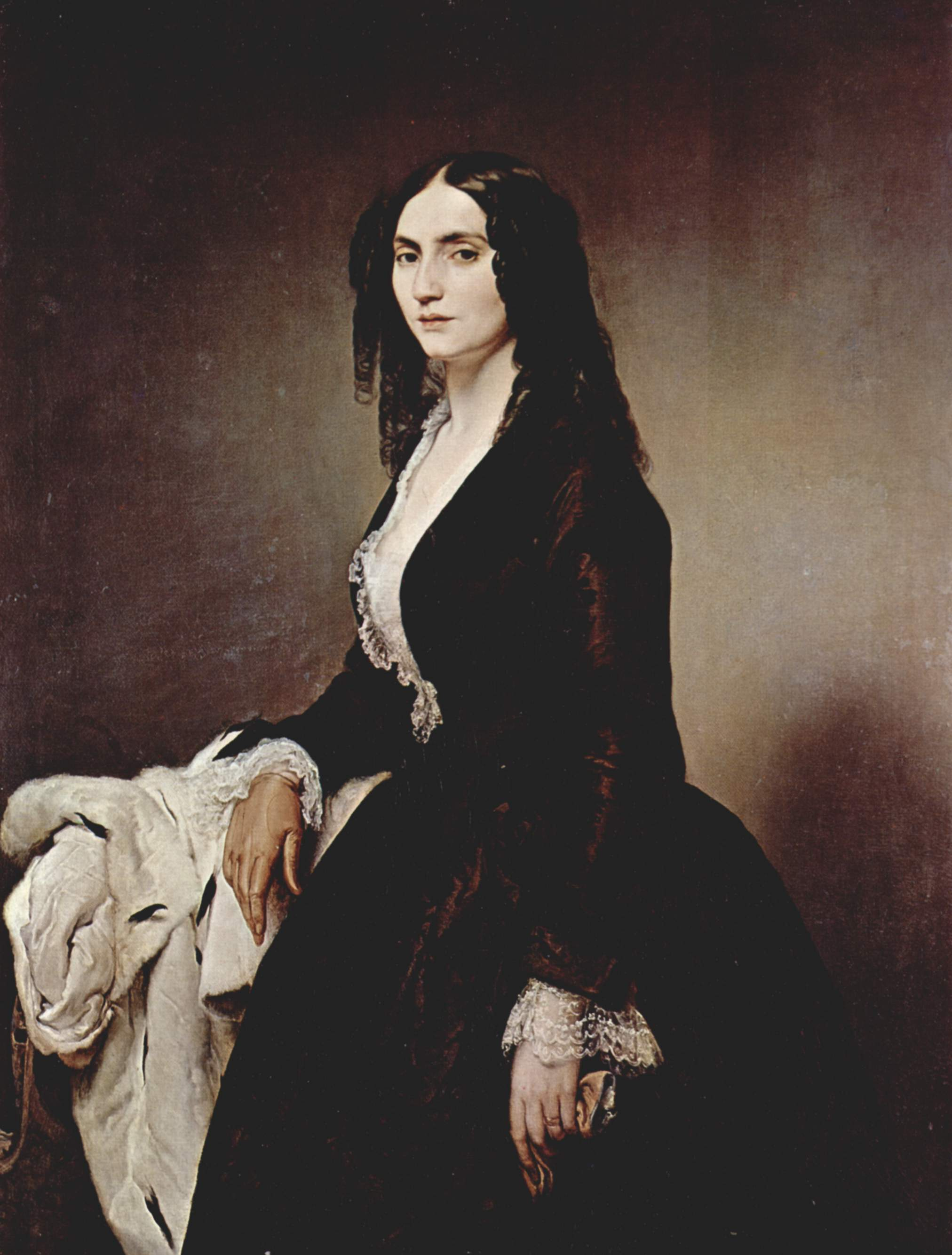
6 – 1851

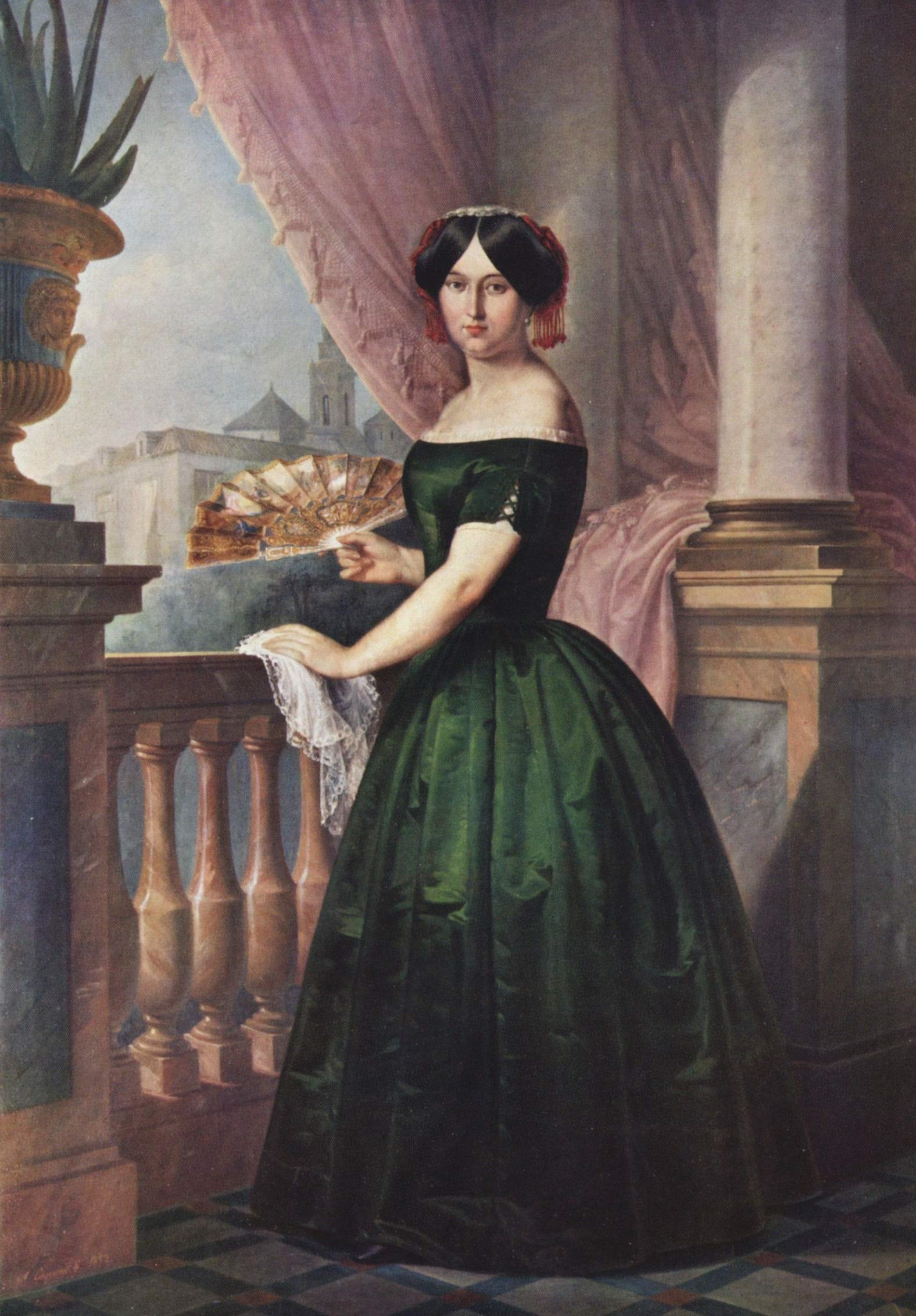
7 – 1852

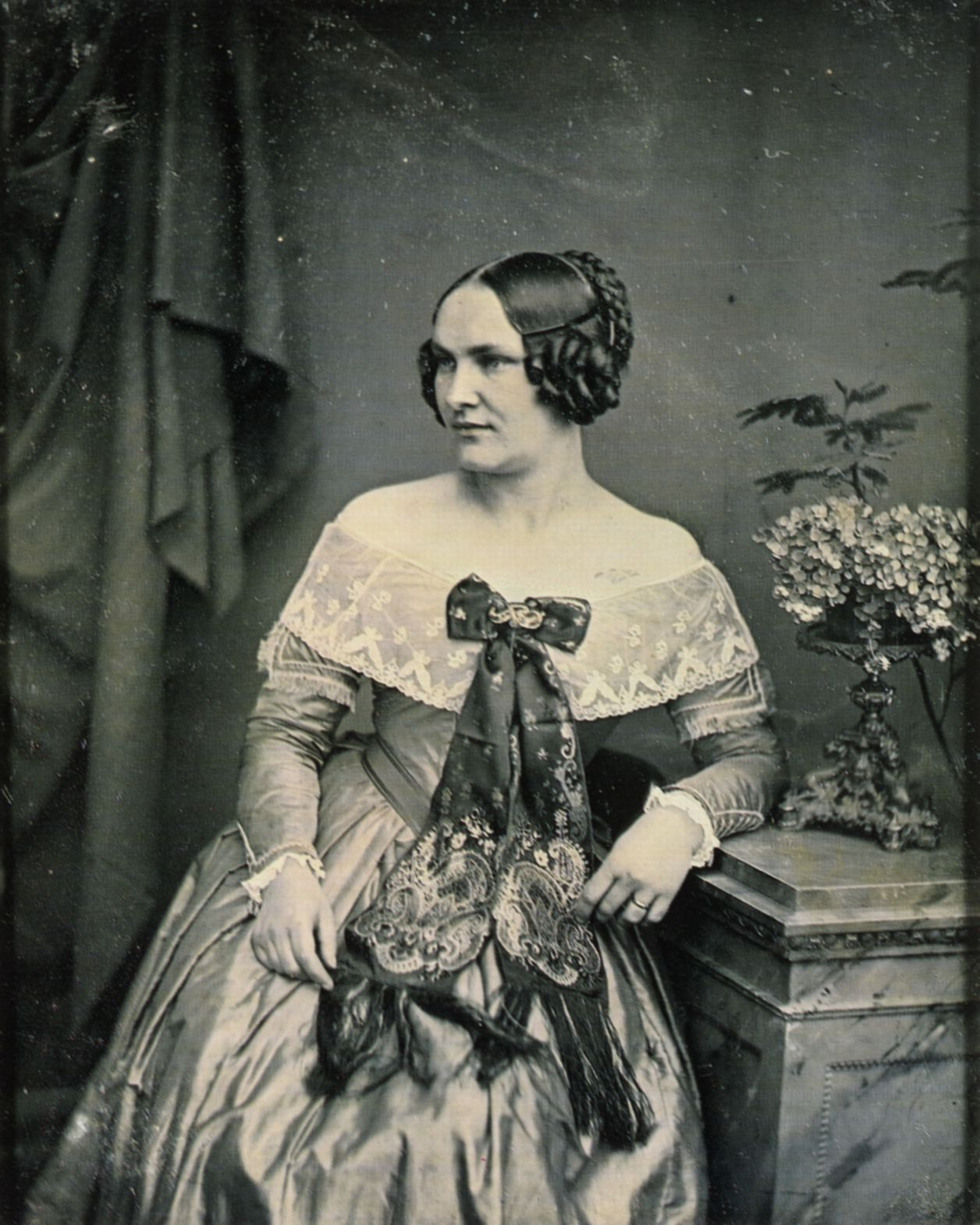
8 – 1852

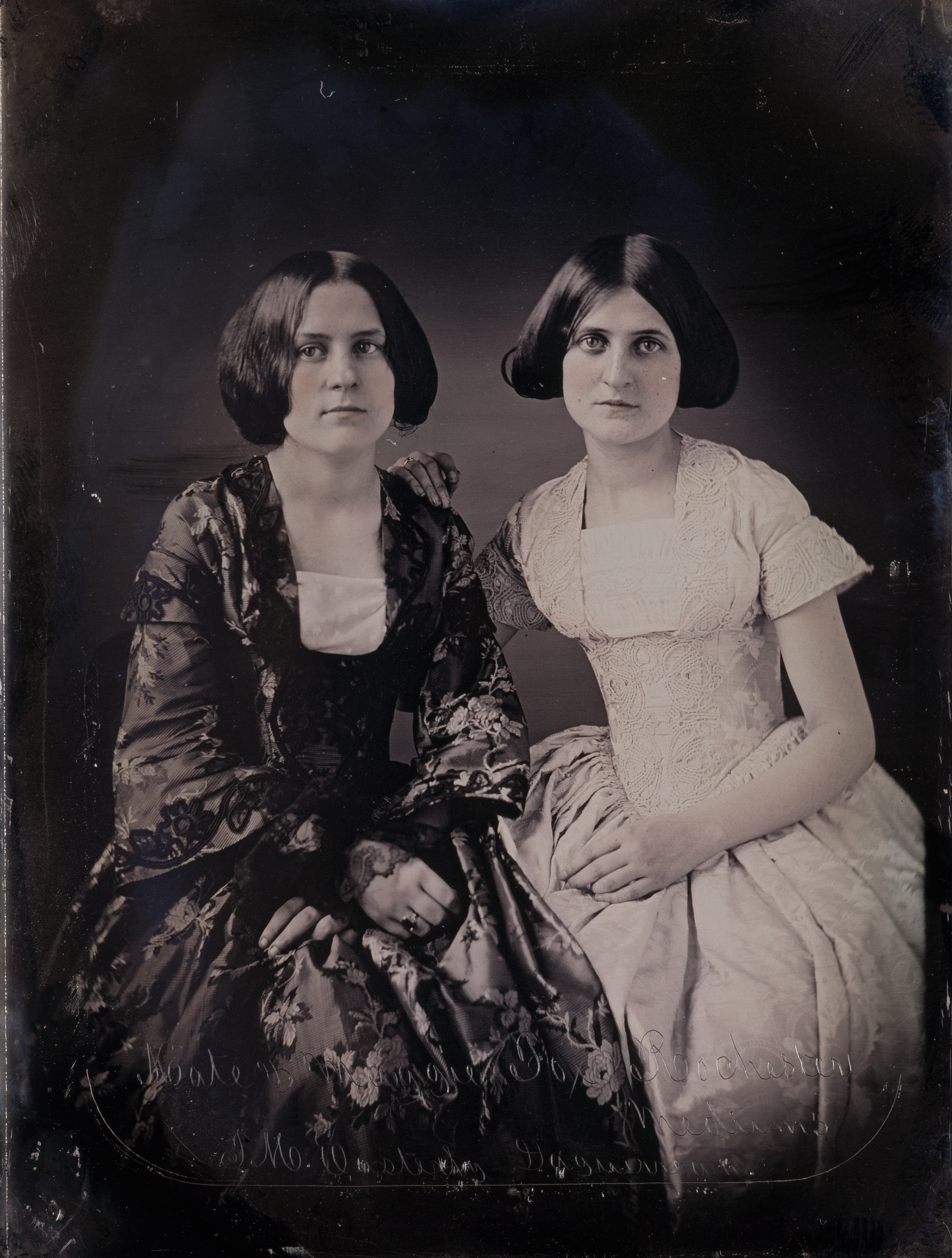
9 – 1852

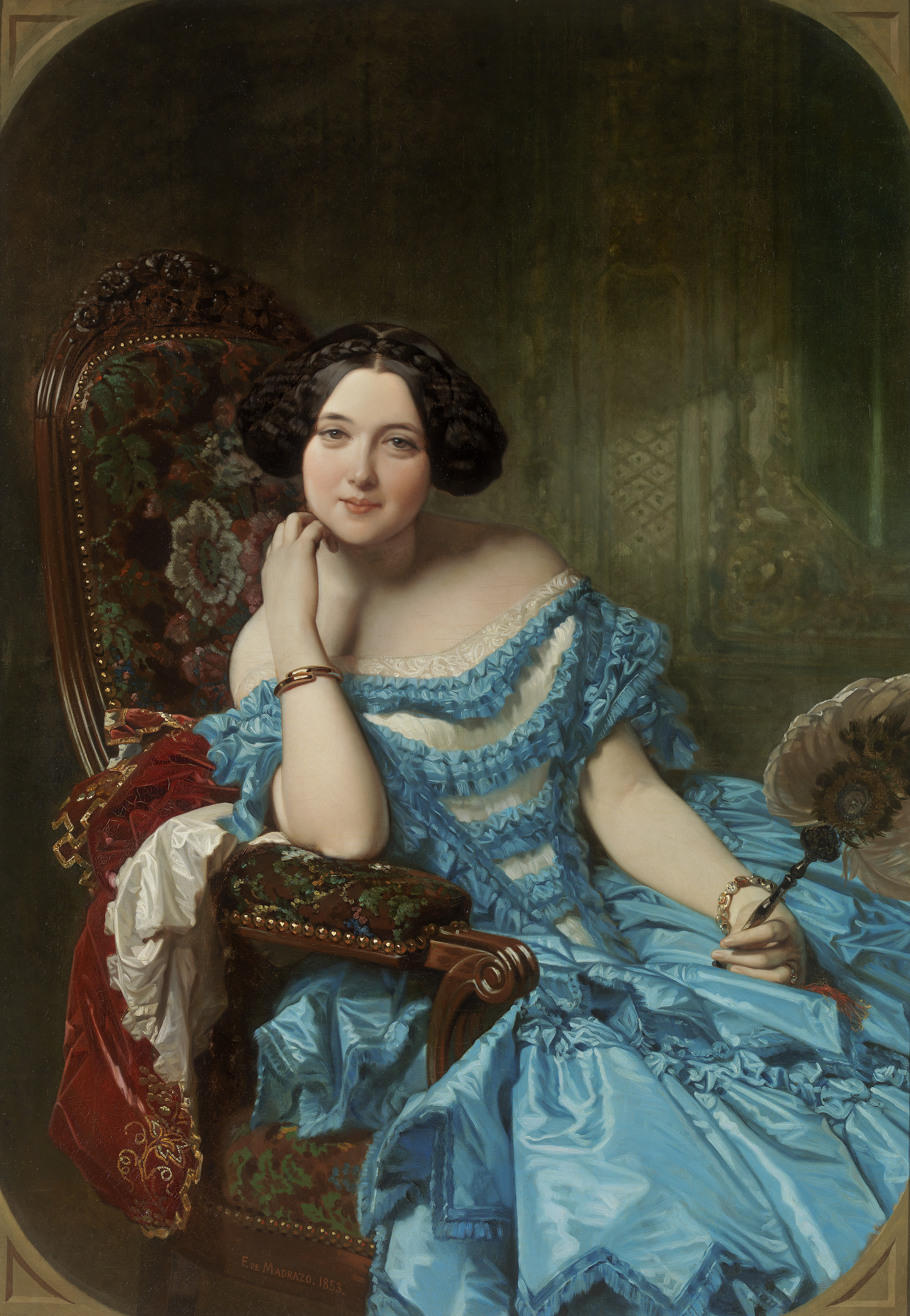
10 – 1853

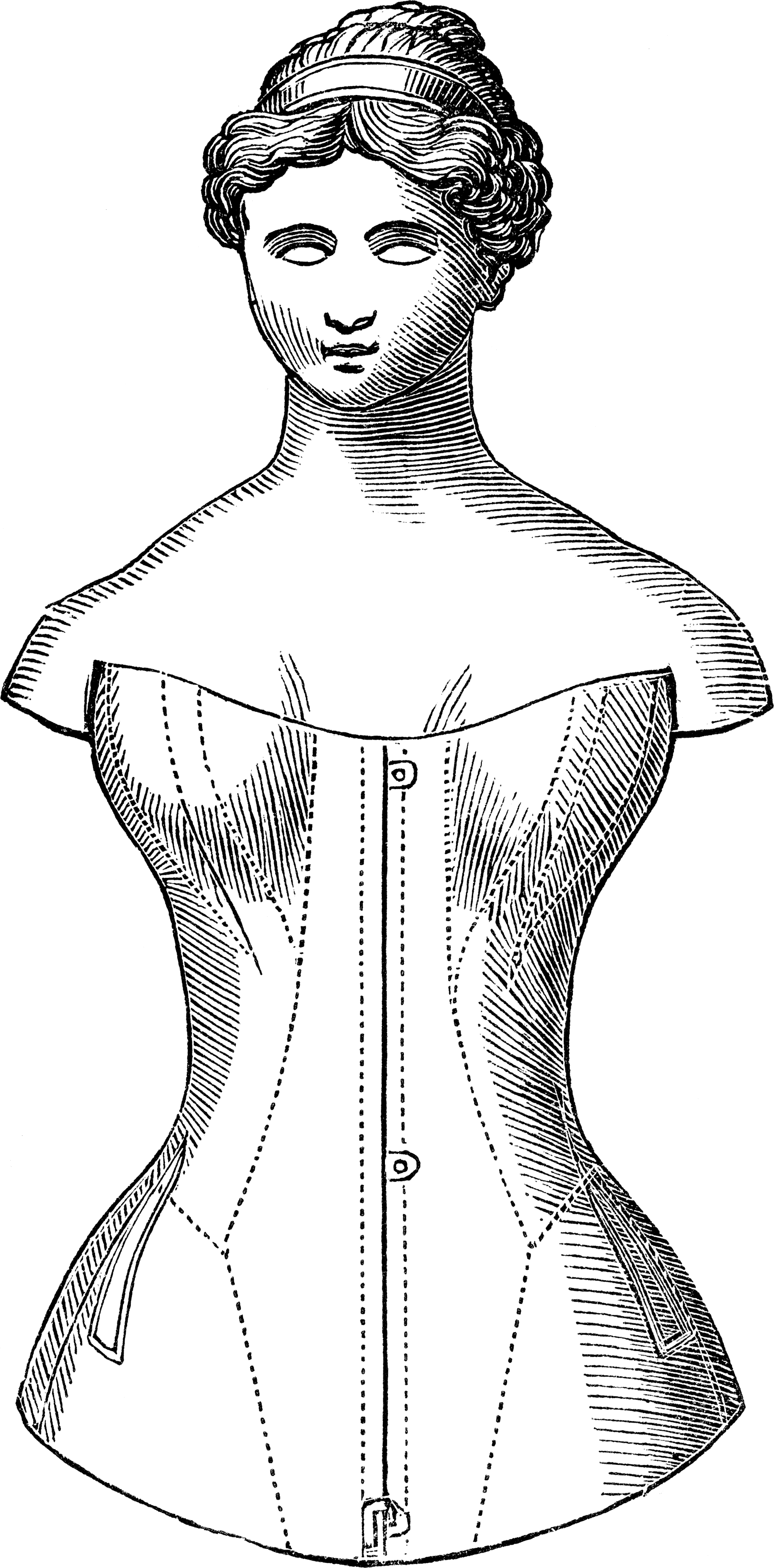
11 – 1854

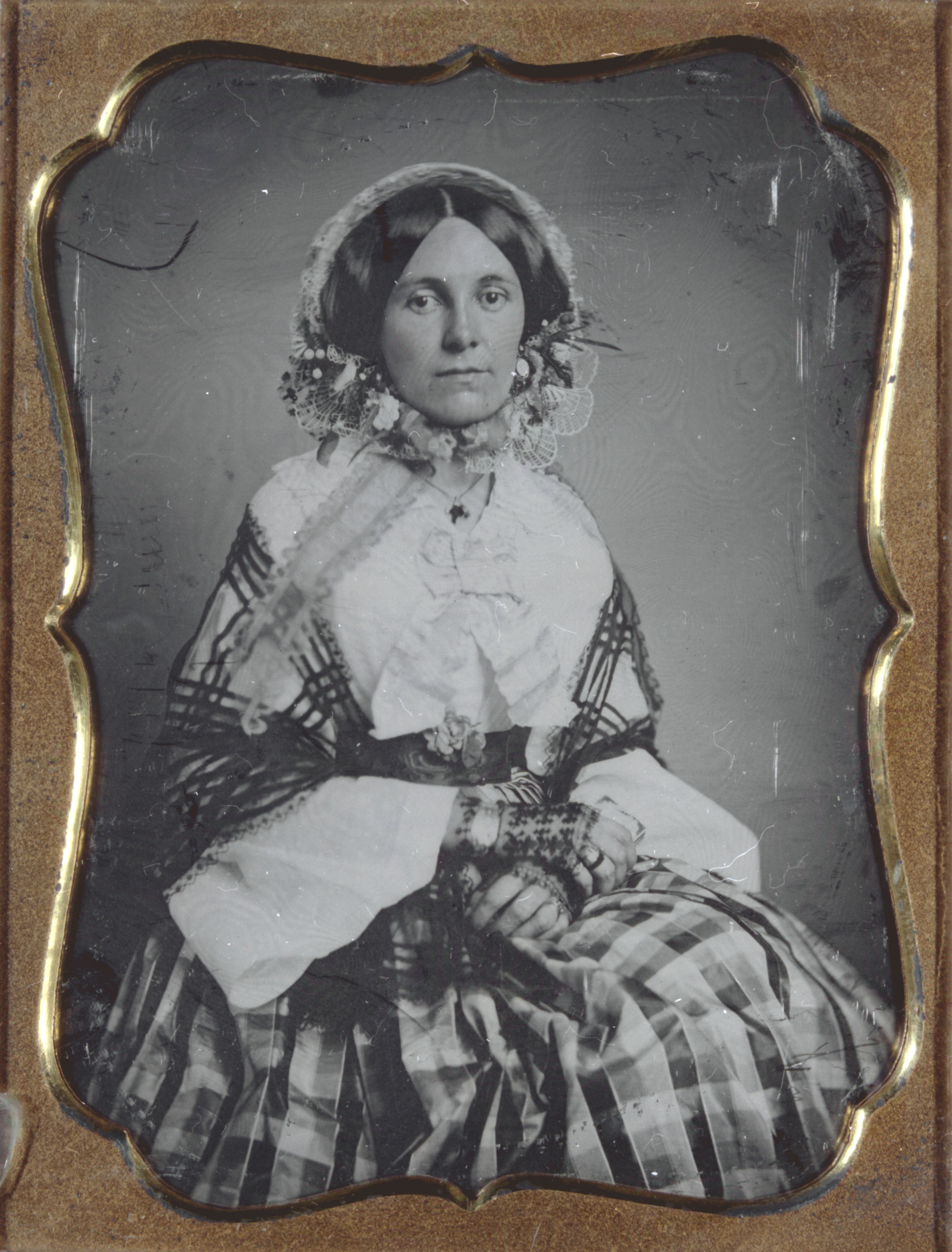
12 – 1854

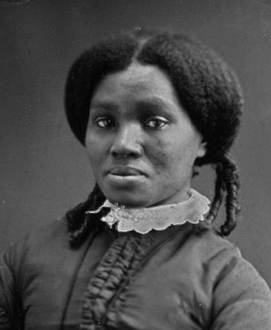
13 – ca 1855
1. The Bloomer suit, a short dress worn over full trousers gathered at the ankle, briefly adopted by dress reformers in the United States in the 1850s.
2. Male outdoors attire and female riding-habit of 1850 (New York).
3. 1851 Parisian fashion plate shows the fashionable use of fabrics printed â la disposition (with border-prints) on skirt flounces and for bodices and sleeves.
4. Madame Moitessier wears a black off-the-shoulder gown with ruffles. She wears a brooch and bracelets on both wrists. France, 1851.
5. Mrs. Coventry Patmore wears a small fancy-work collar and a ribbon at her throat. Her thick, wavy hair is parted in the center and poufed over her ears, 1851.
6. Matilde Juva-Branca wears a dark morning dress with a lace blouse or chemisette and cuffs and short leather gloves. Her hair is parted and worn in long sausage curls, 1851.
7. Doña Josefa García Solis wears a simple green satin dress with laced short sleeves over a linen chemise or chemisette. Her lace cap is trimmed with rose-colored tassels and ribbons, and she carries an elaborate fan, 1852.
8. Anna Henriette Stelzner wears a low cut lace trimmed silk dress with an elaborated bow ornament, 1852.
9. Two teenaged girls Maggie and Kate Fox, 1852.
10. Doña Amalie de Llano y Dotres, Condesa de Vilches wears a bright blue dress with a tiered skirt. The long pointed bodice is trimmed with horizontal bands of ruching over a chemise or chemisette (or an underlayer styled to look like a chemise), 1853.
11. A reform corset from Madame Caplin. This corset was adjusted to the body, not to the dress as before.
12. Mrs. Cora Vail with a bonnet and gloves and a shawl around her shoulders.
13. African American woman with Afro-textured hair.

=== Style gallery 1855–1859 ===
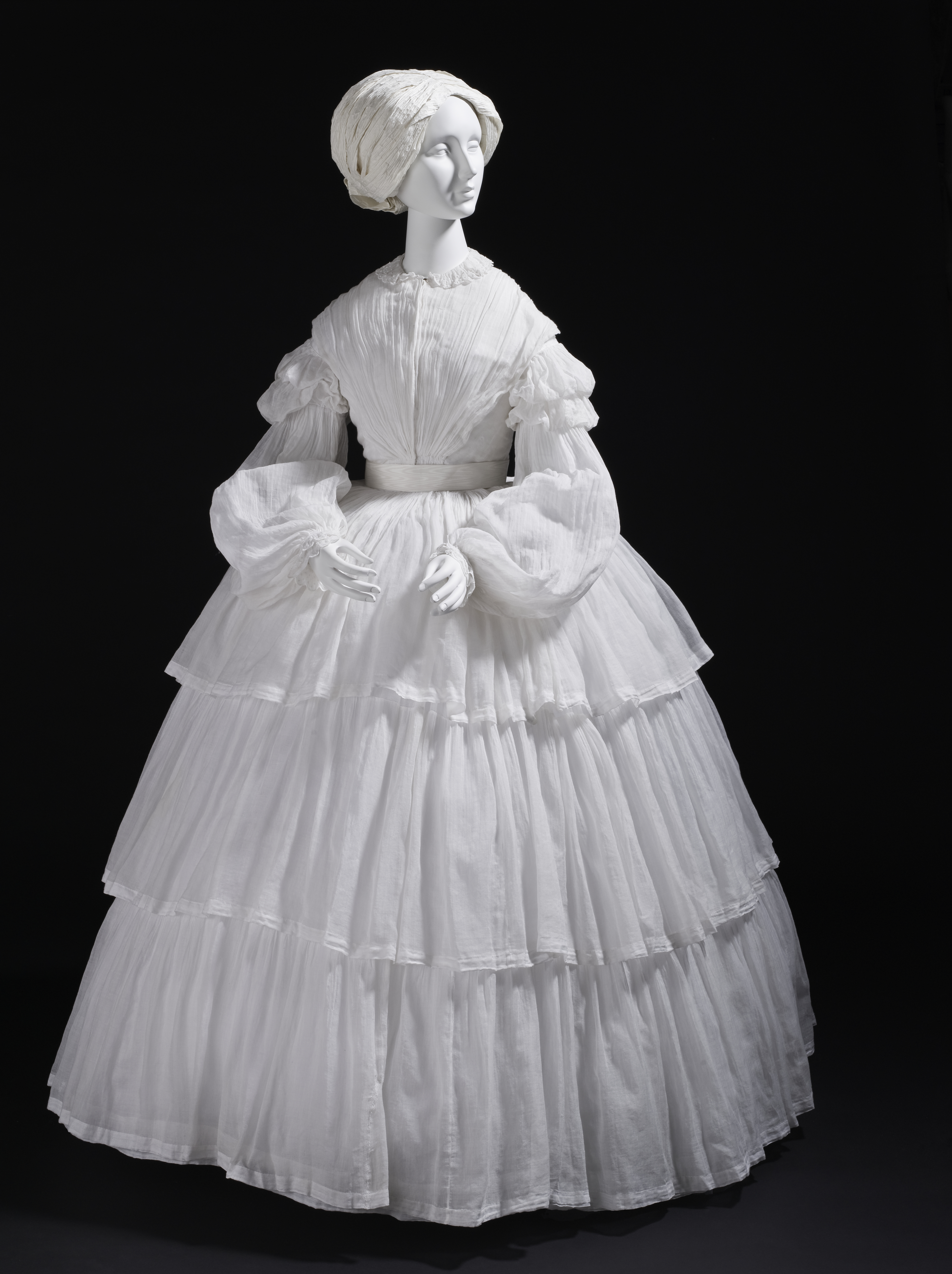
1 – c. 1855

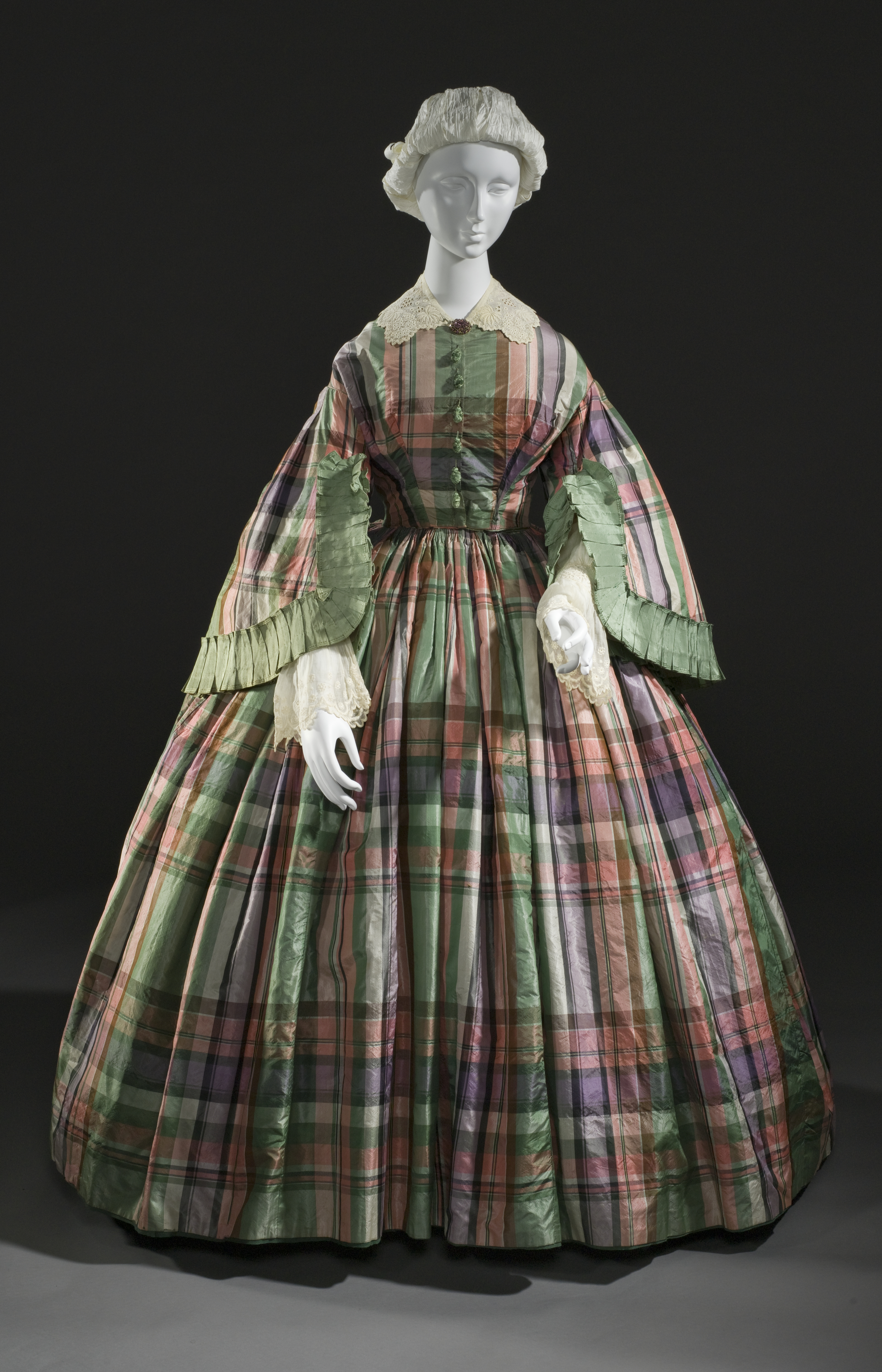
2 – c. 1855

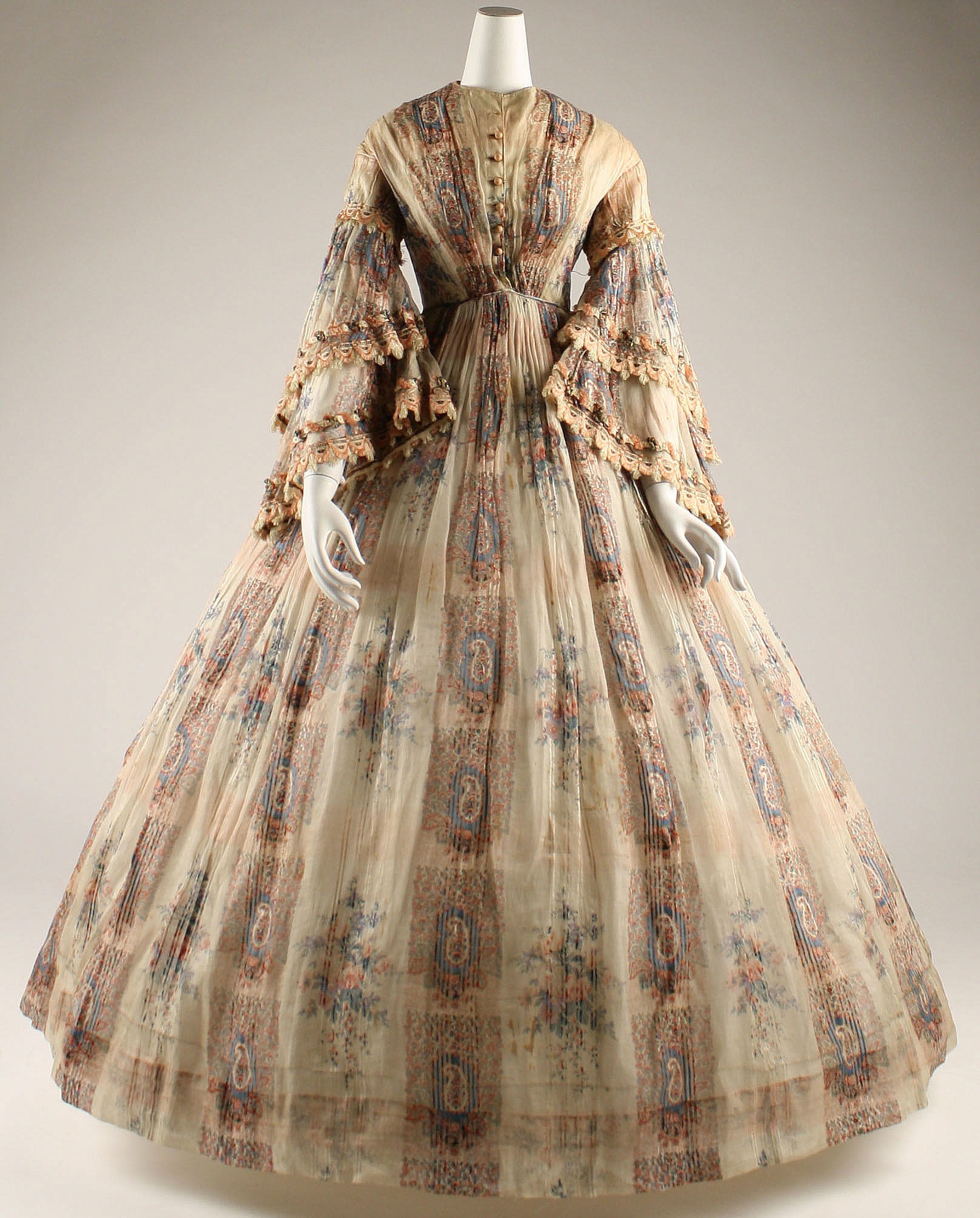
3 – c. 1855

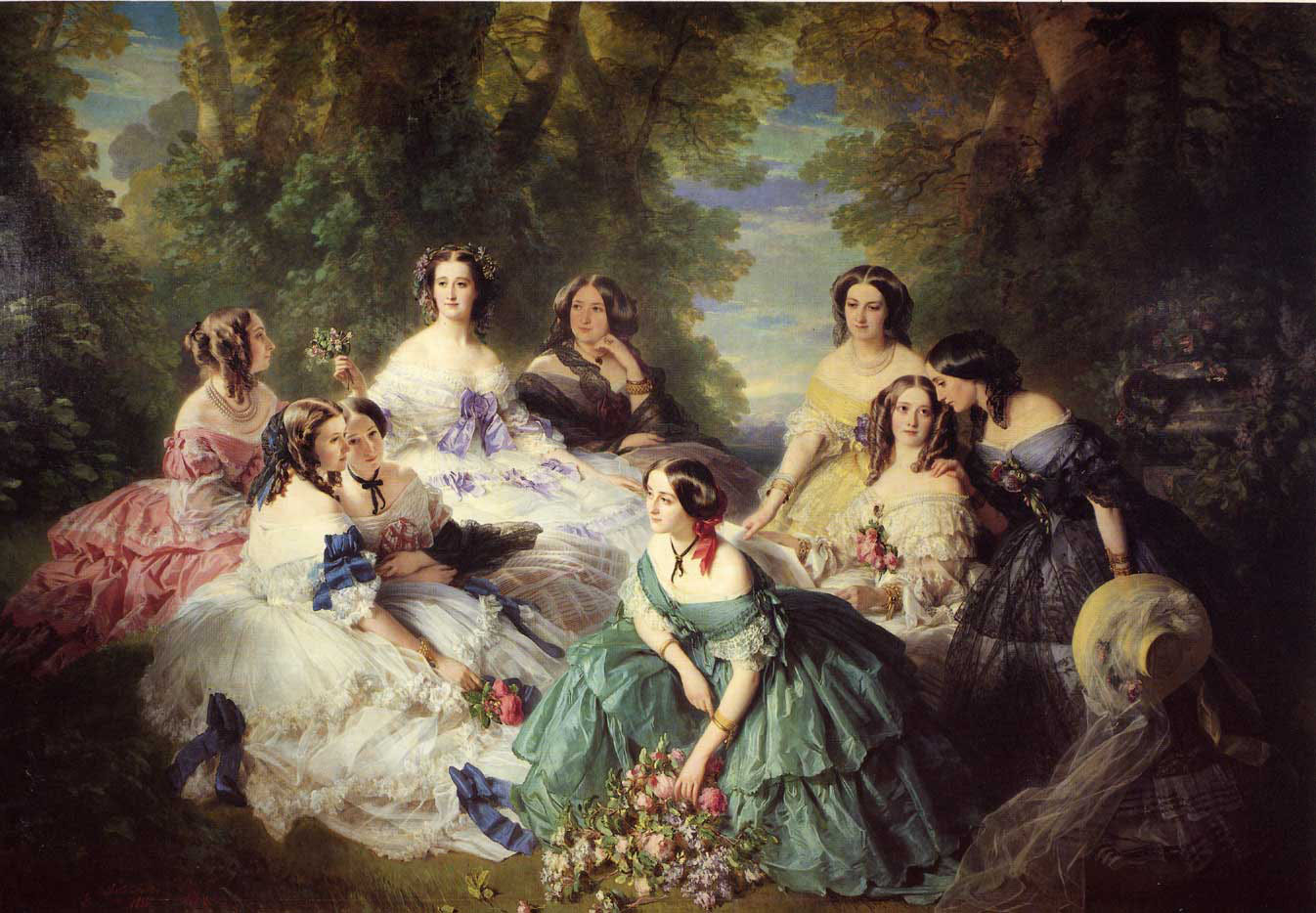
4 – 1855

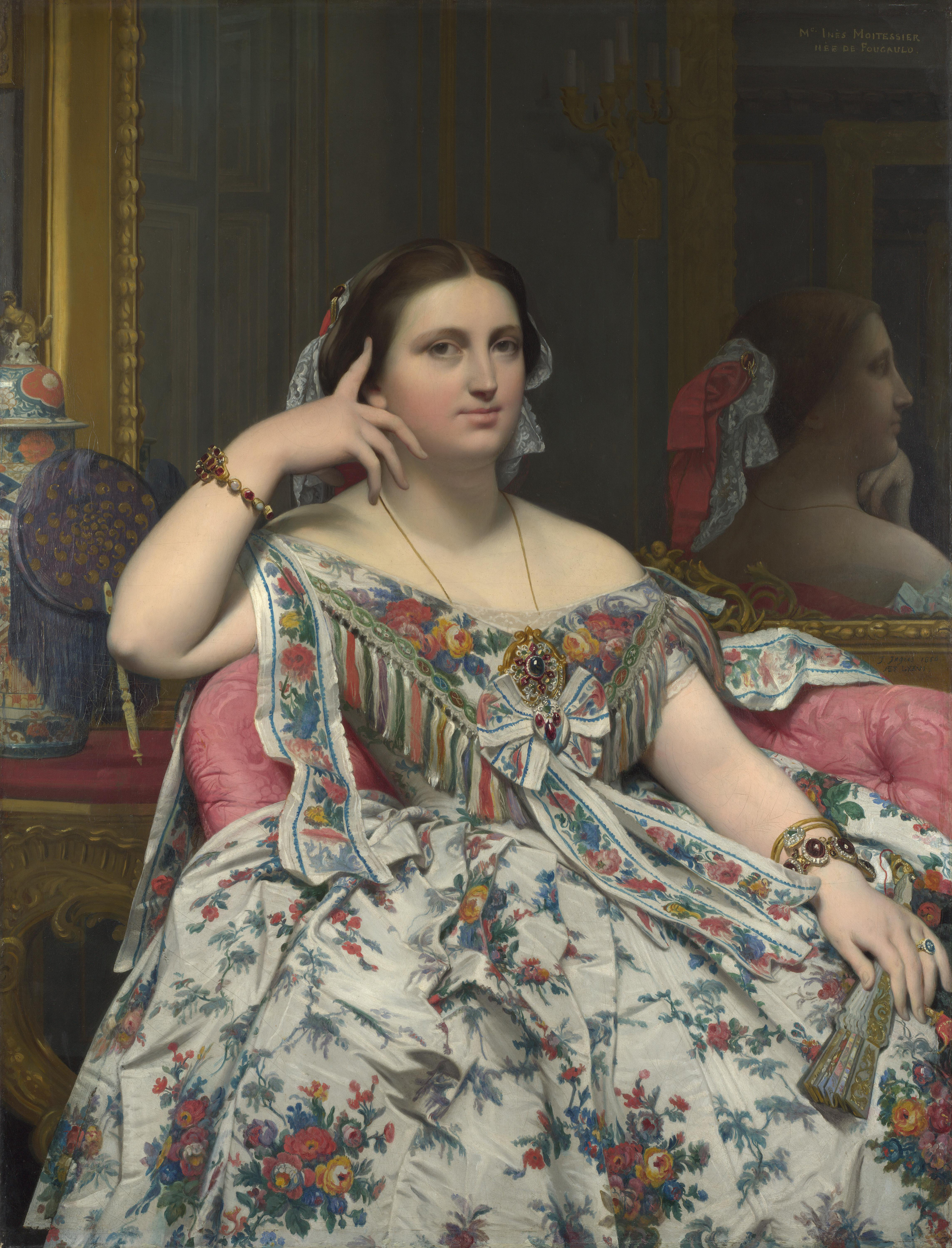
5 – 1856

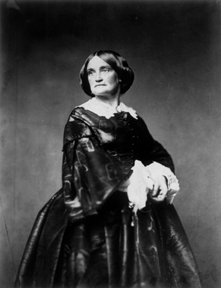
6 – 1857

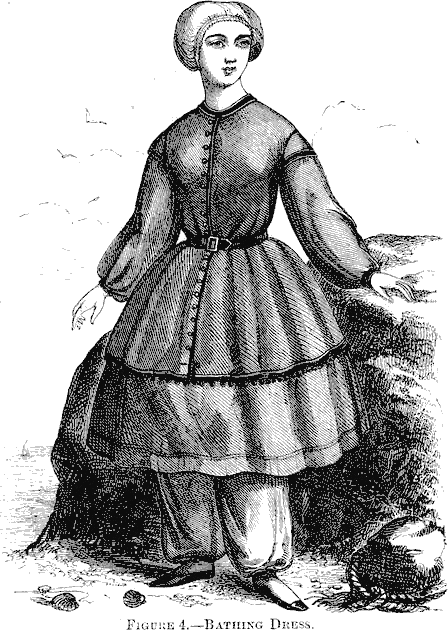
7 – 1858 bathing

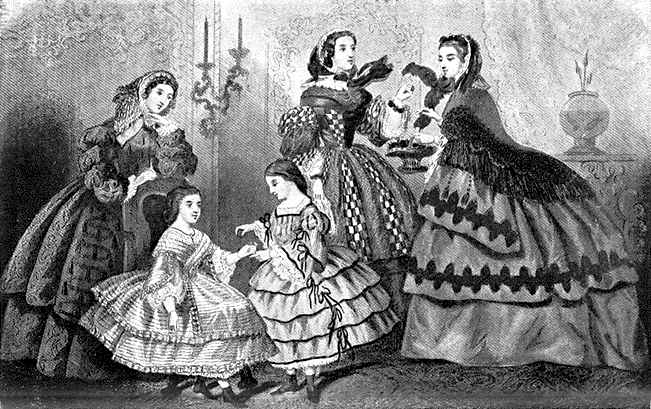
8 – 1859

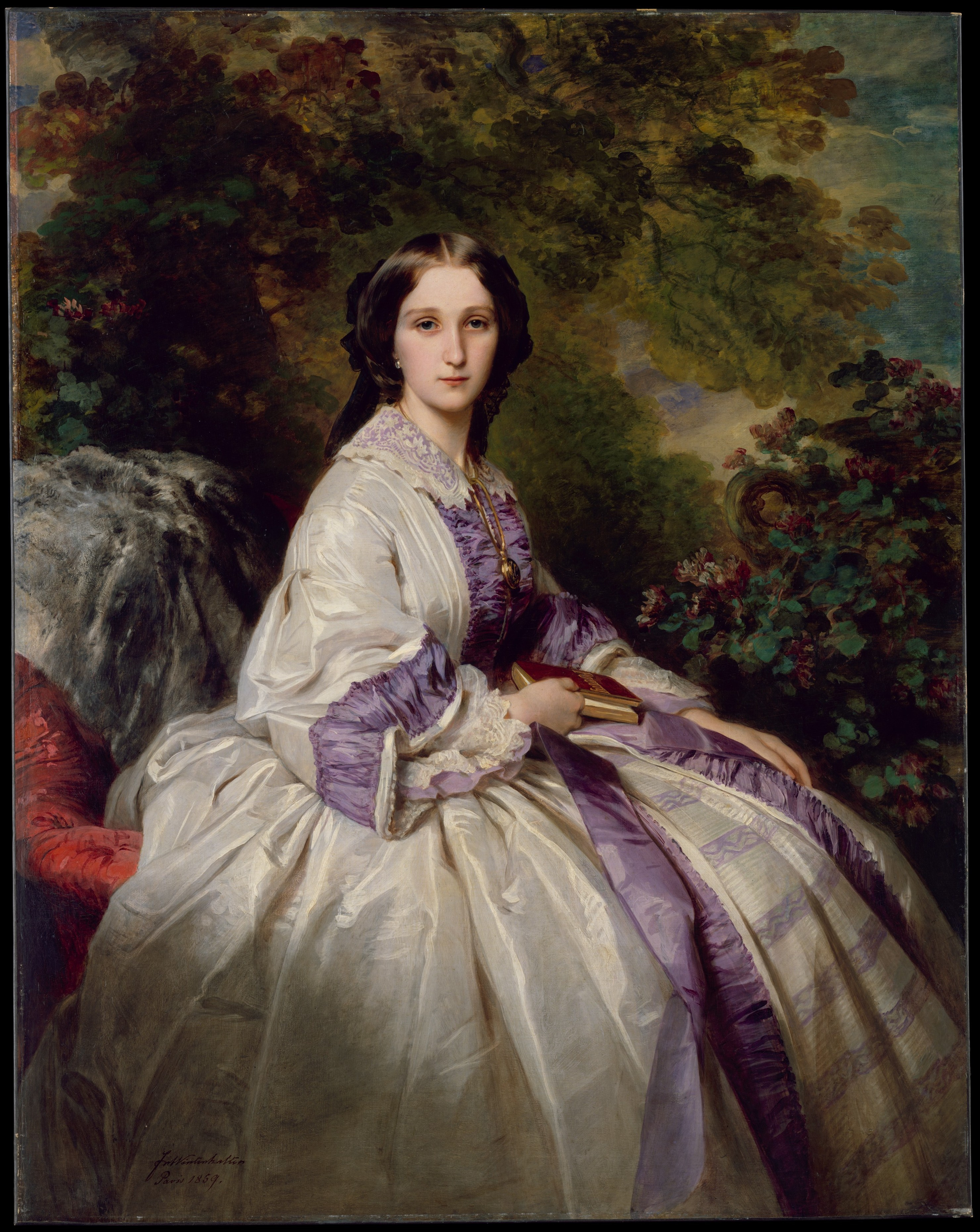
9 – 1859

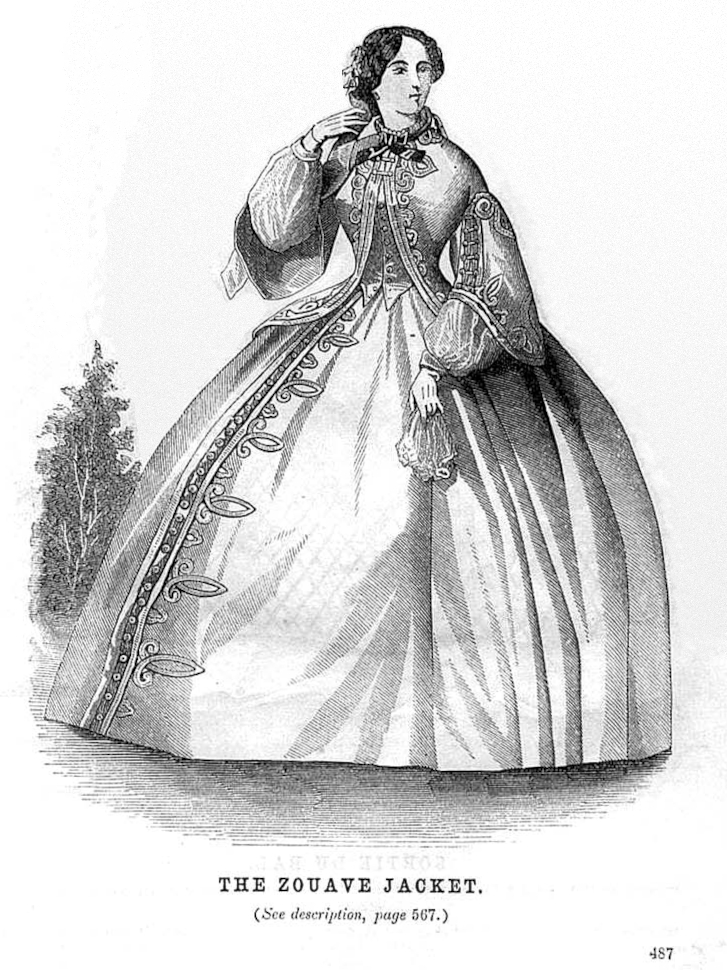
10 – 1859

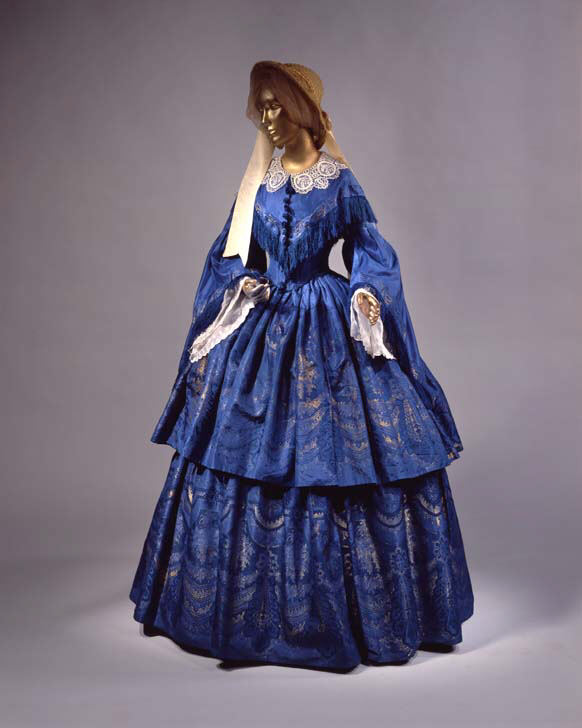
11 – 1859
1. A white muslin dress with tiered flounces from c. 1855.
2. A plaid silk tafetta dress from c. 1855.
3. A cotton afternoon dress from c. 1855.
4. Empress Eugenie and her Ladies in Waiting wear formal dress (despite the outdoor setting). The hair styled with ringlets or curls on the sides and a small bun in back is typical. 1855.
5. Mme Moitessier wears a floral gown with ribbon streamers. Her lace cap is little more than a frill trimmed in red ribbons. (It is possibly a dinner dress, worn with a full dress cap. However, owing to the size of her cap, it is more likely an irregular headdress.) 1856.
6. Charlotte Cushman wears her hair parted in the center and brushed into puffs over each ear. Her morning dress has wide pagoda sleeves and is worn over undersleeves or engageantes. The high neckline is set off with a white collar. American, 1857.
7. "Going Swimming Fully Dressed" or swimsuit of 1858 is styled like a Bloomer suit (acceptable in the context of beachwear), and includes a cap to confine the hair.
8. Fashion plate from Godey's Magazine, with full-blown little girl's crinoline.
9. Countess Alexander Nikolaevitch Lamsdorff wears a morning dress with ruched violet ribbon trim and an elaborate lace collar, 1859. The violet trim and black cap may indicate the later stages of mourning.
10. Jacket from Godey's Lady's Book, December 1859. Colorful, braid-trimmed Zouave jackets based on military styles became fashionable in the late 1850s and remained so well into the 1860s.
11. Blue silk dress with pagoda sleeves, 1859.

=== Caricature gallery ===
The crinoline style gave wide scope to satirists, and many cartoons and comic odes to the crinoline appeared.

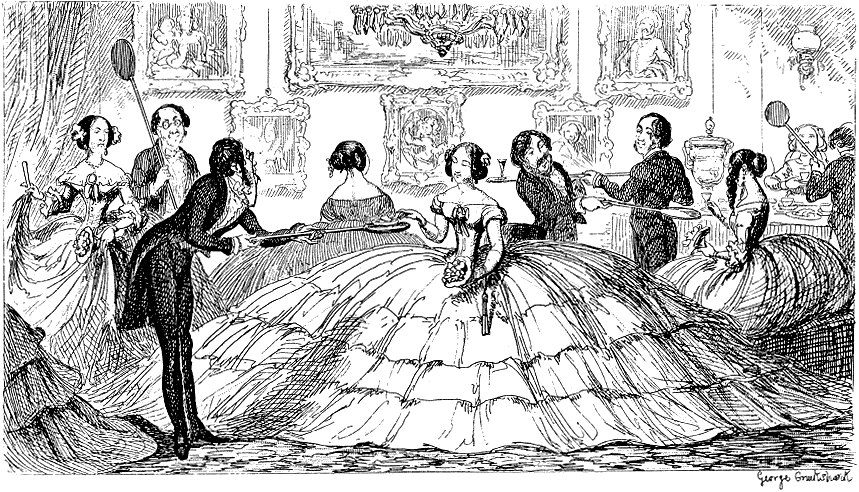
1 – 1850

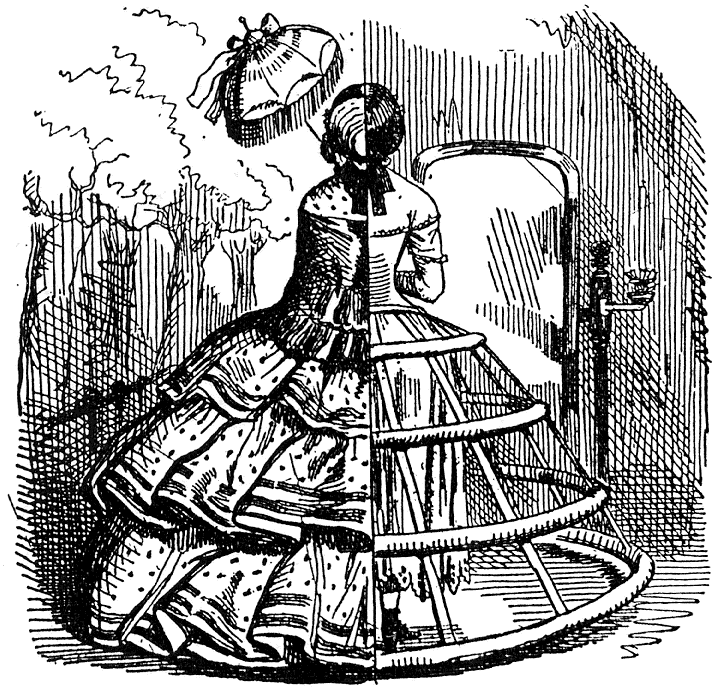
2 – 1856

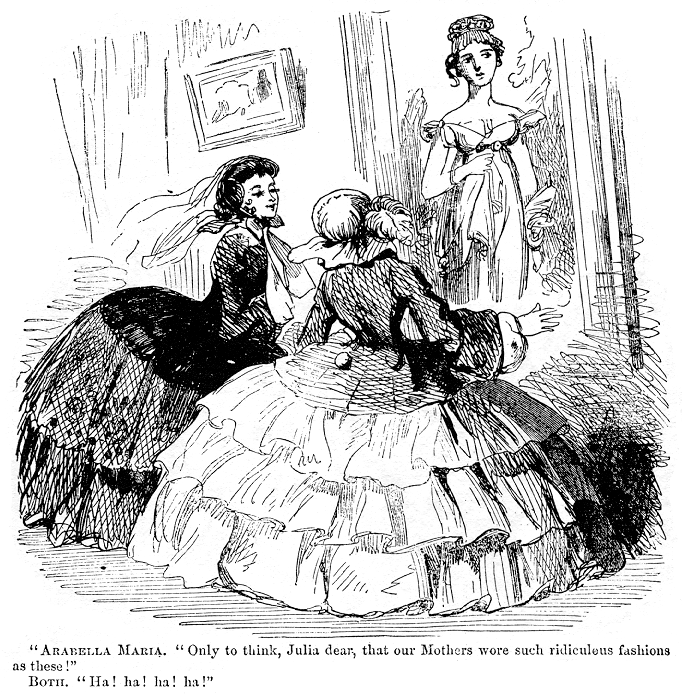
3 – 1857

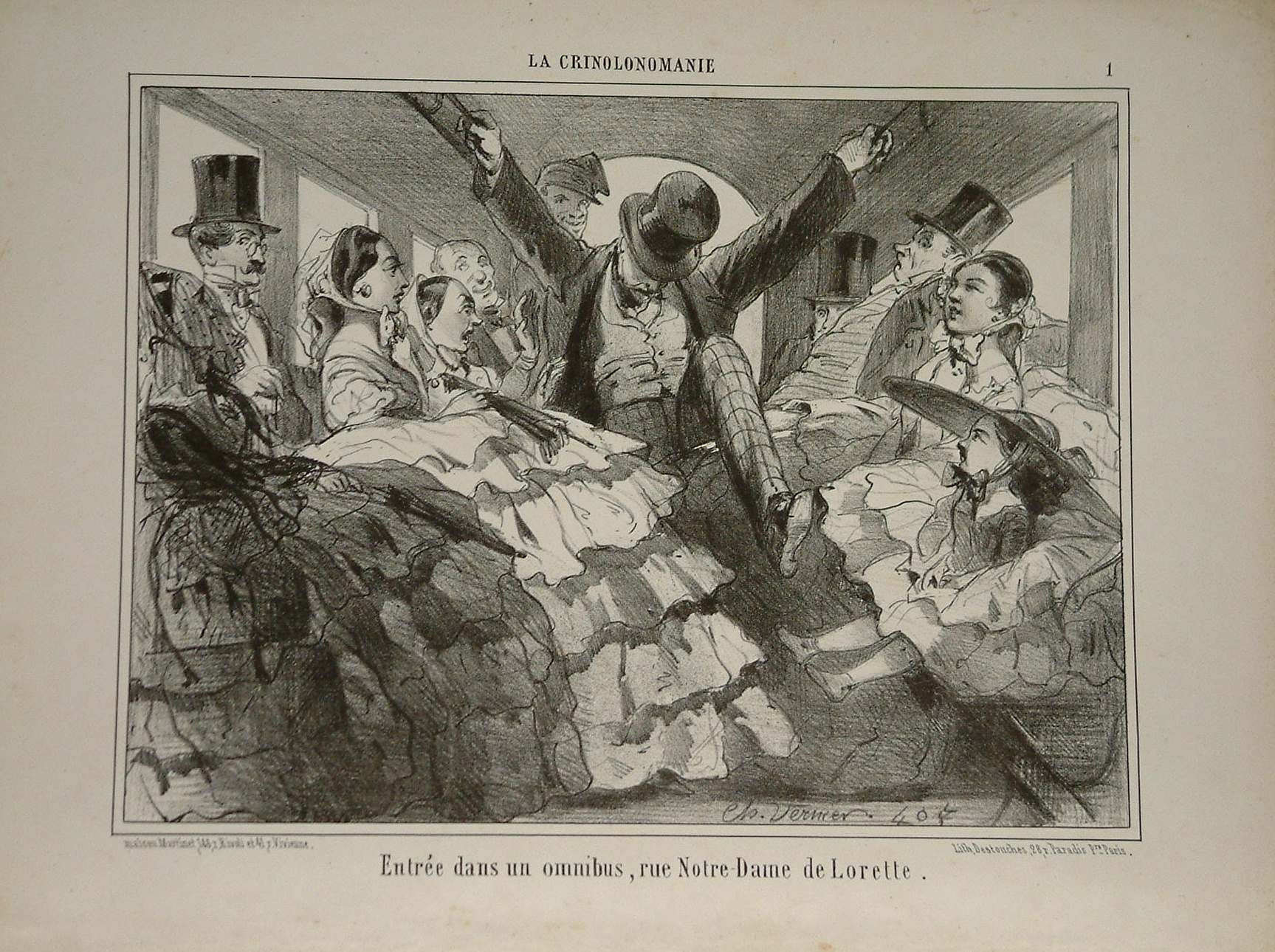
4 – 1850s
1. "A Splendid Spread", satire on an early inflatable (air tube) version of the crinoline by George Cruikshank, from The Comic Almanack, 1850. (Crinolines did not actually come into wide use until about 1854.)
2. Cutaway view of a flounced skirt over a crinoline, Punch magazine, August 1856.
3. A satirical cartoon from the July 11th 1857 issue of Harper's Weekly, contrasting the styles of the time with the Grecian-influenced Empire/Regency styles of an earlier generation.
4. Crinoline fashion cases problems in an omnibus.

== Men's fashion ==
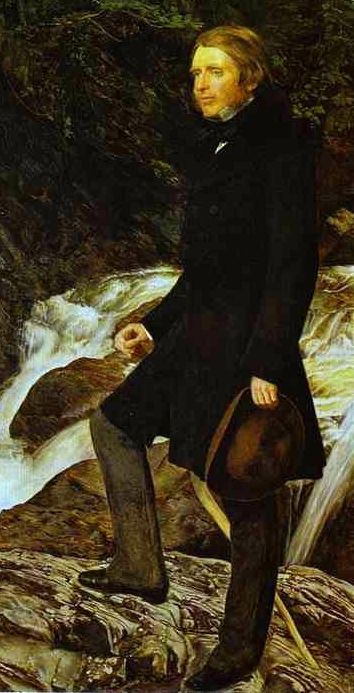
John Ruskin wears a dark frock coat over lighter trousers and low-heeled shoes. He carries a soft-crowned brown hat. Detail of a portrait by John Everett Millais, 1853–54.

Shirts of linen or cotton featured high upstanding or turnover collars. The trend of detachable shirt collars and cuffs (although first appearing in men's fashion in the 1820s) became highly popularized during this time period. The newly fashionable four-in-hand neckties were square or rectangular, folded into a narrow strip and tied in a bow, or folded on the diagonal and tied in a knot with the pointed ends sticking out to form "wings". Heavy padded and fitted frock coats (in French redingotes), now usually single-breasted, were worn for business occasions, over waistcoats or vests with lapels and notched collars. Waistcoats were still cut straight across at the waist in front in 1850, but gradually became longer; the fashion for wearing the bottom button undone for ease when sitting lead to the pointed-hemmed waistcoat later in the century.

A new style, the sack coat, loosely fitted and reaching to mid-thigh, was fashionable for leisure activities; it would gradually replace the frock coat over the next forty years and become the modern suit coat.

The slightly cutaway morning coat was worn for formal day occasions. The most formal evening dress remained a dark tail coat and trousers, with a white cravat; this costume was well on its way to crystallizing into the modern "white tie and tails".

Full-length trousers were worn for day. Breeches remained a requirement for formal functions at the British court (as they would be throughout the century). Breeches continued to be worn for horseback riding and other country pursuits, especially in Britain, with tall fitted boots.

Costumes consisting of a coat, waistcoat and trousers of the same fabric were a novelty of this period.

Starting in the 1850s and surviving until about the early 1900s (decade), facial hair became extremely popular, featuring a vast array of styles. This is well documented in famous photography of the era.

Tall top hats were worn with formal dress and grew taller on the way to the true stovepipe shape, but a variety of other hat shapes were popular. Soft-crowned hats, some with wide brims, were worn for country pursuits. The bowler hat was invented in 1850 but remained a working-class accessory.

=== Style gallery ===
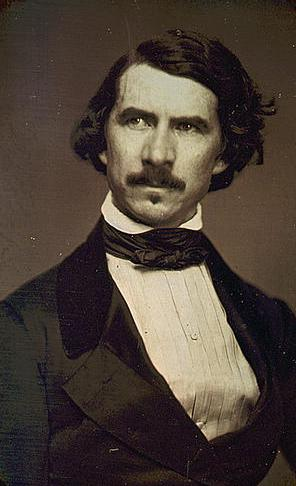
1 – c. 1850

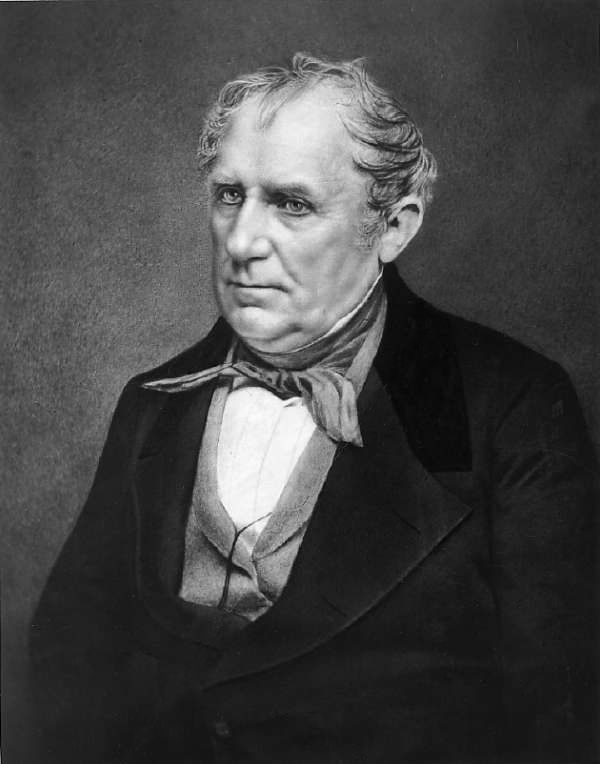
2 – c. 1850

3 – 1856

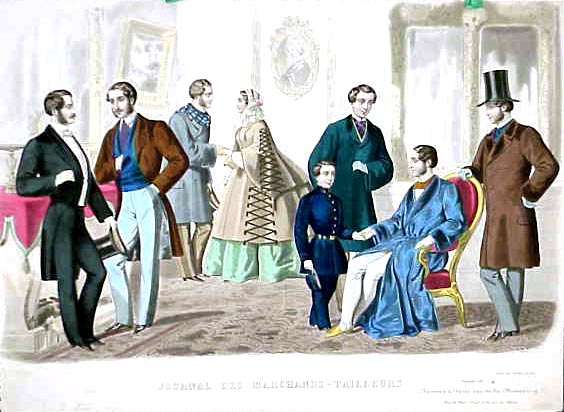
4 – 1857

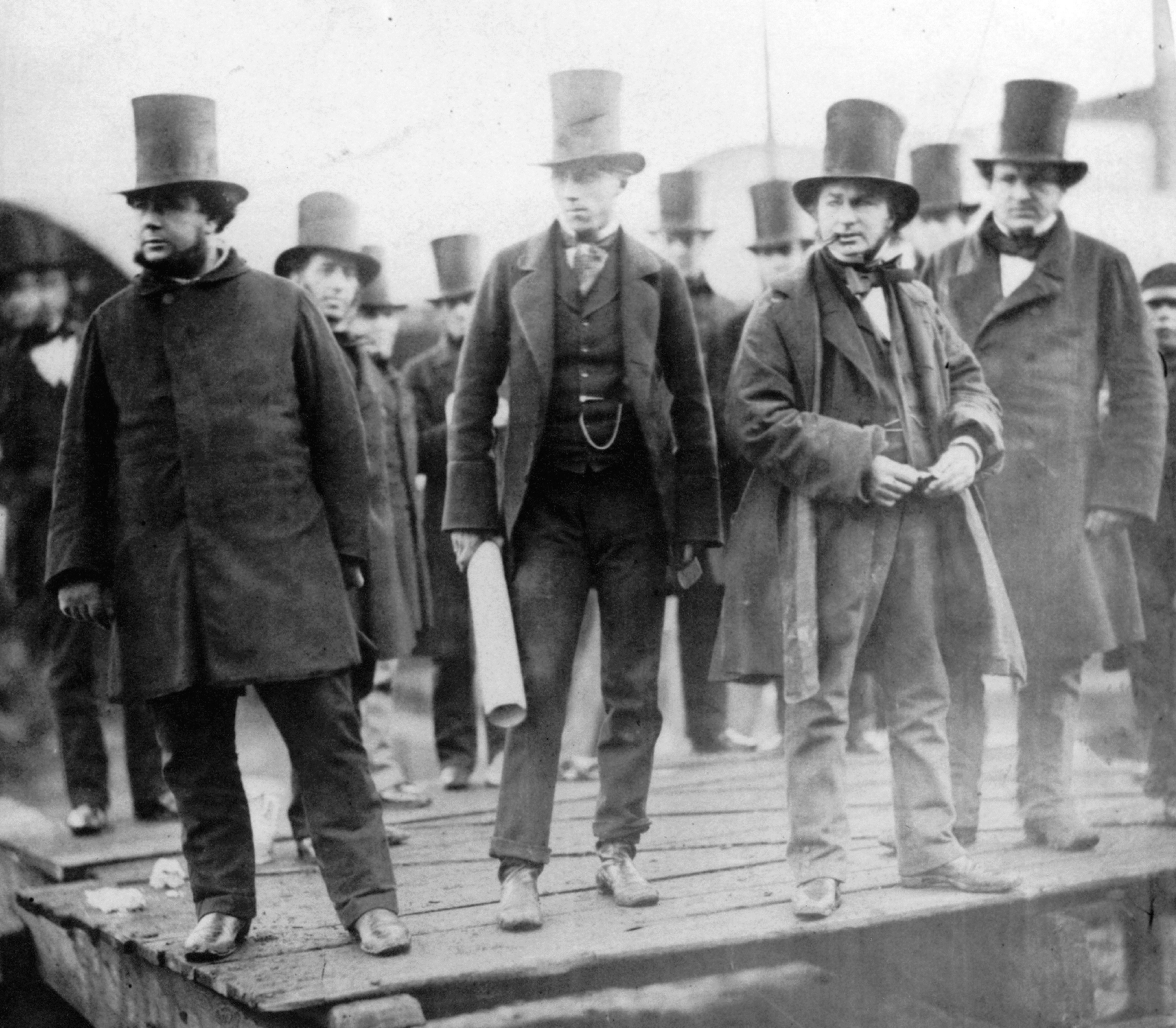
5 – 1857

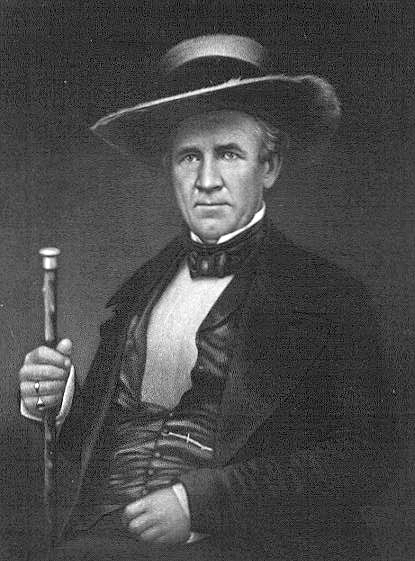
6 – 1858

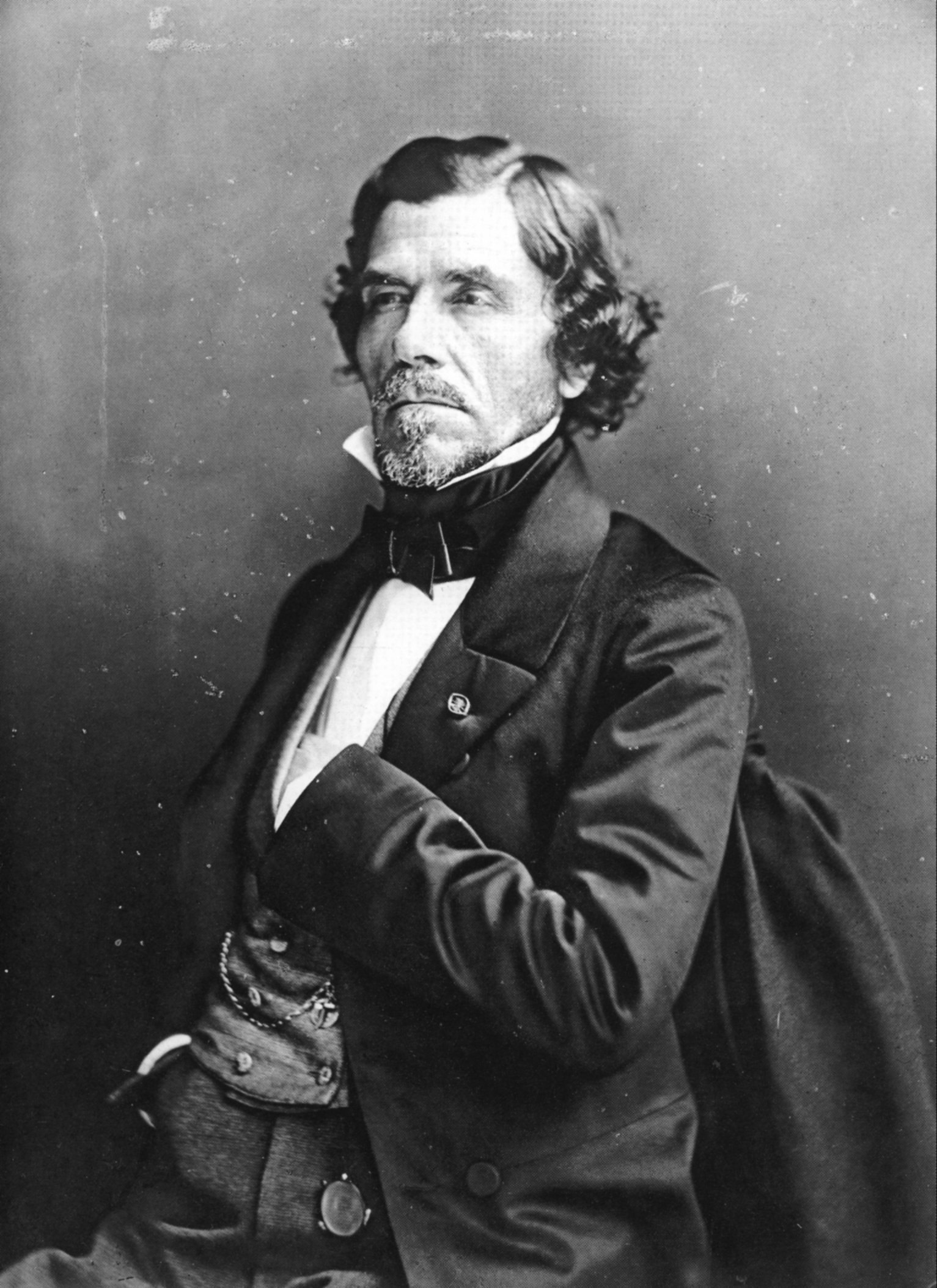
7 – 1858

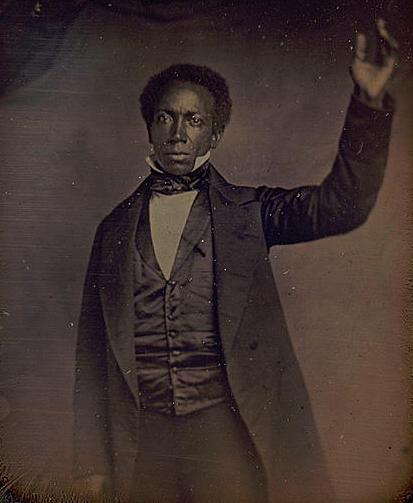
8 – 1858

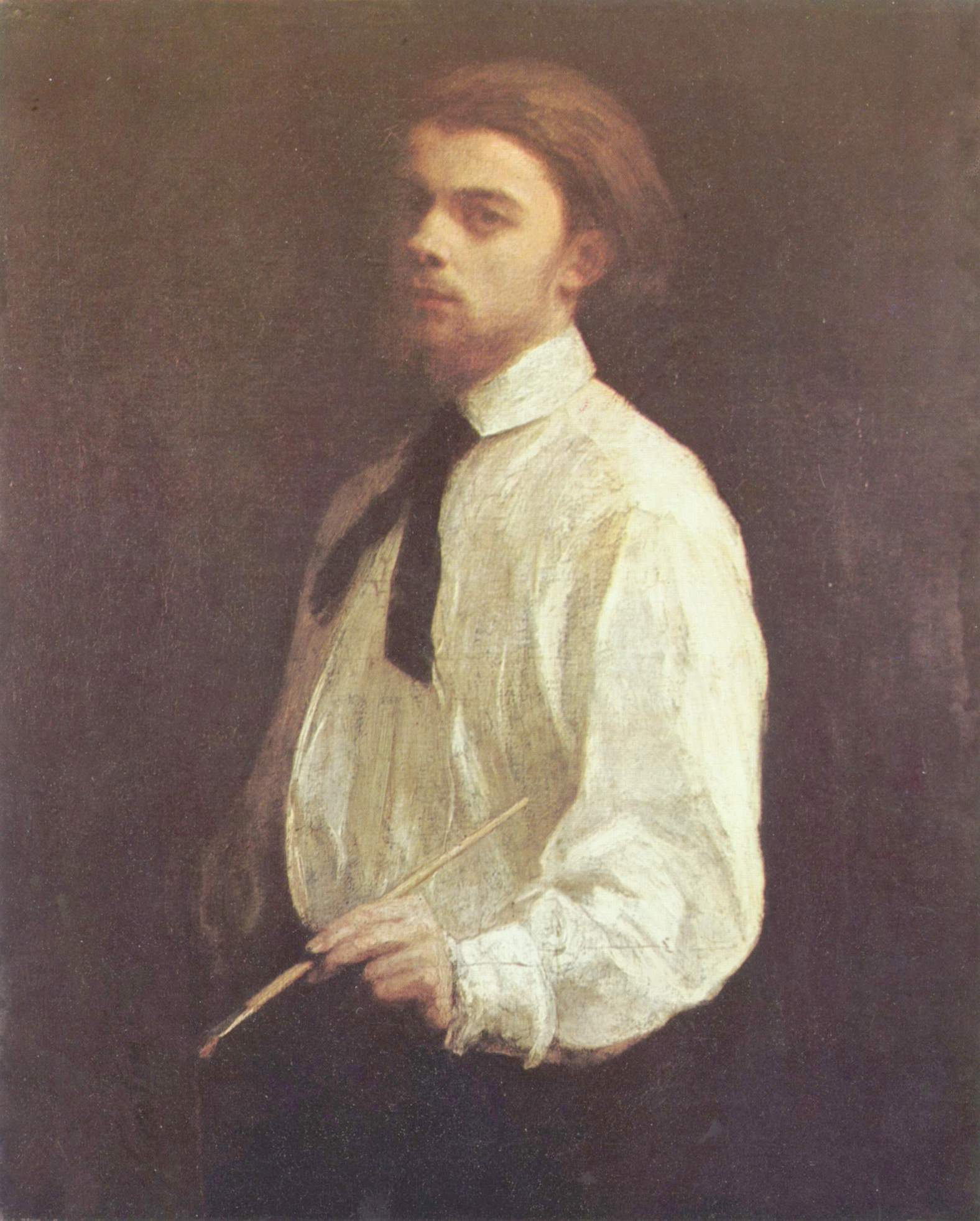
9 – 1859

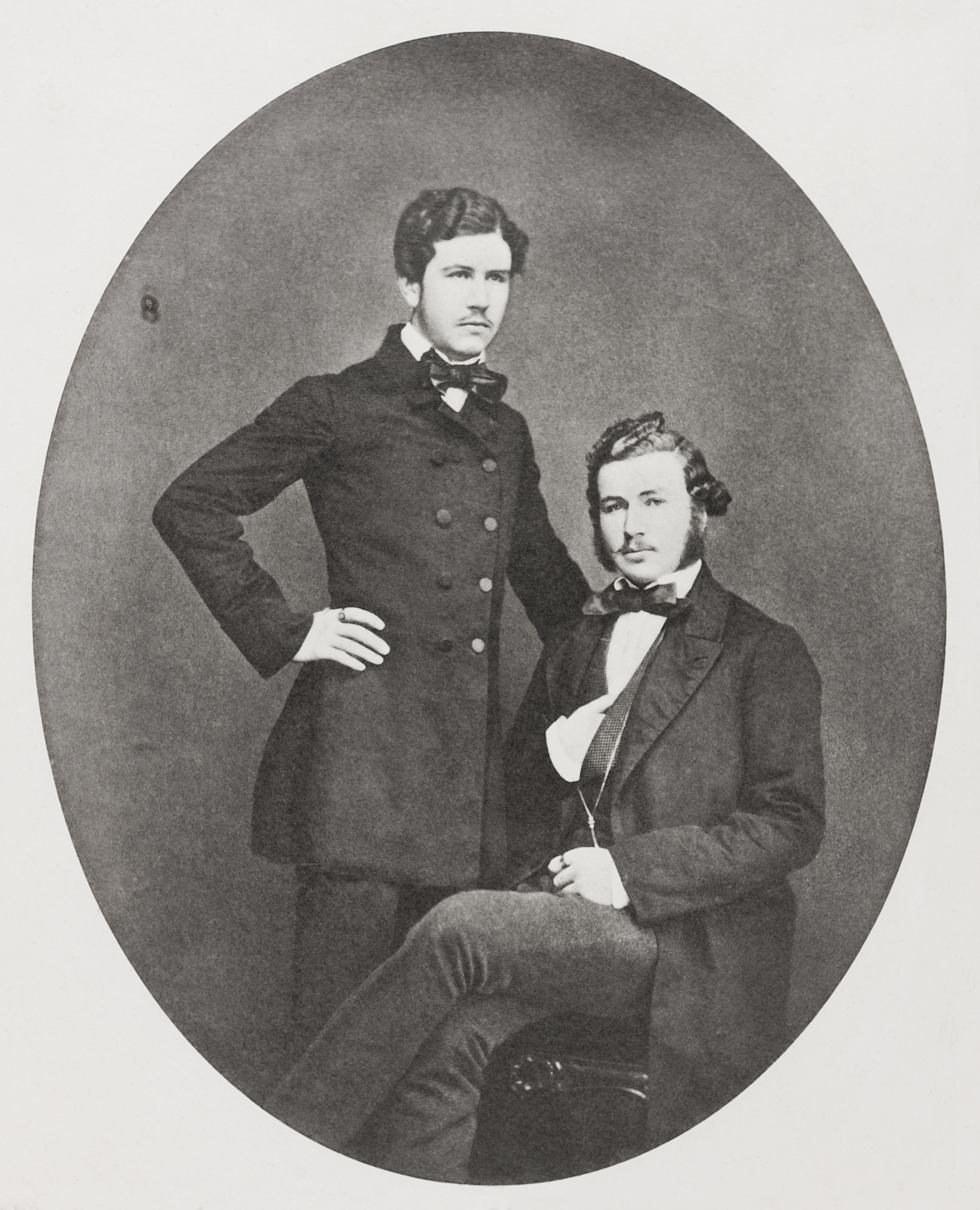
10 – 1859
1. Painter G.P.A. Healy wears a shirt with a round-cornered collar and a pleated front. His necktie is tied in a small bow. America, c. 1850.
2. James Fenimore Cooper wears a standing collar with a necktie folded on the diagonal and tied into wide "wings". His coat has wide lapels and a contrasting (perhaps velvet) collar. His contrasting waistcoat has lapels. United States, c. 1850 (Cooper died in 1851).
3. Fashions of 1856 show an idealized rounded chest over a low waist. The cutaway morning coat (left) is worn with trousers trimmed with braid down the outer seam. Shirts have short straight collars and are worn with narrow neckties tied in wide bows. Half-boots have short heels. Coat sleeves are cut long, showing very little shirt cuff.
4. 1857 fashion plate shows formal evening wear, informal day wear, top coats, and a dressing gown.
5. 1857 shows informal day wear.
6. Sam Houston, 1858, wears the wide-brimmed hat common on the American frontier.
7. Artist Eugène Delacroix wears a stiff tie over a tall standing collar. His double-breasted waistcoat is cut straight across. His frock coat, waistcoat and trousers are all of different fabrics. France, 1858.
8. Liberian politician Edward James Roye wears a frock coat with a wide collar and lapels over a waistcoat with lapels and eight buttons.
9. Artist Henri Fantin-Latour wears a shirt with a turnover collar and a black necktie.
10. Brothers Hans and Walter von Hallwyl wears redingotes, neck ties and curled hair.

=== Caricature gallery ===
Vicissitudes of the Cravat compares "The Fast Man's Neckerchief in 1809" and "The Fast Man's Neck-Tie in 1859".

== Children's fashion ==
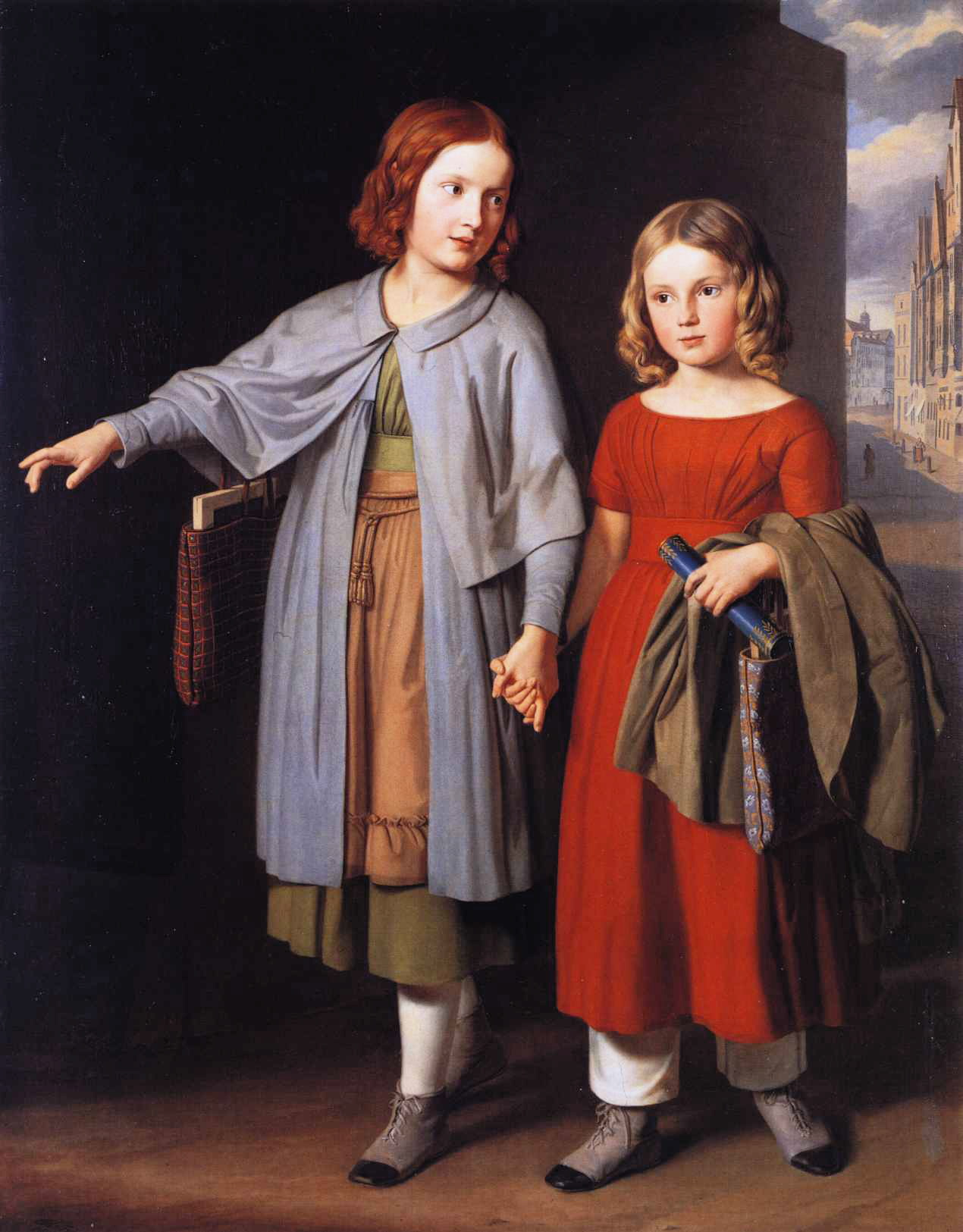
1 – 1850

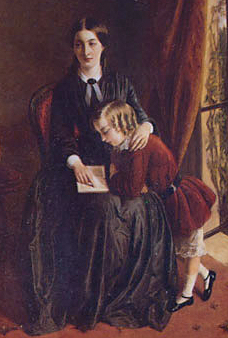
2 – 1851

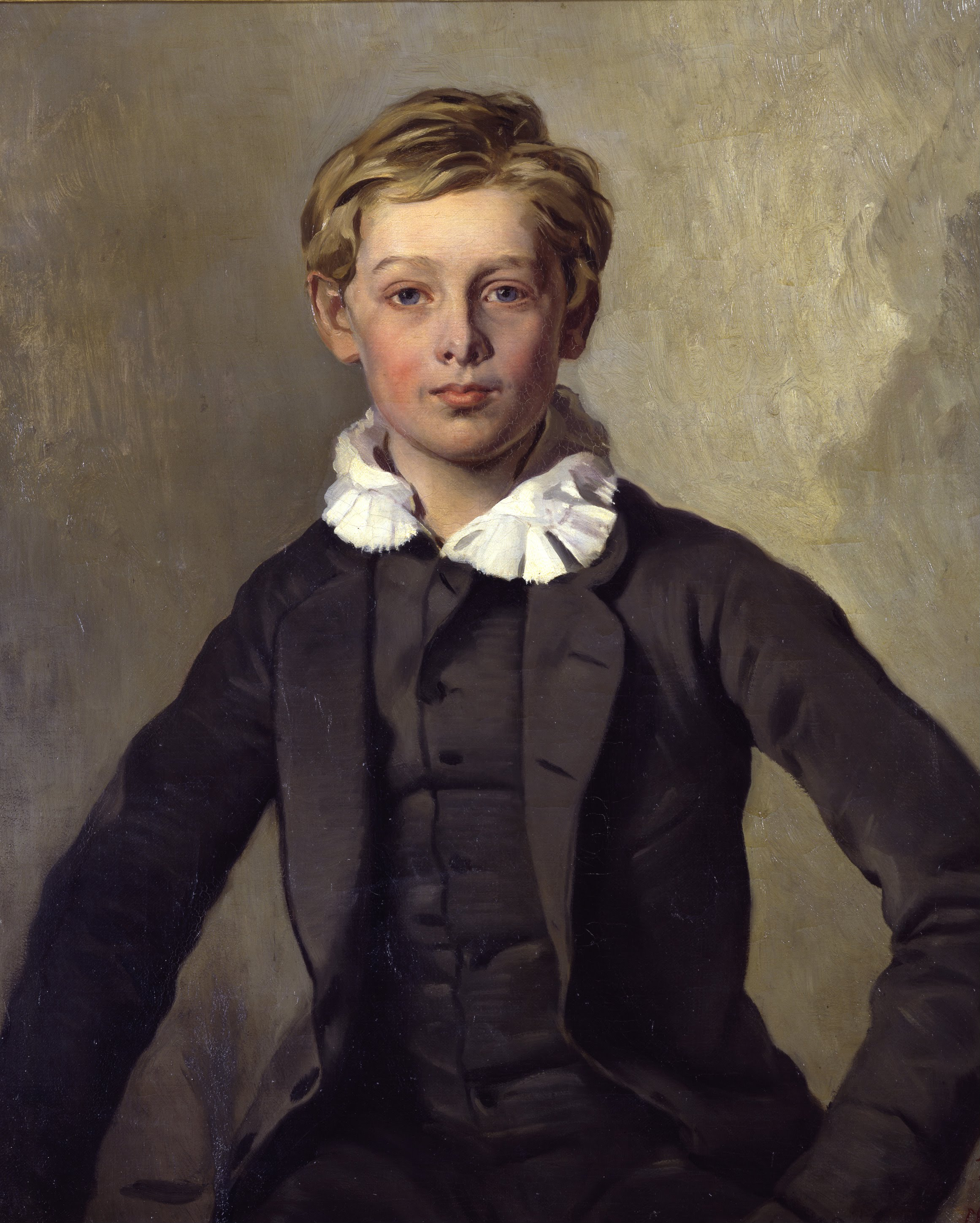
3 – 1858–59

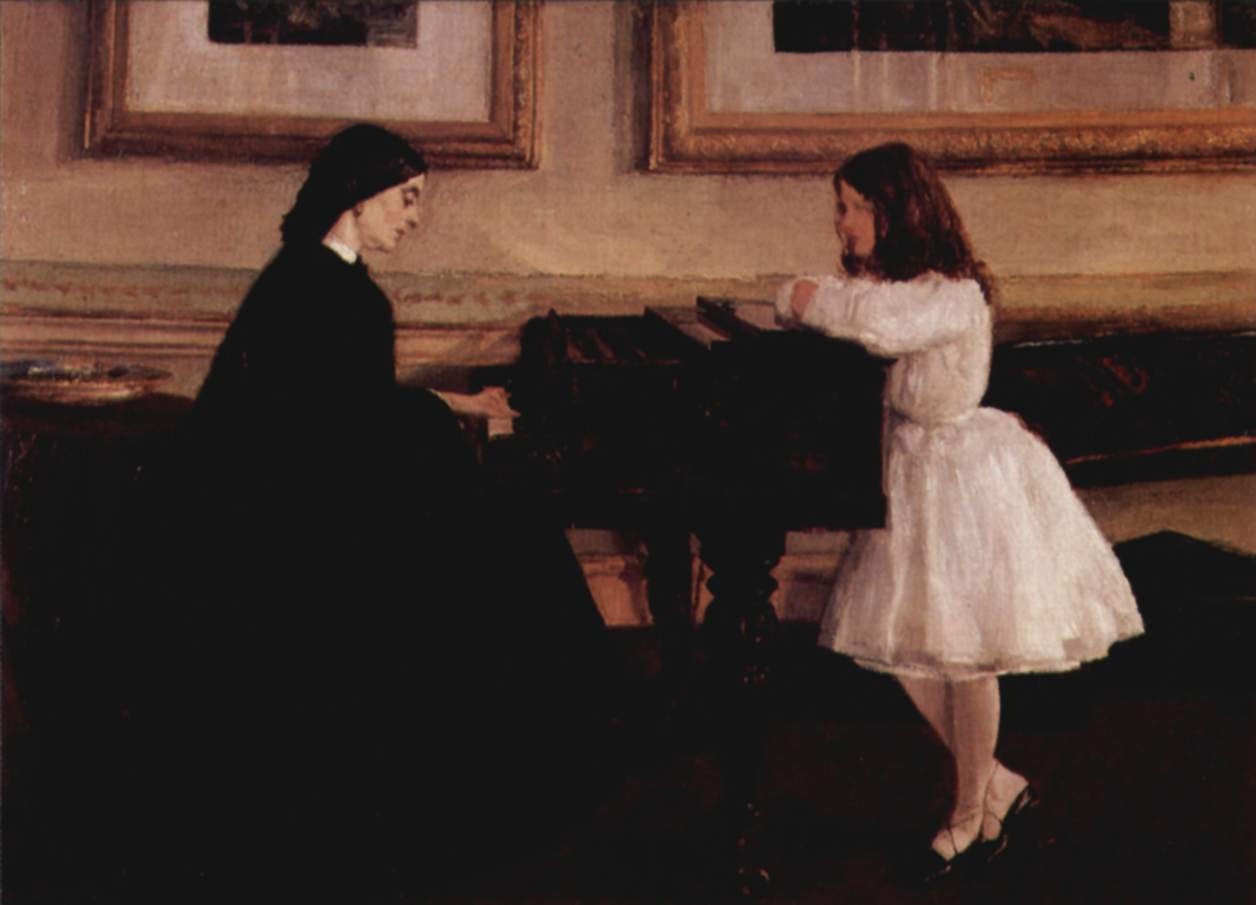
4 - 1858-59

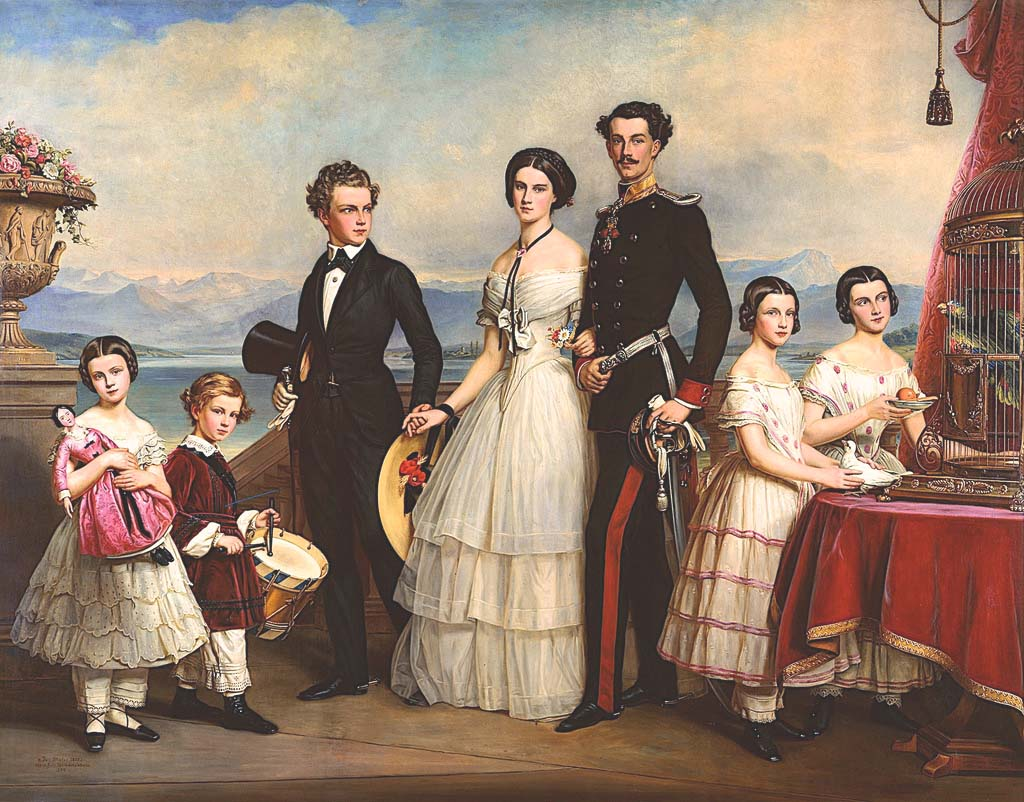
5 - 1855

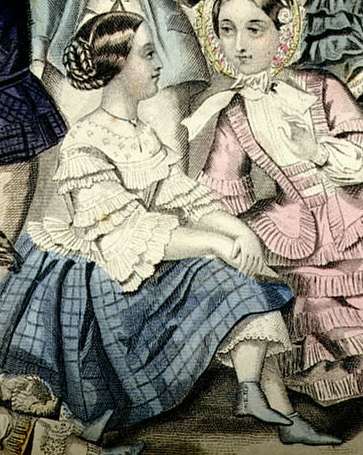
6– 1855

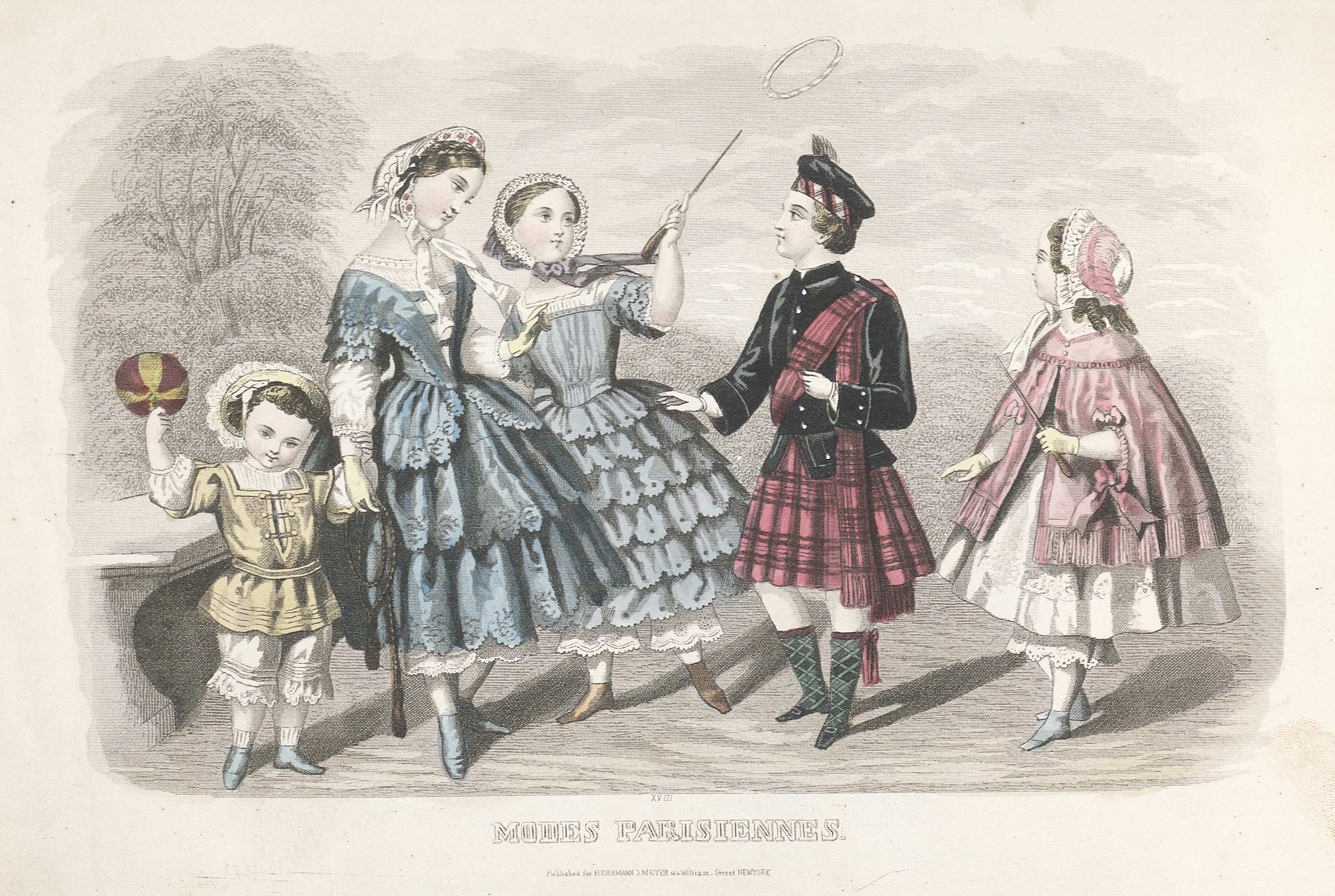
7– 1855

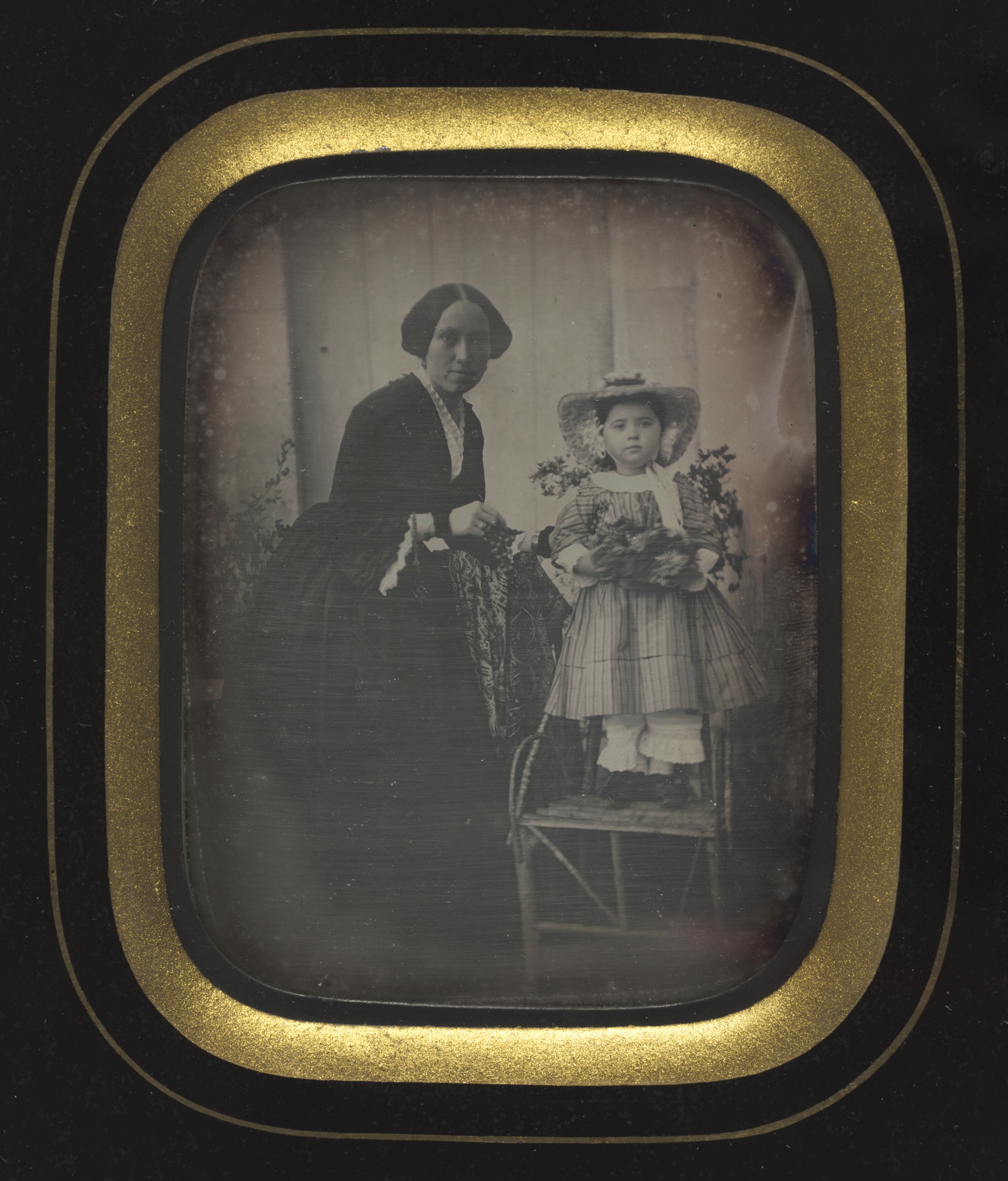
8– ca 1855

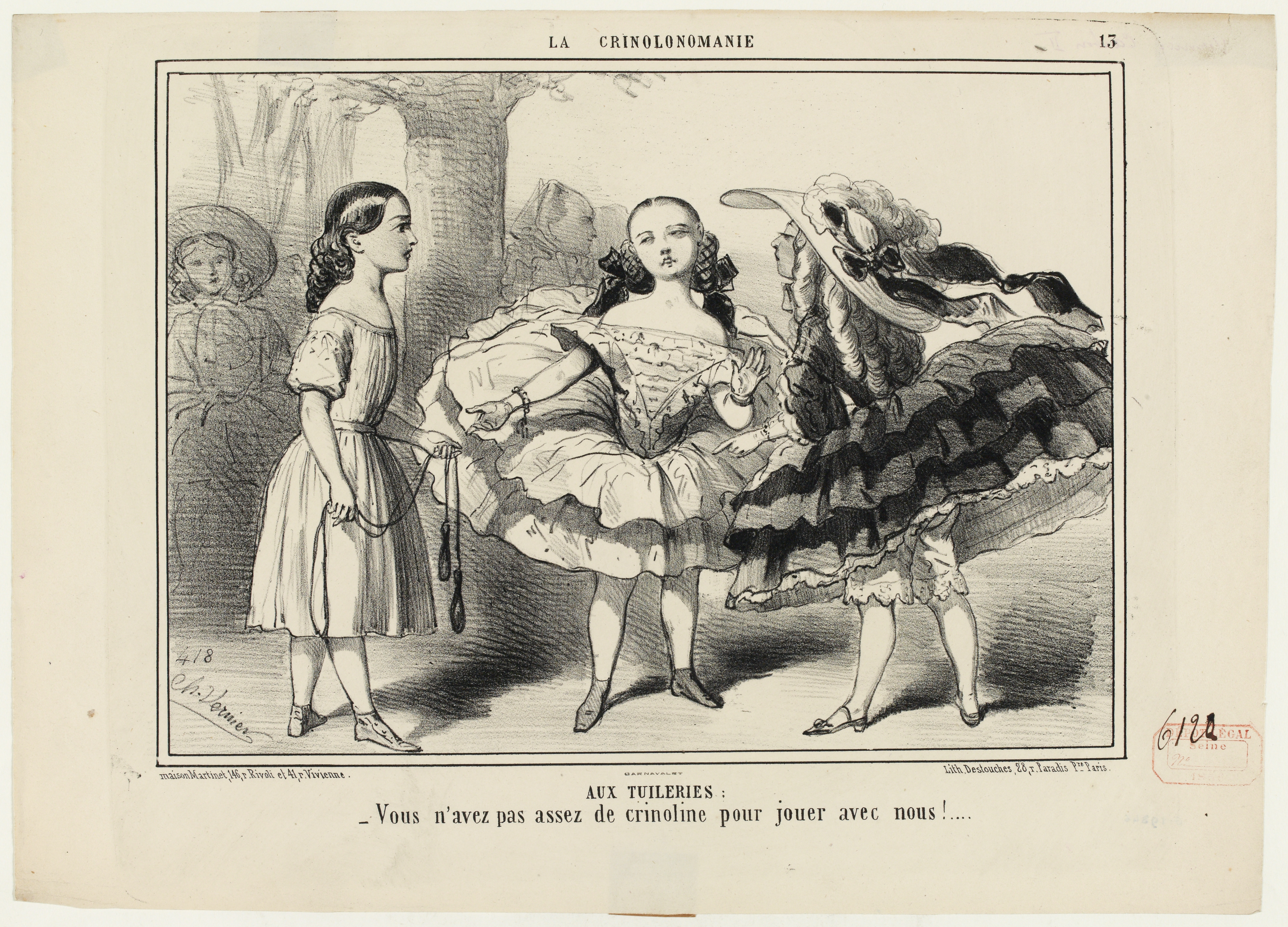
9– 1856-57

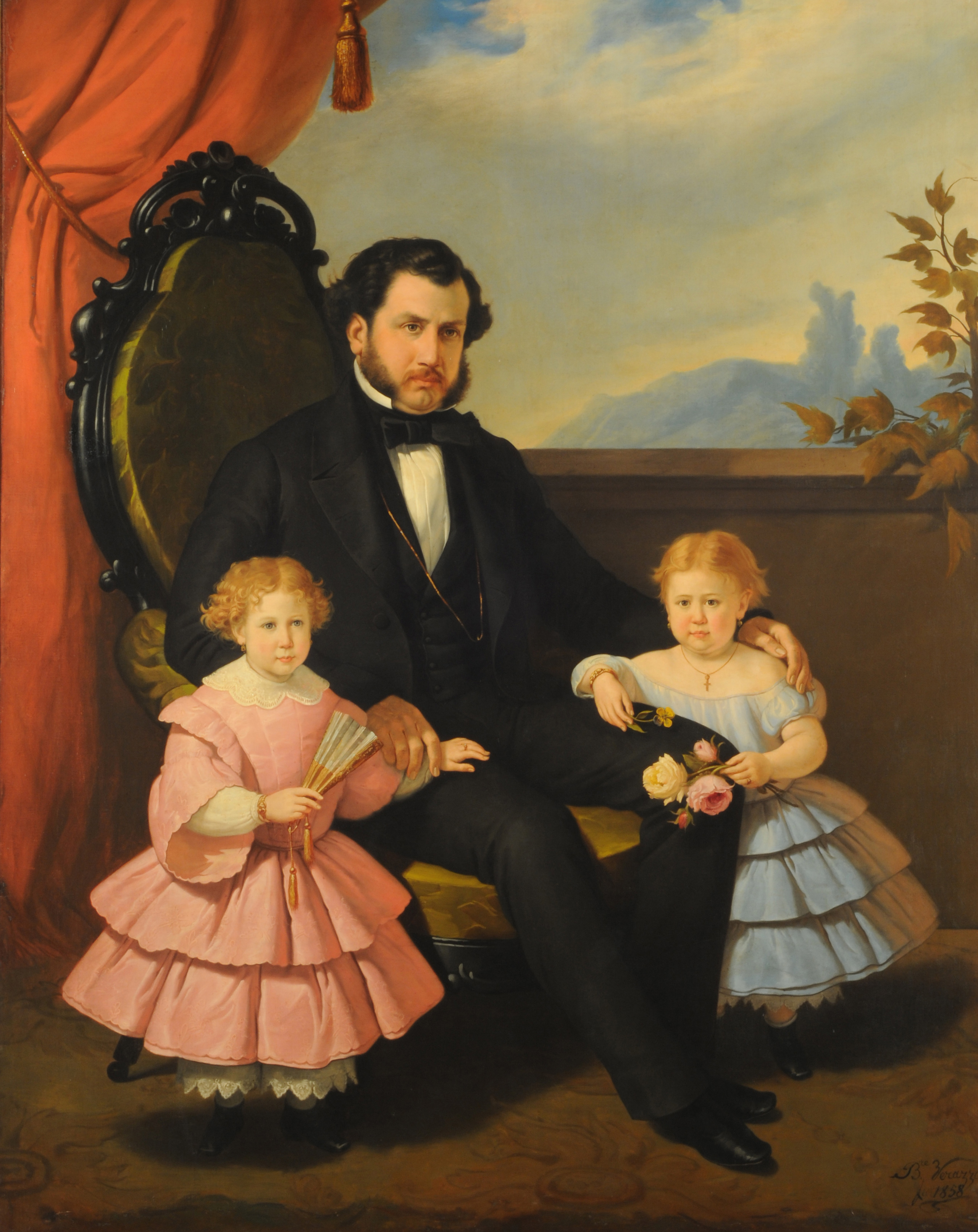
10– 1858
1. Two girls with belted dresses and cloaks. The youngest girl wears pantalettes, 1850
2. This young boy wears a belted tunic over pantalettes. His governess wears the modest, dark dress appropriate to her occupation.
3. Hans Haubold, Graf von Einsiedel wears a three-piece suit with rounded collar and lapel peaks, and the round, frilled open collar favored for children, 1855.
4. Young girl wears a knee-length skirt with crinoline petticoat, 1858–59.
5. The young siblings of Empress Elisabeth of Austria wears knee-length and ankle length skirts and a tunic suit over pantalettes, the teenagers wear adult fashion, 1855.
6. A girl in a dress and pantalettes, 1855
7. Girls in crinoline dresses and pantalettes, the boy wears a scottish suite, 1855
8. A girl in a dress, hat and pantalettes, ca 1855
9. Satirical drawing contrasting a poor girl with wealthy girls. "You don't have enough crinoline to play with us!", ca 1856-57
10. Family portrait, 1858

== See also ==
- Victorian fashion
- Corset controversy
- Crinoline
- Artistic Dress movement
- Victorian dress reform
- National Dress Reform Association
