= Victorian fashion =

Fashions and trends in British culture during the Victorian era

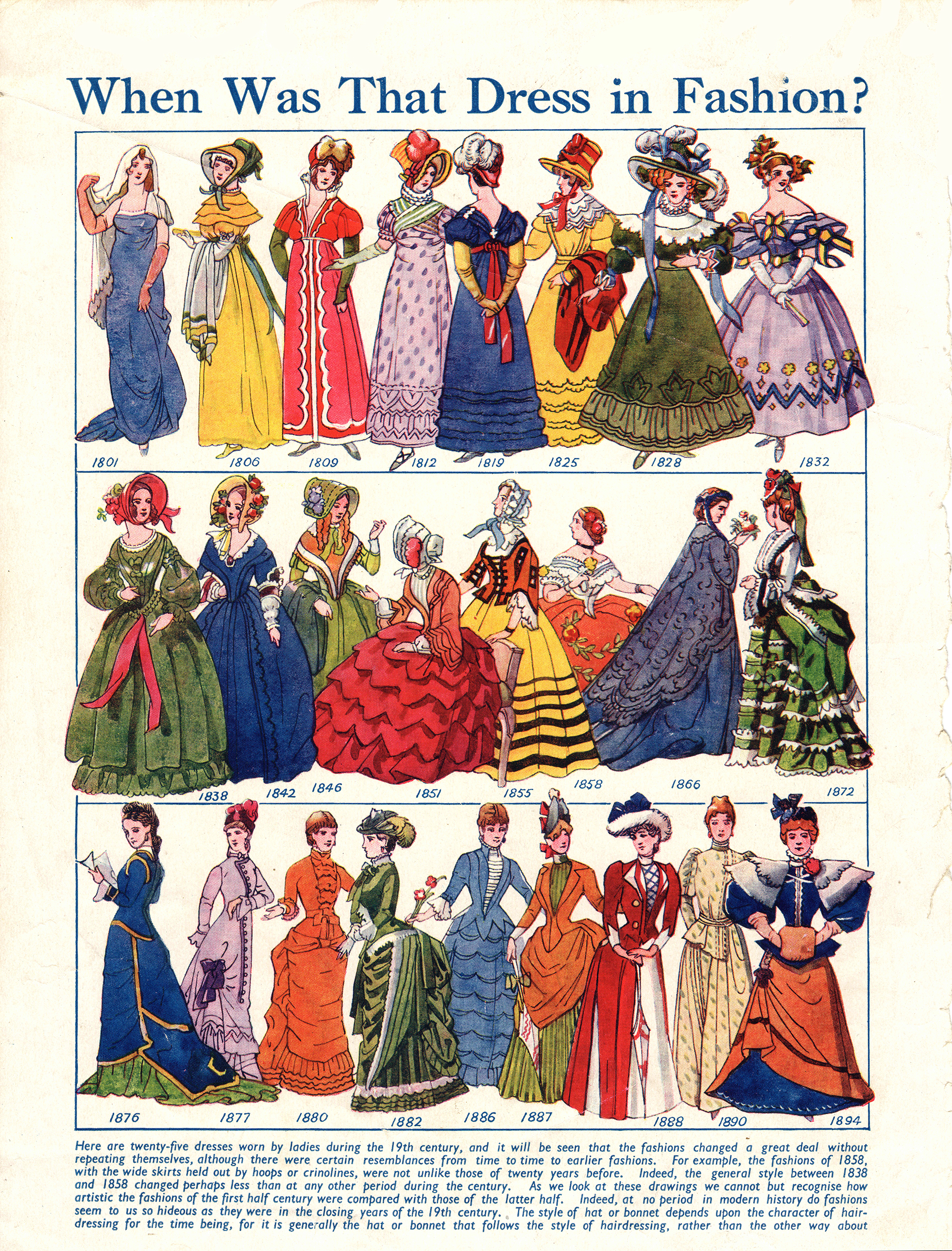
Print depicting 19th-century fashions

Victorian fashion consists of the various fashions and trends in clothing in British culture that emerged and developed in the United Kingdom and the British Empire throughout the Victorian era, roughly from the 1830s through 1900. The period saw many changes in fashion, including changes in styles, fashion technology and methods of distribution. Various movements in architecture, literature, and the decorative and visual arts as well as a changing perception of gender roles also influenced fashion.

During Queen Victoria's reign, the U.K. enjoyed a period of economic and political growth along with technological advancement. The large cultural and technological forces that supported that growth had equally sweeping influences on fashion for women, men and children. For fashion, these forces are the Industrial Revolution, the French Revolution, the British Empire (on which the sun was said never to set), the social classes (and the expanding middle class), differentiation of the genders and technological advancements.

Mass production of fabrics and threads for factory-made clothing, industrial sewing machines and the invention of synthetic dyes made clothing that was mass-produced. This mass production also made the materials for clothing constructed at home and by professional dressmakers and tailors, who in turn hired piece workers. Individually constructed (bespoke) clothing made by professional dressmakers and tailors was generally made for the upper classes until home sewing machines were introduced in the 1850s, making designed couture more available to the middle classes. Clothing could be made more quickly and cheaply. Increasingly, over the 19th century, fashion changed more frequently, with more fundamental differences than it had in prior centuries. (The print, right, shows a remarkable diversity of styles for one century of dresses.) The styles of Elizabethan England, in contrast, changed much less extremely over the course of its century.

Advancement in literacy and printing and the proliferation of fashion magazines opened the evolving trends of high fashion and the markets of advertising and mass consumption to the middle and working classes. By 1905, clothing was increasingly factory made and often sold in large, fixed-price department stores, spurring an age of consumerism with the rising middle classes.

The genders differentiated during the Victorian Era in ways that affected clothing and fashion. Middle-class women were increasingly relegated to the private, domestic "sphere" over the course of the century, and men's world was the public one. That is, the "'ideology of separate spheres' (or 'domestic ideology') ... dictated that respectable middle-class women were domestic creatures." Respectability was highly valued for middle-class women, distinguishing them from women of their class or of lower classes whose "virtue" was not apparently perfect. The personification of this domestic ideal was "the angel in the house" (from Coventry Patmore's arguably prescriptive poem).

Many upper-class married women were not concerned about respectability in the same way, although discretion was expected for those who had, for example, affairs outside of their marriages. The boundary between the working class and the middle class was porous for upper-working-class women, especially those with more education, which means that the "ideology of separate spheres" affected them and made the middle-class value of respectability important for them as well.

Men's fashions also show the effect of the domestic ideology, with their increasing uniformity over the century. According to Carolyn Kirby, a shift in men's fashions occurred abruptly at the end of the 18th century, with the French Revolution:

This sudden and profound shift in the style of men’s clothes was coined ‘The Great Male Renunciation’ by psychologist John Flugel in 1930. He argued that at the end of the 18th century, men gave up any claim to be considered beautiful and became instead "only useful."

Flugel's theory is no longer accepted uncritically, but his observation that men seemed to renounce highly decorated and ornate style is sound. Business attire in particular lost much of its color and visual diversity, and those who could afford it substituted fine fabrics and subtle design for ornamentation. Sarah Gharmallah Alzahrani and Safia Abdelaziz Saroukh see this transformation to be rooted in industrialization:

The Industrial Revolution that began in the late 18th century had a great impact on the development of fashion in the 19th century, there was a clear change in men's clothing at the beginning of the 19th century, not only in style but also in the appearance of the English sewing machine, and from this date, English clothing became world-class, and this was not only for England but for all of Europe is undoubtedly due to the French Revolution that stripped Europe of its previous leadership of fashion, so the 19th century belonged to the English in terms of [men's] fashion.

But men's clothing did have variation based on purpose. Sports (and, to the Victorians, country) clothing, for example, developed into its own genre. Peter McNeil sees the primary influences on men's fashion through the 19th to the 21st centuries to be "the cult of youth[,] ... the secularization of sport[,] the [uniforms] of modern warfare ..., [and] the tendency to prefer modern ideas of comfort and convenience." These influences have had their greatest impact in men's informal wear and made menswear generally informal.

== Women's fashions ==
The clothing choices women made were affected by social class and the prevailing ideologies and values of their class. For example, the location of middle-class women in the domestic sphere influenced their sense of fashion and of what was appropriate to wear.

The largest social class was the working classes (about 3/4 of the population in 1760), and almost all "working-class women earned money, whether in agricultural work, factories, service, domestic industry, or the new white-collar and service jobs, and their work was an important contribution to their families’ well-being or even survival." All of this work was in public, and the women's clothing reflected the work they did, whether the uniform of a servant, the practical dress of a laborer or the accessories helping to identify what they were selling.

Restricted by the "ideology of separate spheres" as they were, middle-class women also did both paid and unpaid work outside their homes. Lower-middle-class women did (often) unpaid work in the family business, making

varied and crucial contributions to family businesses and incomes. ... In addition, [more affluent] middle-class women worked, some occasionally or sporadically, others extensively and tirelessly, in and through religious or philanthropic organizations at a wide range of valued activities."

The middle classes grew during the course of the century. At the beginning they were only about "one quarter of the population by 1850, [but] between 1851 and 1871 the number of solidly middle-class families doubled." After the middle of the century, middle-class women — much of whose work occurred in the public sphere — were likely to be making their own dresses, following perhaps the fashions of haute couture but bounded by the need to appear respectable.

The women in what David Cannadine calls "the British landed establishment," the ruling class, about 1–5% of the population, lived their lives in public unless they personally chose to be more private and domestic. Besides serving on boards and running philanthropic organizations, they were the leaders of the social world, essential for the political work not only of their own interests but those of their husbands and other male relatives. Some wore haute couture, some were very active in sports and took advantage of clothing (and foundations) designed with more freedom of movement in mind and some went their own way and developed their own style.

Regardless of class, most women wore a corset over a chemise, followed by a gown or skirt paired with a bodice, blouse, or chemisette. The shape of the skirt would be supported by layers of petticoats or, later in the period, structured foundation garments like cage crinolines or bustles. The clothing of upper-class women, who generally did not do paid labor, was often elaborately decorated with more layers and trims. Middle-class women wore less complex dress styles with less expensive fabric and trim. Working-class clothing was simpler still, with less expensive fabric, fewer layers and little trim, and sometimes it signaled the work they did. Including the undergarments, the amount of fabric in women's clothing made it much heavier and the construction made it much more restrictive than ours, especially in the waist (due to the boning in the corset) and the shoulders (due to the popularity of dropped shoulder seams). The amount, quality and type of fabric were displays of wealth and status.

Throughout the 19th century, journalism increasingly targeted women and addressed an increasingly more class-diverse audience. According to the Dictionary of Nineteenth-Century Journalism,

The closely allied fashion and women's journals can be divided into three phases: titles such as the Lady's Magazine continued eighteenth-century models, addressing readers as "ladies" and catering to a leisured, fashionable elite; a more domesticated format by the 1840s, targeting middle-class women with instructive and entertaining content including dressmaking and etiquette articles ...; finally, from the 1870s, a livelier, more engaging style of fashion reporting influenced by the New Journalism was integrated with an increased amount of imagery, including better quality fashion plates ....

For example, Ackermann’s Repository of Arts, Literature, Commerce, Manufactures, Fashions, and Politics magazine (which ran from 1809 to 1829, became a fashion-only periodical in 1829) "appealed to fashion-conscious Britons." Ackermann's was ultimately absorbed by La Belle Assemblée, or, Bell's Court and Fashionable Magazine Addressed Particularly to the Ladies (which ran until 1837), which was also influential in the U.S. By the end of the century, women's periodicals included patterns for dressmaking in their pages, reflecting the presence of middle- and working-class readers as well as technological change like sewing machines for home use and mass-produced fabrics and trim.

=== Elements of Victorian Fashion ===
It is important not to oversimplify the fashion of the Victorian age. The rate of change in fashion accelerated in the 19th century to the point that styles were distinctly different from one decade to the next (see the print called "When Was That Dress in Fashion?", top right).

The most important elements for the analysis of 19th-century fashion include silhouette or line, foundation garments like corsets or stays, the neckline and the sleeves. The silhouette in particular but also the color, the variety of available fabrics and the distribution of information and opinion about fashion were the result of technological changes made throughout the century, but centering in the 1850s.

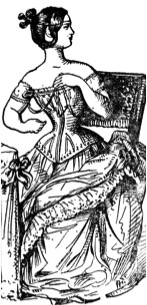
An 1837 woman lacing her own corset

Silhouette: Silhouette changed over time supported by the evolution of the foundation garments. In fact the line or silhouette of garments changed about every ten years. Just as outer clothing changed, foundation garments were also modified to give the wearer a different silhouette. Over the course of the century most Europeans (and many in the colonies) wore the same kinds of undergarments and outer garments. For example, wide skirts were supported by layers of petticoats that used woven horsehair to stiffen them. By 1856 the cage crinoline (a domed structure using steel bands and wires) replaced the petticoats, making the skirts lighter in weight and easier to walk in. The line of the outer garments was influenced by how full the skirt was, how small the waist was and its location relative to the natural waistline, how the sleeves were shaped and how deep the neckline went.

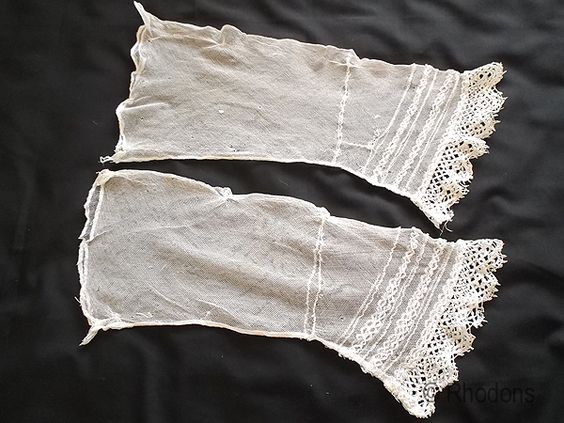
Engageants

Corsets: Corsets or stays were ubiquitous, providing adjustable bust and posture support, helping to shape the body into the fashionable silhouette and preventing horizontal creasing in the bodice. Over the course of the century, almost all women and some men wore corsets. After the late 1850s, an individual could lace a corset without help. Most corsets were constructed with a busk "(a flat length of whalebone, wood or steel) inserted in a channel down the centre to smooth out the front of the dress." The drawing of the 1837 woman (right) shows a self-laced corset with what may be a split busk.

Neckline: Necklines changed over the course of the century as bodices and sleeves evolved. The less formal daywear had a higher neckline, regardless of class and decade. For formal wear, which varied widely by class and kind of event, the neckline was often lower and off the shoulder and finished with a bertha (lace collar or flounce) or multiple bands of fabric pleats. This décolleté evening style popularized shawls or capelets and required a corset without shoulder straps. Around the middle of the century dressmakers sometimes even produced two bodices with each skirt, one closed décolletage for day and one décolleté for evening. (40)

Sleeves: Over the course of the century, styles in sleeves changed radically and more than one sleeve style was fashionable at the same time. Some of the most popular styles included gigot, pagoda, engageants (see right), bishop and leg-of-mutton sleeves. The changes were in the armscye, the wrist treatment, and the fullness at the shoulder, elbow and wrist. For example, as crinolines began to appear in the 1850s, sleeves were shaped like large bells known as pagoda sleeves. Engageantes, or false sleeves, were stitched inside full or open sleeves like pagoda sleeves and were made of light fabrics like lace, linen, lawn or cambric. They were easy to remove, launder and restitch into position.

Even though the changes in fashion over the century were sometimes rapid and extreme, they were also slow and evolutionary. The pagoda sleeve, for example, was popular for three decades, changing mostly just in the decorative trim.

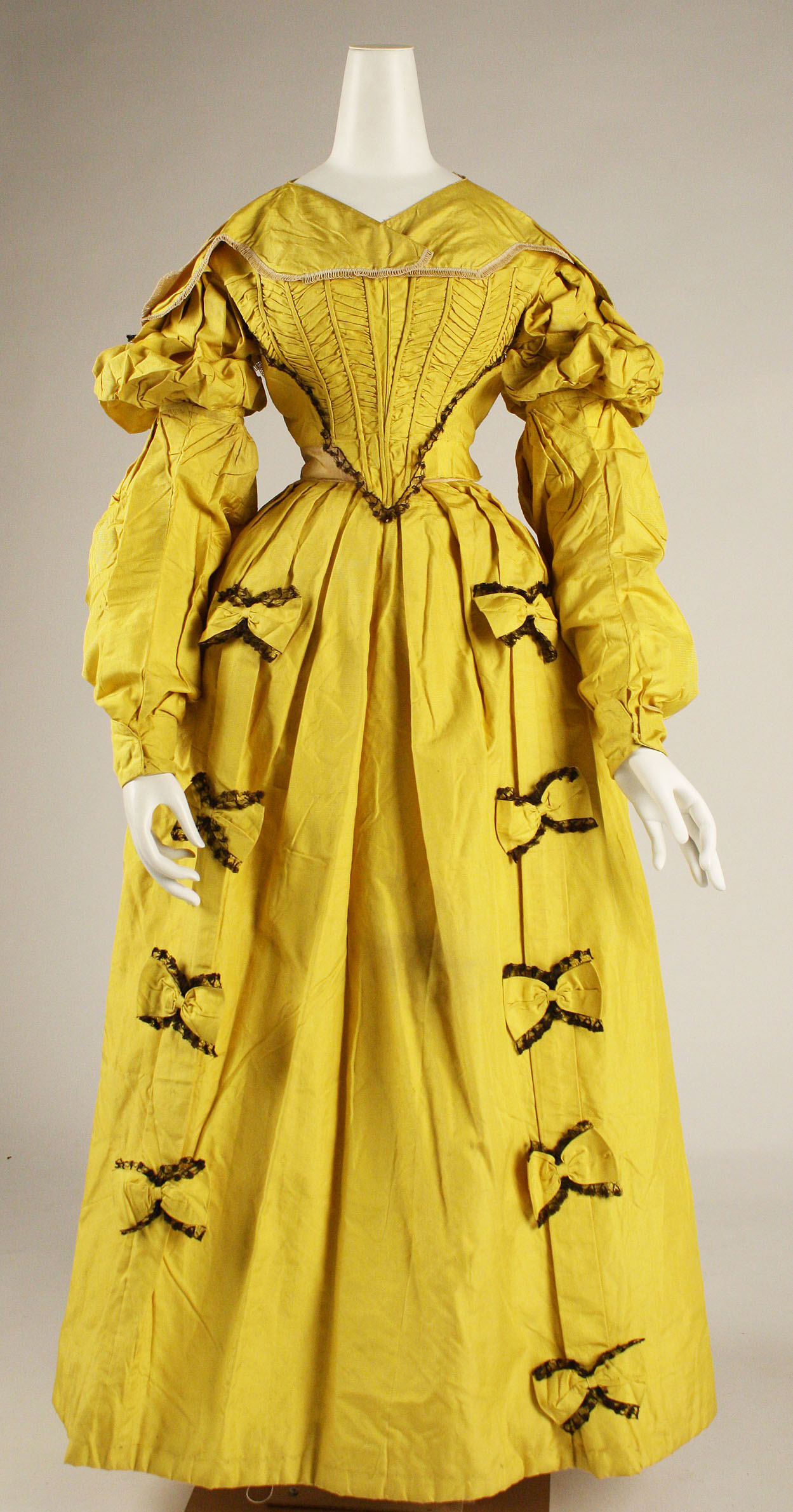
English day dress, c. 1838, with bow details and puffed sleeves

=== 1830s dress style ===
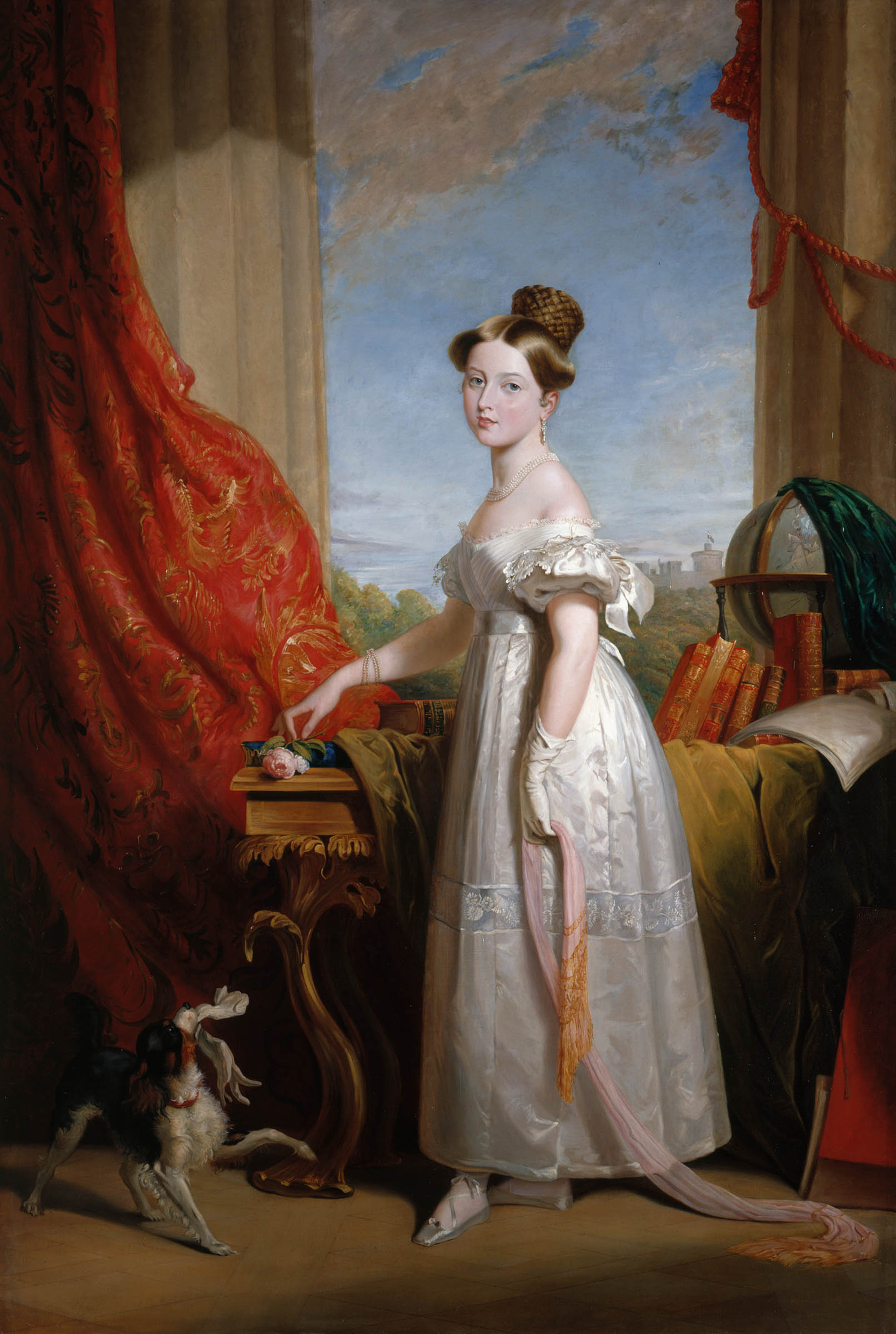
Princess Victoria and her dog Dash

During the beginning of Queen Victoria's reign in 1837, the fashionable silhouette was an hourglass shape with wide shoulders, emphasized by puffed gigot sleeves, a full skirt, and a slim waist.

Corsets were extended over the abdomen and down towards the hips, and worn with a busk. A chemise was worn under the corset, and cut relatively low in the neck so that it could not be seen. Over the corset was the tight-fitting bodice featuring a high, straight waistline. Under the ankle-length skirt were layers of petticoats stiffened with horsehair. (Skirts would not be extremely full for another two decades.) To contrast with the narrow waist, necklines were low and wide. Queen Victoria's 1833 white dress (left) shows an off-the-shoulder neckline, a high waist and an ankle-length skirt held out by petticoats. The c. 1836 yellow day dress (right) shows gigot sleeves, a high neckline and a skirt held out by petticoats.

Always a mark of wealth and status, the white dress that Princess Victoria is wearing shows that she is formally dressed, perhaps for court, although the pose itself suggests some informality as well.

=== 1840s dress style ===
The 1840s saw an increase in domestic magazines targeting women, along with new varieties in the weave of ready-made fabrics as well as new and much more vibrant colors because of the invention of aniline dyes. Cotton replaced silk as a basic fabric, especially among middle-class women, because silk was expensive, limiting who could afford it. The elements of fashion changed rapidly during this transitional decade.

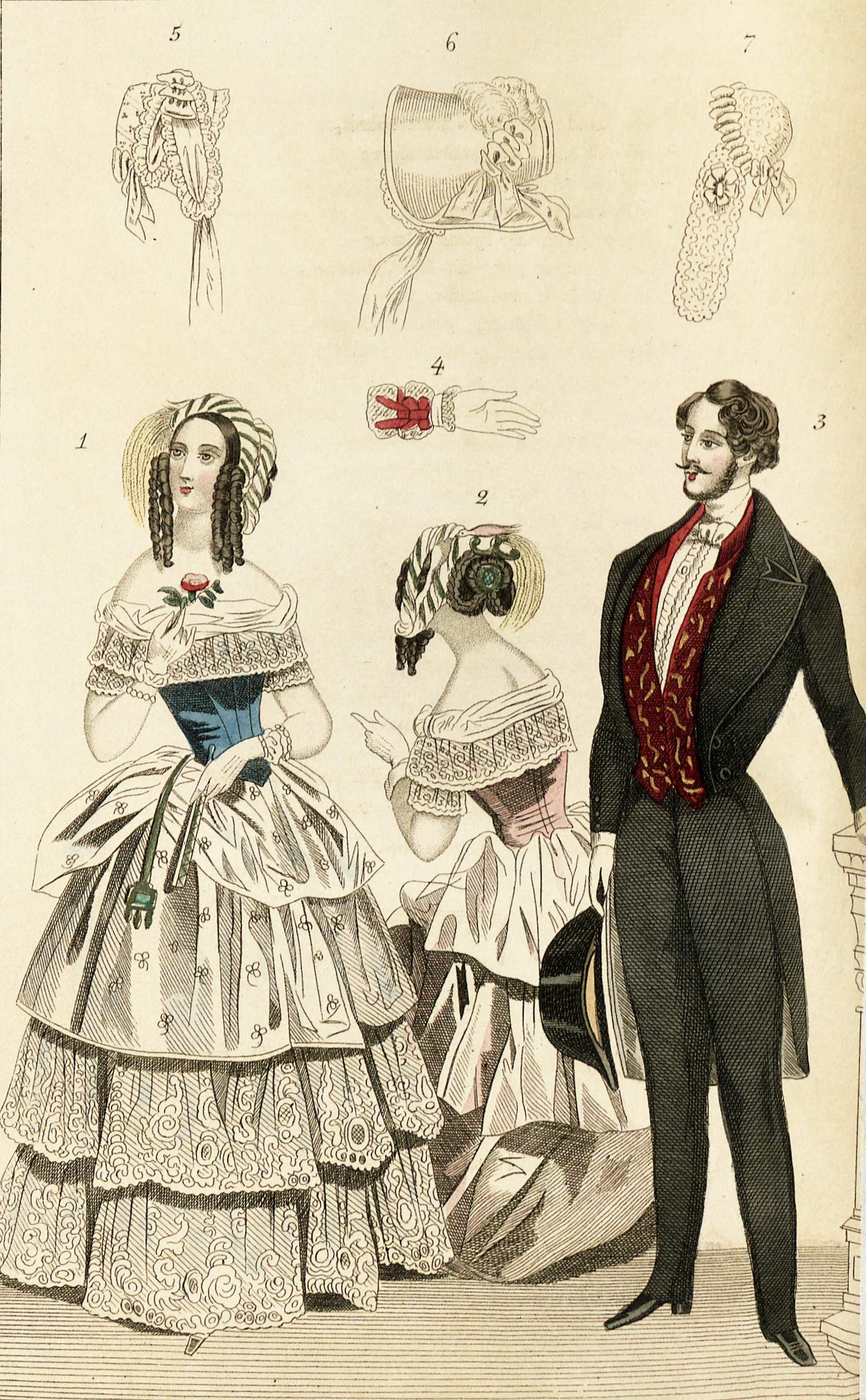
1844 fashion plate depicting fashionable clothing for men and women

At the beginning of the 1840s, skirts began to widen and become dome shaped (because the skirt pieces changed from rectangles to gores, which are wider at the bottom). The waistline lowered with a point formed at the bottom of both the bodice and corset, which gave a rather rigid look to the silhouette. During this decade, the amount of trim decreased in general, although it was still plentiful. In addition to the flowers, feathers, and ribbons many of the decorations on the dress were made of the fabric of the dress (tucks and pleats, flounces, ruffles). At the end of the decade, waists rose to the natural waistline.

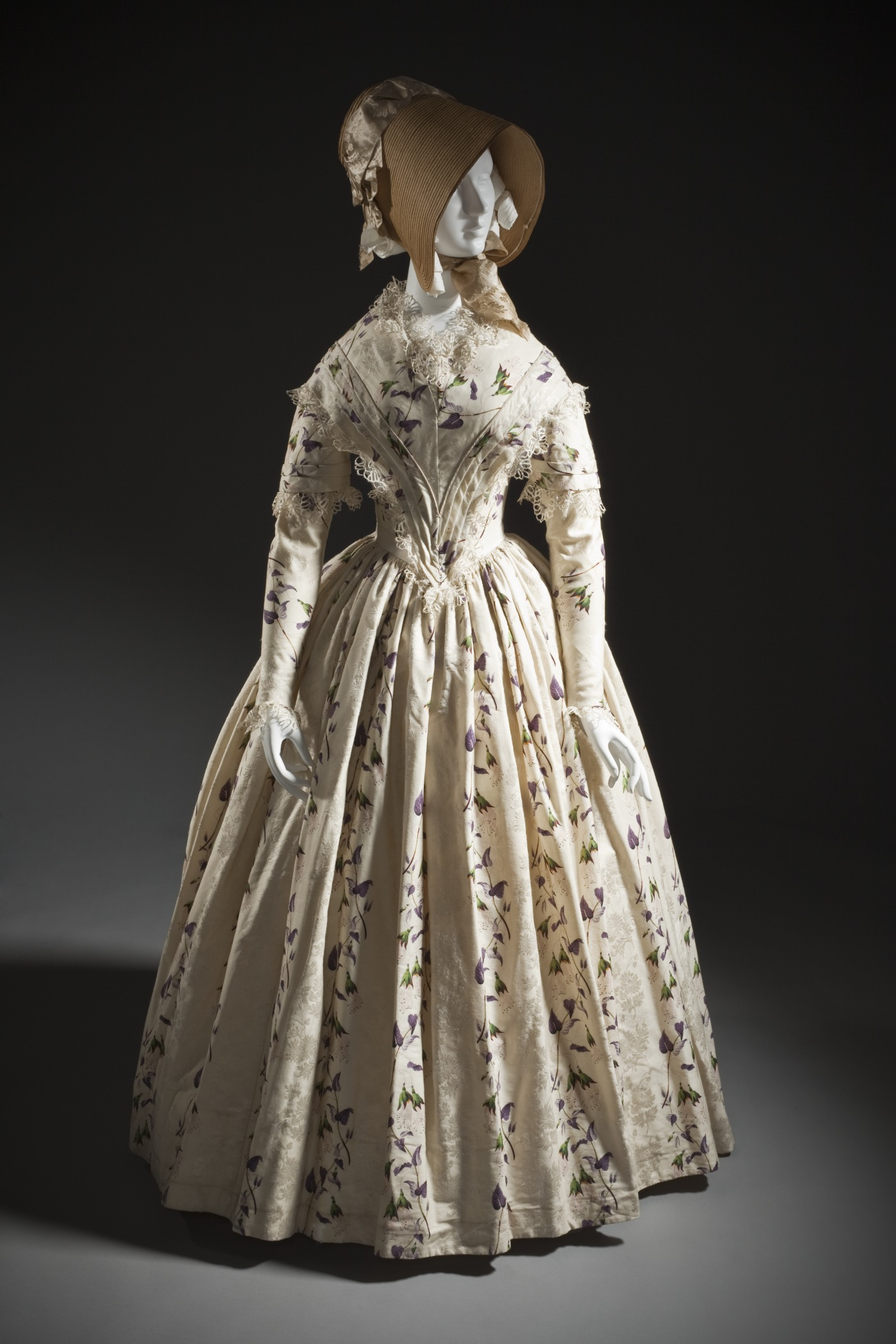
English silk day dress, 2nd half of the 1840s, with dropped shoulder seams, tight sleeves and a pointed waist.

Although corsets narrowed the bodices and gave them a point in the early 1840s, by the end of the decade, they returned to the natural waistline. Corsets lost their straps by the end of the decade. Busks in the front of the corset were split by Jean Julien Josselin in 1829, but the corset was not reliable at staying closed until 1848 when Joseph Cooper patented the "slot and stud" closure, which is still in use today.

Necklines remained wide with further use of lace berthas to frame the upper body. At the end of the decade, necklines were raised and remained high.

Dresses were stiffer due to boning in the bodice as well as the corset. Skirts lengthened, while in 1847 widths increased with the introduction of the horsehair crinoline, a petticoat stiffened with horsehair and starch. Skirts often had one or two flounces at the bottom that increased the look of fullness (see, for example, the 1844 fashion plate, right). The petticoats were numerous and became bulky and heavy and sometimes entangled the feet. Petticoats had another disadvantage: the number of waistbands increased with each additional petticoat.

To achieve the narrow waist, skirts were attached to bodices using very tight organ pleats "secured at every other fold."

Sleeves narrowed with smaller decorative additions (see, for example, the English silk day dress, left). They eventually widened at the wrists into open pagoda-type sleeves requiring engageants to cover the forearms.

Shawls were used to convert a simple dress into a more formal ensemble. The popularity of shawls grew because of the very soft and beautifully dyed and woven cashmere shawls from India with a paisley design (named after the Scottish town that manufactured shawls). Head coverings were de regueur, dominated by poke bonnets. (The mannequin in the English silk day dress, above left, is wearing a poke bonnet.) Cosmetics became more popular, with instructions printed in the Handbook of the Toilette (for those without knowledgeable lady's maids), widely available beginning in 1839. Unfortunately some beauty products contained toxic elements like the calcium oxide (or quicklime) found in hair dye, which was recommended to be left in the hair for 3 to 8 hours.

By the end of the 1840s skirts were more dome shaped, necklines were higher and wider and sleeves broadened at the bottom.

==== Working-class women's dress ====
Working-class women's dress varied from the middle- and upper-class women's dress for practical reasons and for identifying their work. For example, Judith Flanders describes fruit, vegetable and basket sellers in city markets:

In the 1840s, these women wore loose gowns looped and pinned up out of the dirt, showing their thick underskirts and boots; on their heads were velveteen or straw bonnets, with net caps underneath. Men and women alike wore luridly coloured silk ‘kingsman’ kerchiefs around their necks. (241 [of 972])

=== 1850s dress style ===
The 1850s saw revolutionary changes in technologies affecting the manufacture and consumption of clothing, especially

- the mass production of fabrics
- the invention of synthetic dyes
- the manufacture of inexpensive, flexible and lightweight steel
- the invention of a sewing machine that could be used in the home
- the spread of fashion journalism and journalism for women

According to the Dictionary of Nineteenth-Century Journalism, "The 1850s and 1860s saw the eclipse of the older ladies' journals [that began in the 18th century and targeted upper-class women] and the emergence of the magazine for middle-class ... women." Nine fashion magazines were being published in London by 1850 and fourteen by 1859 as part of the burgeoning collection of magazines for women, including both domestic journalism aimed at middle-class women and journalism focused mostly on fashion. The journalism aimed at middle-class women introduced haute couture, making the styles, names of couturiers and fashion houses familiar to them for the first time.

These technological changes were revolutionary because of the impact they had on fashion over the course of the rest of the century. Their impact on fashion arises largely because most women were taught a wide range of sewing skills and, due to reforms in education over the century, more women could read, so they used their skills and literacies to have more agency over what they wore.

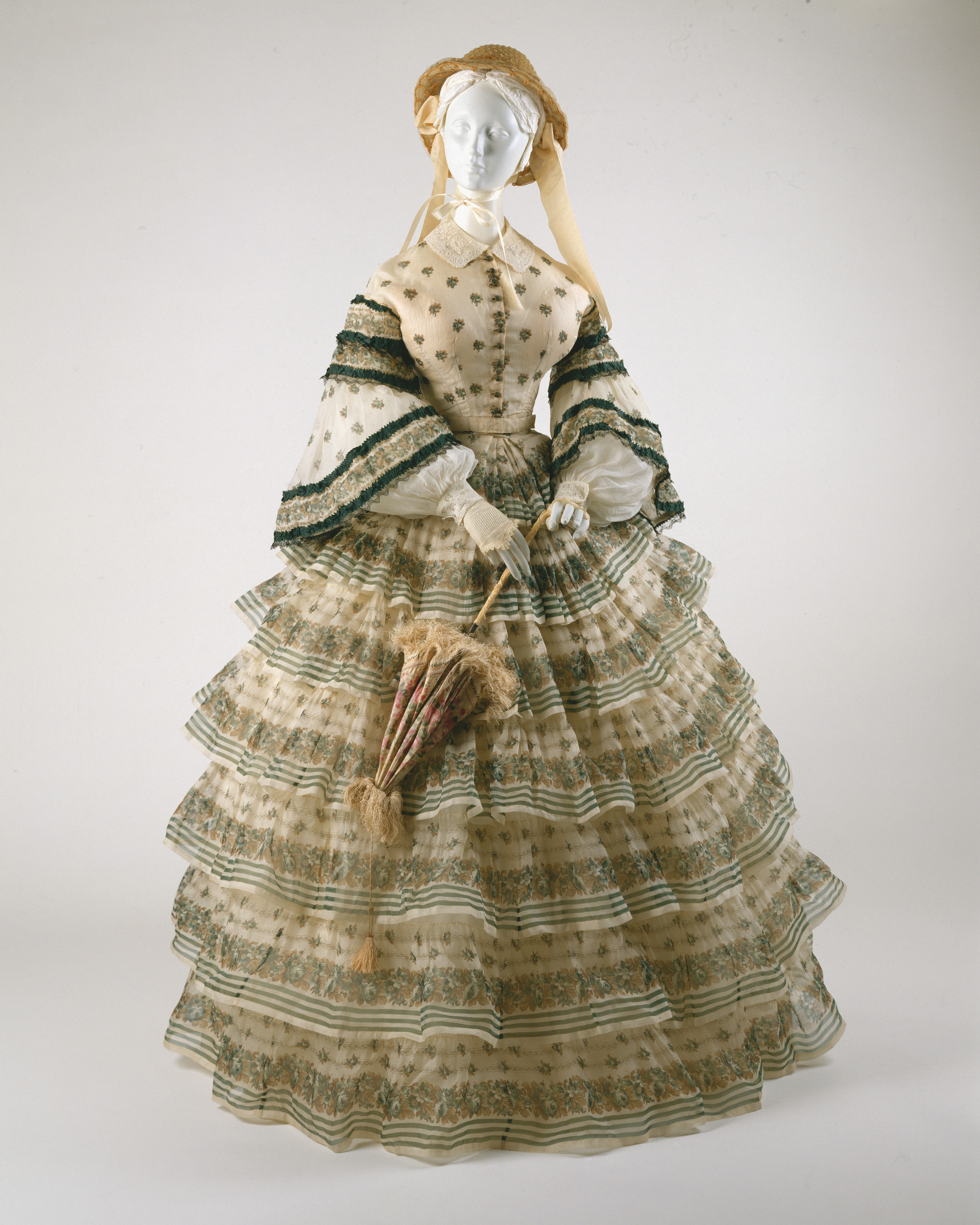
A day ensemble c. 1855, featuring tiers of ruffles and pagoda style sleeves

==== Silhouette ====
The 1850s are considered a transitional decade in 19th-century fashion because little changed in the silhouette and appearance of clothing, but technological changes would make increasingly important structural differences in what was available for people to wear.

Skirts widened with the disappearance of the many layers of petticoats but did not change their basic dome shape. Beyond the silhouette, the design elements of the dress (like sleeves, neckline, or skirt) were barely changed as they evolved from the 1840s to the 1860s.

While the silhouette and elements of design did not change significantly, the effect of the technological changes related to the manufacture and consumption of clothing was to give individual (and especially middle-class) women more agency over how their dresses got made and who made them, what fabrics their dresses were made of, how broad a range of options they could choose from and how easy it was to move in their dresses.

The number of flounces and ruffles on the skirt increased, making the skirt look wider (see the c. 1855 day ensemble, right).

==== Neckline ====
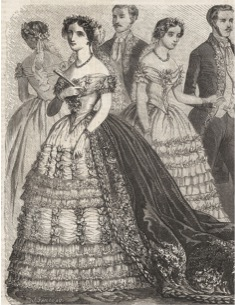
1850s evening dress with a bertha

With trim and a front closure in the corset and the bodice, the bodice emphasized a distinct V-shape. Necklines of day dresses were sometimes cut into a V-shape, causing a need to cover the bust area with a chemisette. For evening, a wide, low neckline was popular, often with a bertha (see the 1850s evening dress with a bertha, left).

==== Sleeves ====
Pagoda sleeves and under sleeves (engageants) continued to be popular for most of the decade.

==== Foundations ====
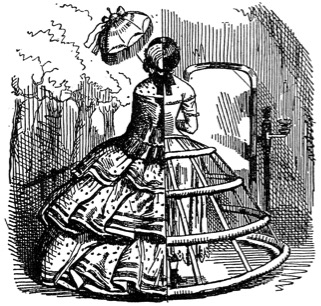
1850s fashionable silhouette and the cage crinoline needed to support it.

In 1856, the invention of the first cage crinoline allowed for wider skirts than petticoats could. The cage crinoline was constructed by joining thin metal strips together with wires to form a circular cage-like structure that could support a very wide skirt (see 1950s silhouette and cage crinoline, right). Although often ridiculed by journalists and cartoonists of the time as the crinoline swelled in size, this innovation freed women from the heavy weight of petticoats. Technological advancement made cage crinolines possible. Not visible on the outside garment, the cage crinoline was the foundation for the huge dome-shaped skirts that dominated the end of the decade. It was safer and easier to walk in a cage because the hoops held the skirt away from the feet and legs of the wearer.

Without the innumerable petticoats more women began to wear drawers or "pantalettes" for modesty and warmth. The dome shape that was made possible by the cage foundation changed the way skirts were cut. Instead of rectangles for the skirt pieces, gores were wider at the bottom than the top, preventing bulkiness at the waist from gathered fabric and creating a much wider skirt bottom. Pantalettes had no seam between the legs; the crotch of the garment was simply left open.

Bloomers, designed by American Amelia Jenks Bloomer, introduced bifurcated garments for women, essentially trousers or pants with a seam between the legs. Bloomer's experiment failed, and most women didn’t wear pants until the 20th century, but we know that some women were prepared if an accident with their cage exposed them. For example, Louise, Duchess of Manchester (later Duchess of Devonshire) was wearing a cage in 1859 when one of her hoops caught in a stile she was crossing and she fell. She landed "on her feet with her cage and whole petticoats remaining above her head," revealing "to all the world in general and the Duc de Malakoff in particular" that she was wearing "a pair of scarlet tartan knickerbockers," the kind of knee-length garment men would wear when hunting. (25) Also, images from the 1880s sometimes show women on bicycles wearing knickerbockers (but not trousers).

The 1850s saw two other developments that permanently changed the clothing available to Victorian women (and men). Created in 1856, the first synthetic dyes were much more vivid and vibrant than natural dyes and resistant to fading. Because Victorian photography was black and white, we do not typically see the gaudy and saturated colours that many Victorians loved. Commercial sewing machines made individual articles of clothing much more plentiful and inexpensive, with the greatest impact on men's clothing. The invention and widespread sale of the "lightweight domestic machine" for home sewing affected large numbers of upper-working-class and middle-class women.

Cage crinolines remained popular for perhaps 5 years among the fashion forward and perhaps 10 years for the less adventurous, until about the end of the 1860s.

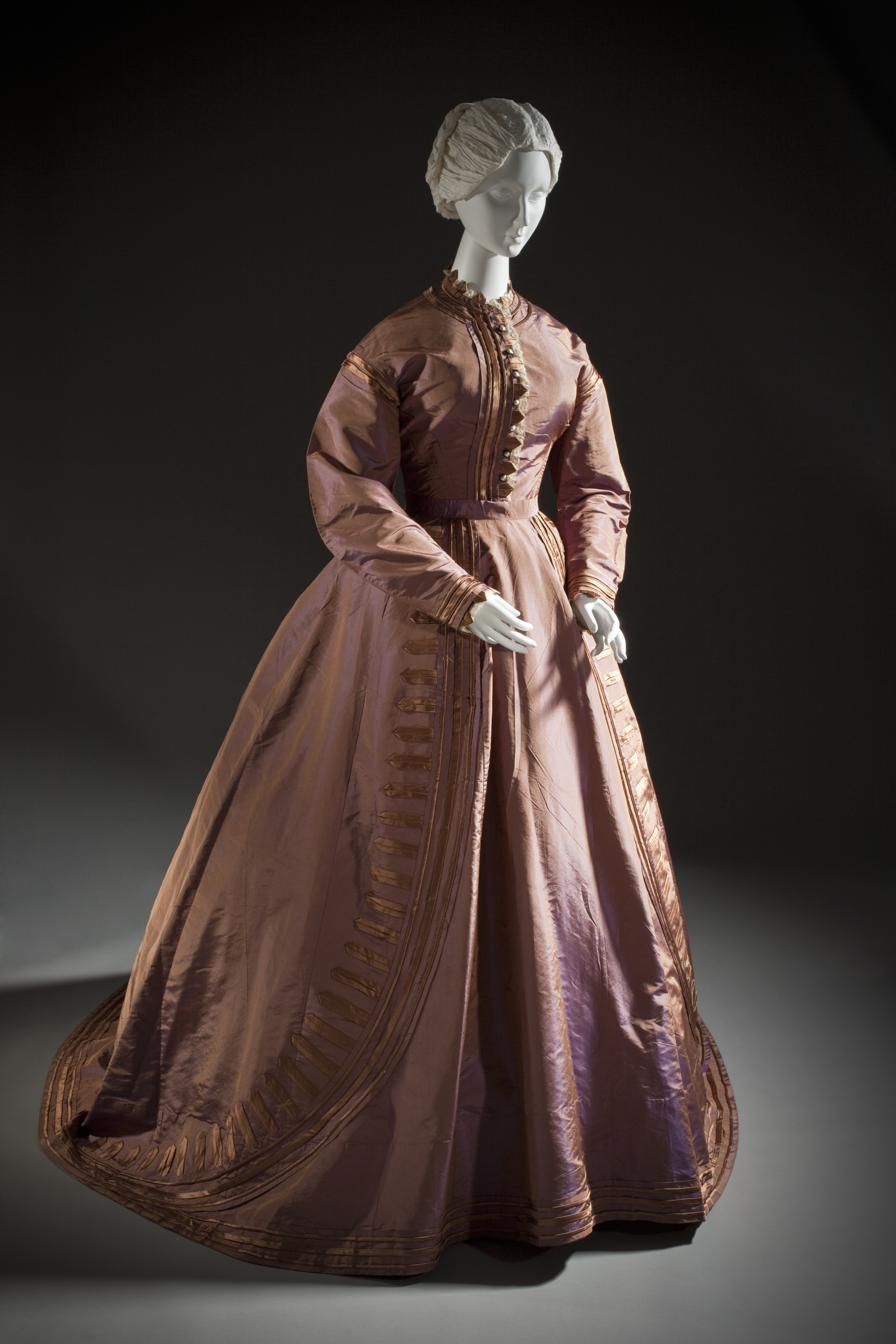
An English silk morning dress

=== 1860s dress style ===
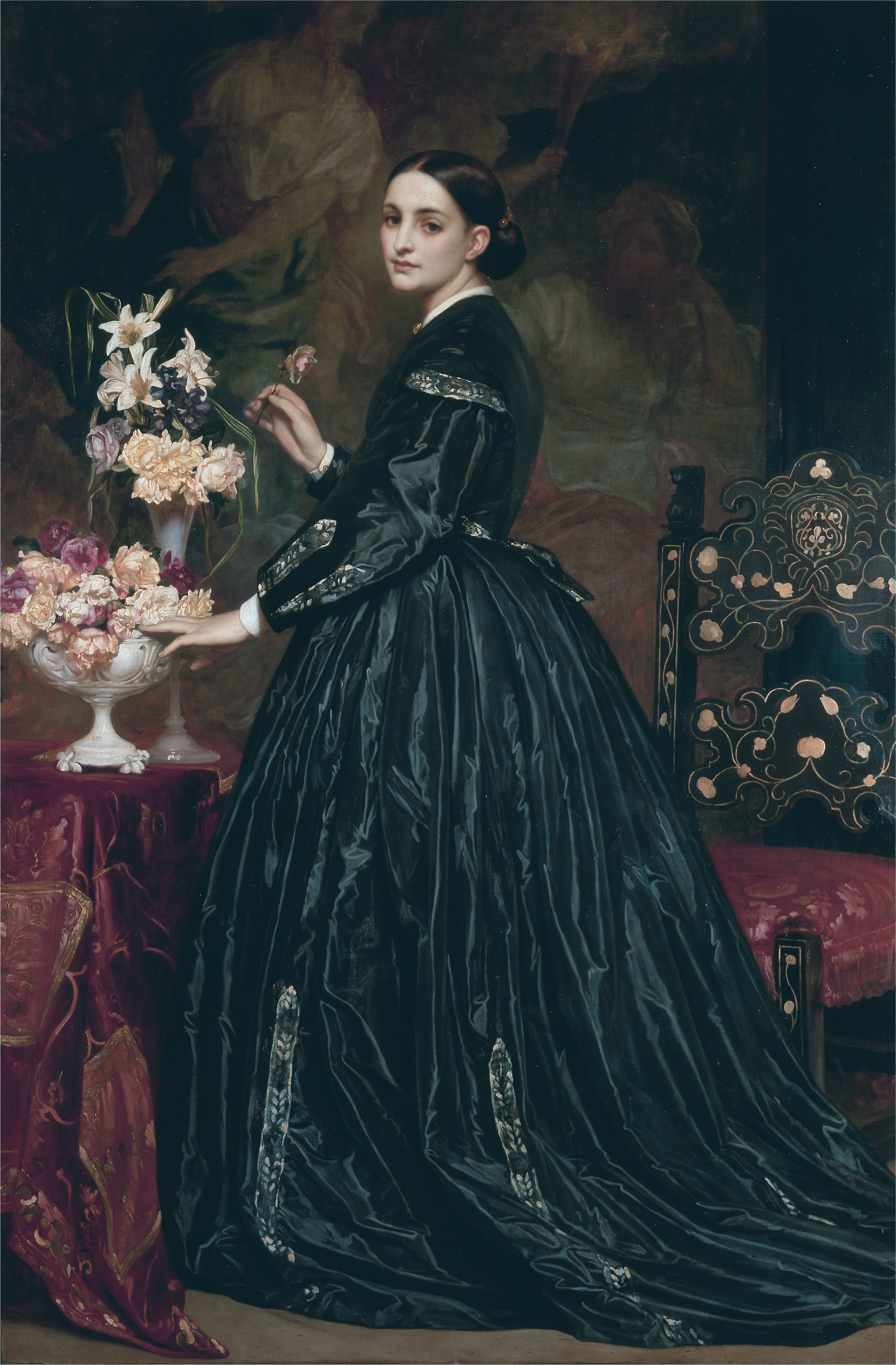
English dress in 1864, showcasing bishop sleeves and simple trim.

==== Foundations ====
The cage crenoline reached its greatest width during the 1860s. Photographs show that the fashion-forward Empress Eugénie of France, Empress Elisabeth of Austria and Countess Pauline von Metternich had stopped wearing the very large crinoline cages as early as 1862, but most middle- and upper-class women (including Queen Victoria) wore them for much of the rest of the decade.

During the first half of the 1860s, crinolines began decreasing in size at the top, while retaining their volume at the bottom, creating a more pyramidal shape. Then the fullness began to move to the back while the front became flat and close to the body. As the back fullness increased, skirts sometimes lengthened into trains. (The 1865 English silk dress, right, shows the flattening of the front at the waist and the development of the train.) In order to emphasize the back, the train was gathered together to form soft folds and draperies. This line or silhouette would eventually evolve into a bustle in the next decade.

Decoration or trim often appeared only at the bottom of the skirt (see English dress, 1864, below right). Flounces and ruffles diminished as geometric designs in trim gained popularity. Skirts were also decorated with overskirts of the same fabric or a different shade of the same color. Waistlines were pointed in front below the natural waistline. By mid-century the waist was seated at the natural waistline often with a wide belt and large decorative buckle.

==== Bodices and Sleeves ====
Bodices often had buttons down the front because both the corset and the bodice opened in the front. Necklines were generally high and rounded. Some dresses were cut without separating the bodice and skirt so it could be buttoned from the neck to the bottom of the skirt. It became popular for dresses to be made as one skirt and two bodices, one for day wear and one for formal wear.

Sleeves narrowed but remained loose on the arms and were wrist length. Sometimes the sleeves were full at the shoulder, but they were not very puffed.

==== General Trends ====
A greater and richer variety of fabrics was available to the always upwardly-aspirational middle class, with silk essential in the dress of wealthy middle- and upper-class women. Dresses were cut and pieced together to accommodate the more active life women had in sports, walking and even riding bicycles. The trends that began in the 1860s continued through the 1870s and into the 1880s; the changes were evolutionary.

=== 1870s dress style ===
==== Silhouette ====
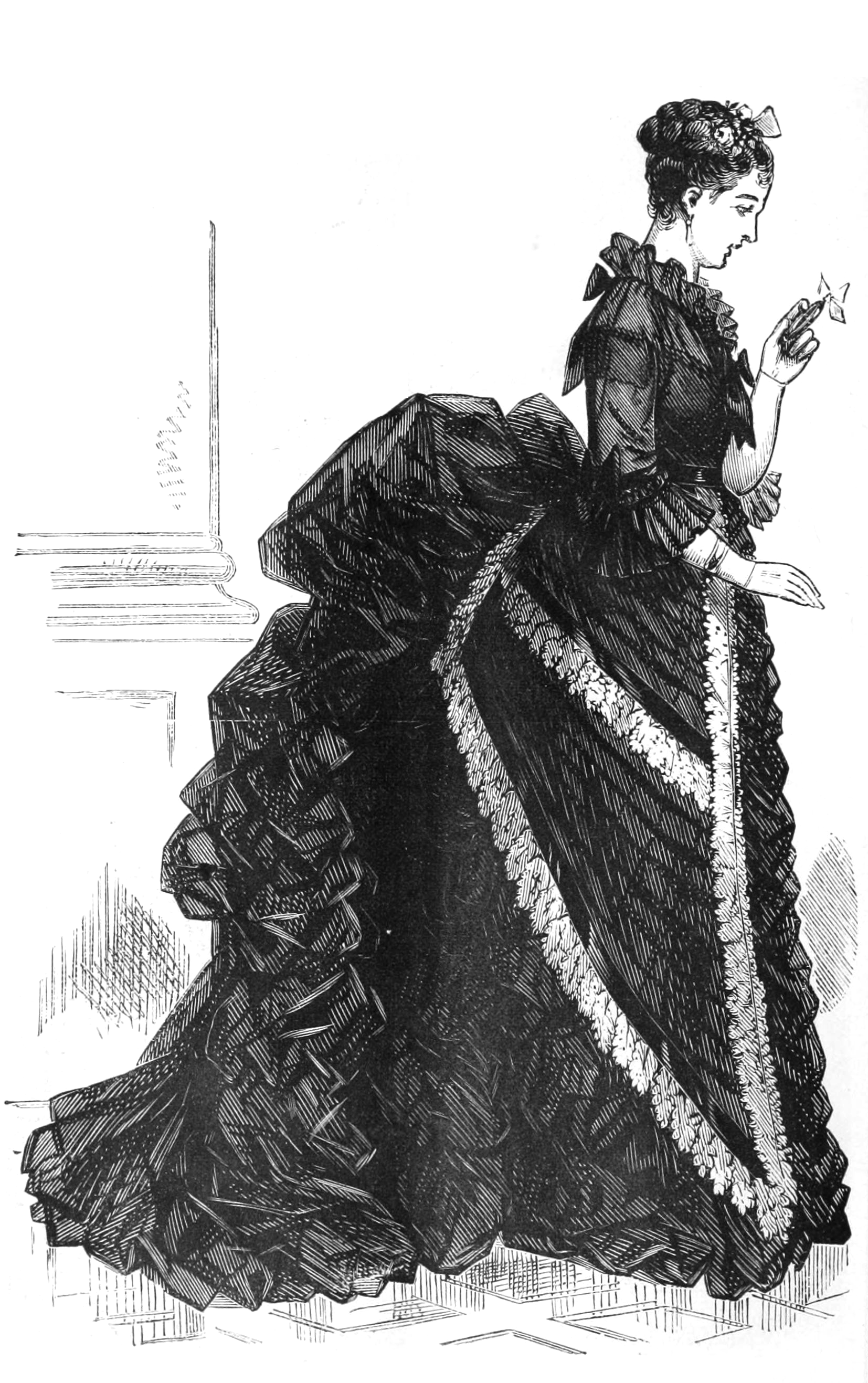
A black net ball dress, 1874

The style of the 1870s was characterized by an abundance of draperies and trims, in a rococo revival. The trend for broad skirts slowly disappeared during the 1870s, as the skirts moved from a crinolette supported form to the bustle and later a more streamlined silhouette. The waistline of the early 1870s was high, necklines varied, while armsyce remained off the shoulder. An overskirt was extremely popular, often tied up into an apron effect at the front with a polonaise or puffed draperies at the back.

Beginning in 1877, dresses moulded to fit the figure, as increasingly slimmer and more restrictive silhouettes were favored. Although dress styles took on a more natural form, corsetry was still required and the now de regueur train was often supported with a bustle cage. The armscye, for the first time in the Victorian period, moved from a dropped position up to the shoulders and would remain there for the rest of the era.

The most famous designer of this conservative, very fitted and restrictive style was British-born but Paris-based Frederick Worth, who designed the “princess” construction for dresses, which we still use today, and who popularized and then “killed,” according to his obituary in The Lady’s Treasury, the crinoline cage. The princess construction was named for Alexandra, Princess of Wales, who preferred a lean, tailored style. By 1879 corsets were being built using "princess" seams to support the tailoring of the smooth, straight dresses like the ones designed by Maison Worth.

Because Queen Victoria had been wearing mourning dress since 1861, Princess Alexandra was expected to lead in the haute couture of the day. She set a trend for tailored dresses that was quickly picked up by women of all classes. Unlike the tailored designs, what Maison Worth created was ornate with many decorative elements, including fringe, which was widely used (along with ribbon, braid, ball fringe, ruching, epaulettes, pieces of the same fabric in a lighter or darker shade, pieces of a different-textured fabric like velvet or velveteen, etc.).

No single silhouette dominated the 1870s, however, because of the different lines created by the bustle, the overskirt and the layers of the polonaise, or a combination of these three skirt treatments. Foundation garments changed very little, although perhaps the greatest change came in corsets. In 1870 women were wearing corsets that came to just below the waist with a pointed center front.

==== Skirts ====
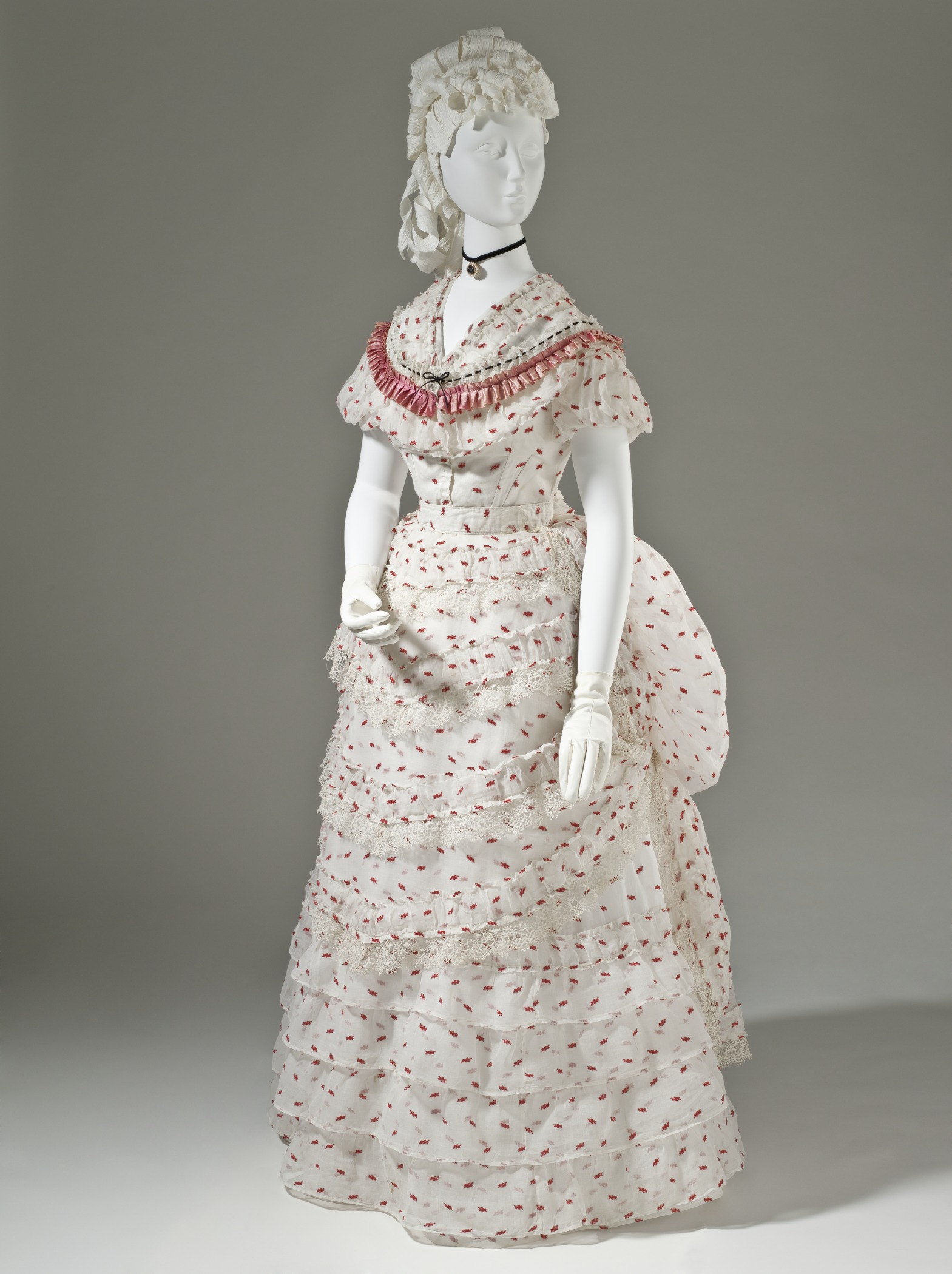
An c. 1875 English polonaise

The trend for wide skirts slowly disappeared during the 1870s, as women started to prefer a slimmer silhouette. Skirts evolved from their most extreme width to their most narrow, waists went to a natural level and the back of the dress became the focal point of the design. The relationship between the various skirt treatments was very complex, in part because skirts became architectural. (The bustle on the 1874 black net ball dress, above right, has been gathered and bunched and would require padding to keep the draping in place. It also has an overskirt.)

The skirt began the decade rather flat in front with most of the fabric pulled to the back and pleated. As the skirt evolved, the gathered fabric draped gracefully at the back. In the next step in the evolution, the extra fabric was bunched into large poufs below the waist in back. Then a pad supported the extra fabric, and then by the end of the decade a tournure or bustle kept the elaborate draping of the back of the skirt and train in place. In general, trains were present on every dress, including day dresses, but they were narrower and longer with tiers and drapes. Trains were kept off the ground by petticoats that were sewn under them and that could be washed separately.

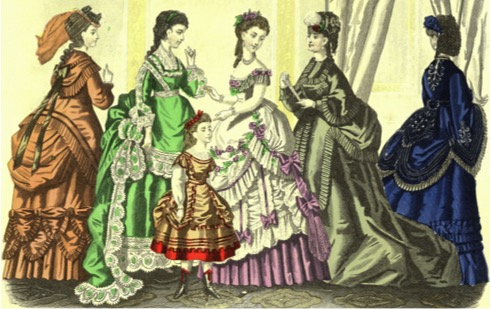
Early 1870s fashion plate, overskirts

Overskirts became extremely popular, often tied up into an apron effect at the front with a polonaise or puffed draperies at the back. A revival of an 18th-century romanticization of what a milkmaid might have worn, the 1870s polonaise is a garment featuring both an overskirt and bodice often of the same fabric (see c. 1875 English polonaise, left). Over time, the overskirt shortened into a detached basque, resulting in an elongation of the bodice over the hips. (The early 1870s fashion plate, right, shows an assortment of ways overskirts were worn, including one for a girl.)

==== The Polonaise in Laura Ingalls Wilder ====
Laura Ingalls Wilder wrote about the hoops her fictionalized self wore the century before, unusually, and calls her dress a Polonaise. Although they are common in current historical fiction, descriptions of foundation garments are rare in the writings of the women who wore them or in the literature of the time. In These Happy Golden Years (1943), Wilder gives a detailed description of the undergarments as well as the foundation garments under her dress, including a bustle, and talks about how they make the Polonaise look on her:

Then carefully over her under-petticoats she put on her hoops. She liked these new hoops. They were the very latest style in the East, and these were the first of the kind that Miss Bell had got. Instead of wires, there were wide tapes across the front, almost to her knees, holding the petticoats so that her dress would lie flat. These tapes held the wire bustle in place at the back, and it was an adjustable bustle. Short lengths of tape were fastened to either end of it; these could be buckled together underneath the bustle to puff it out, either large or small. Or they could be buckled together in front, drawing the bustle down close in back so that a dress rounded smoothly over it. Laura did not like a large bustle, so she buckled the tapes in front.

Then carefully over all she buttoned her best petticoat, and over all the starched petticoats she put on the underskirt of her new dress. It was of brown cambric, fitting smoothly around the top over the bustle, and gored to flare smoothly down over the hoops. At the bottom, just missing the floor, was a twelve-inch-wide flounce of the brown poplin, bound with an inch-wide band of plain brown silk. The poplin was not plain poplin, but striped with an openwork silk stripe.

Then over this underskirt and her starched white corset-cover, Laura put on the polonaise. Its smooth, long sleeves fitted her arms perfectly to the wrists, where a band of the plain silk ended them. The neck was high with a smooth band of the plain silk around the throat. The polonaise fitted tightly and buttoned all down the front with small round buttons covered with the plain brown silk. Below the smooth hips it flared and rippled down and covered the top of the flounce on the underskirt. A band of the plain silk finished the polonaise at the bottom.

When a 20th-century Laura Ingalls Wilder calls her character's late-19th-century dress a polonaise, she is probably referring to the "tight, unboned bodice" and perhaps a simple, modest look like the stereotype of a dairy maid. While the bodice was unboned, the fact that she is wearing a corset cover means that she is corseted under it.

==== Neckline ====
Necklines were high, and lines were sleek and fitted.

==== Sleeves ====
Pagoda sleeves began to lose their three-decade-long popularity in 1875, and most sleeve treatments were narrow and came to the wrist.

==== General Trends ====
An unusual trend occurred during the 1870s in hairstyles, which grew very large with added braids, buns, coils, poufs and strands. The elaborate hairstyles required multiple hair pieces and featured tiny, over-decorated hats sometimes fastened almost vertically on the head. Although women had already been supplementing their own hair, these extremely large styles caused enormous demand in the human hair market.

The practice of constructing a dress with one skirt and two bodices (one for day and one for evening wear) continued from the 1860s.

=== 1880s dress style ===
After a period of slim, train-less skirts with heavy decoration, an exaggerated horizontal bustle made a re-appearance in 1883. Due to the additional fullness, drapery moved towards the sides or front panel of the skirt instead. Bodices shortened, now ending above the hips. Skirts were much less full than the last time the bustle was in fashion in the 1870s and instead focused on a slim front with a shelf-like back protrusion.

The 1880s also saw the growing popularity of austere, menswear-inspired tailoring like that preferred by Alexandra, Princess of Wales. The style was not without its critics because its fit did not seem feminine. Some credited the change in silhouette to the various Victorian dress reform movements, which arose from several sectors of society over the second half of the century. The Artistic Dress movement founded in the Pre-Raphaelite Brotherhood and the Rational Dress movement of the mid-to-late Victorian era advocated for a natural silhouette, natural dyes and natural fibers, rejecting the traditional foundation garments of corset and cage (both crinoline and bustle). The Rational Dress movement saw women "handicapped" and their health injured by "tightly laced corsets, cumbersome dress improvers [padding], and unwieldy crinolettes [small cages]."

That is, the tailored, mens-wear style was a response to the traditional, highly feminized look that was dominated by a large protruding, almost horizontal bustle that the dress reform movements opposed, but sometimes the mens-wear style could be rigid and restrictive as well. The traditional look was heavily decorated and formed a sharp contrast with the simpler, fitted silhouette, the first time in haute couture that "No single style reigned supreme."

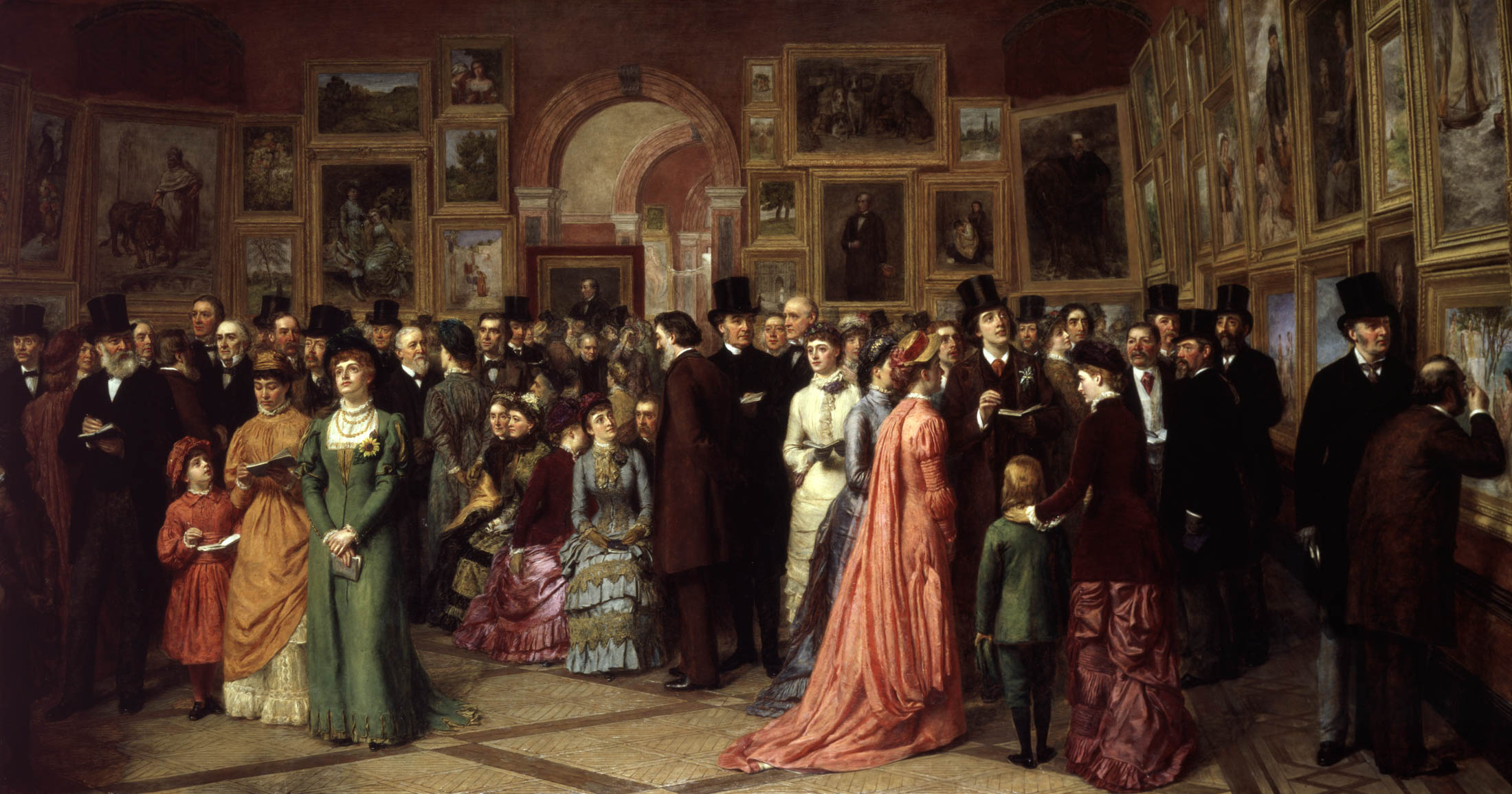
Frith, A Private View, 1883

Like the dress reform movements from earlier in the century, the Aesthetic Dress movement of the end of the century, led to some degree by Oscar Wilde and parodied by William Powell Frith's 1883 A Private View at the Royal Academy, 1881 (right), saw the Worth-style traditional dress as impeding women's agency. Frith's painting (right) opposed the aesthetic movement to traditional dress, targeting Wilde and his followers.

These movements were never mainstream enough to garner widespread support, but a less austere, less restrictive version of the tailored look, based perhaps on riding habits, supported those involved in other sports, like cycling and tennis. If the bodice was made like a jacket, it was tailored for the individual woman. Some women who wore the tailored look, like the Princess of Wales and Empress Elisabeth of Austria, were accentuating their very thin figures, but for many the semi-masculine look was simply a fashionable style and indicated neither advanced views nor the need for practical clothes.

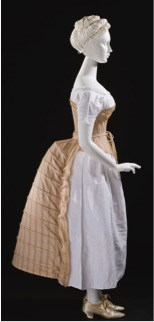
Lobster-tail bustle, c. 1885.

==== Silhouette ====
Two silhouettes dominated this decade, the menswear-inspired, fitted line and the heavily decorated, complex line inspired by the first bustle period of the 1870s. The bustles of the second period in the 1880s were different from the bustles of the 1870s. The 1880s bustle was large, extending sharply and horizontally from the backside, and sported a train, even for day wear. Two distinctly different silhouettes competing for dominance in the same era is extremely unusual. (The dress-reform uncorseted, natural-fiber and -dye style was a third option but one very few women considered.)

For the first two styles, the dresses were very fitted, with narrow sleeves, a tight bodice and a straight skirt, but the bustle style was overdecorated, and the tailored style was sometimes austere but sometimes specifically designed to be easier to move in.

The massive hair pieces of the late 1870s gave way to a simple chignon at the base of the neck that later moved to the top of the head.

Beyond the dress reform movements, the 1880s had no significant inventions or events that impacted the fashion or clothing industries.

==== Foundation ====
Both tailored and traditional silhouettes demanded a corset that had smooth lines and that went below the waist, often one with princess seams. Presumably, the version of the tailored look that was easier to move in had a less restrictive corset or a corset laced less restrictively. The traditional dresses had narrow, decorative bustles that “were more pronounced, projecting sharply outwards” and that had trains attached to the bustle rather than the skirt itself. They looked like a highly decorated shelf coming out of the backside. In fact, the new bustles were a separate garment (see an example of a separate garment tied to the waist, above, right).

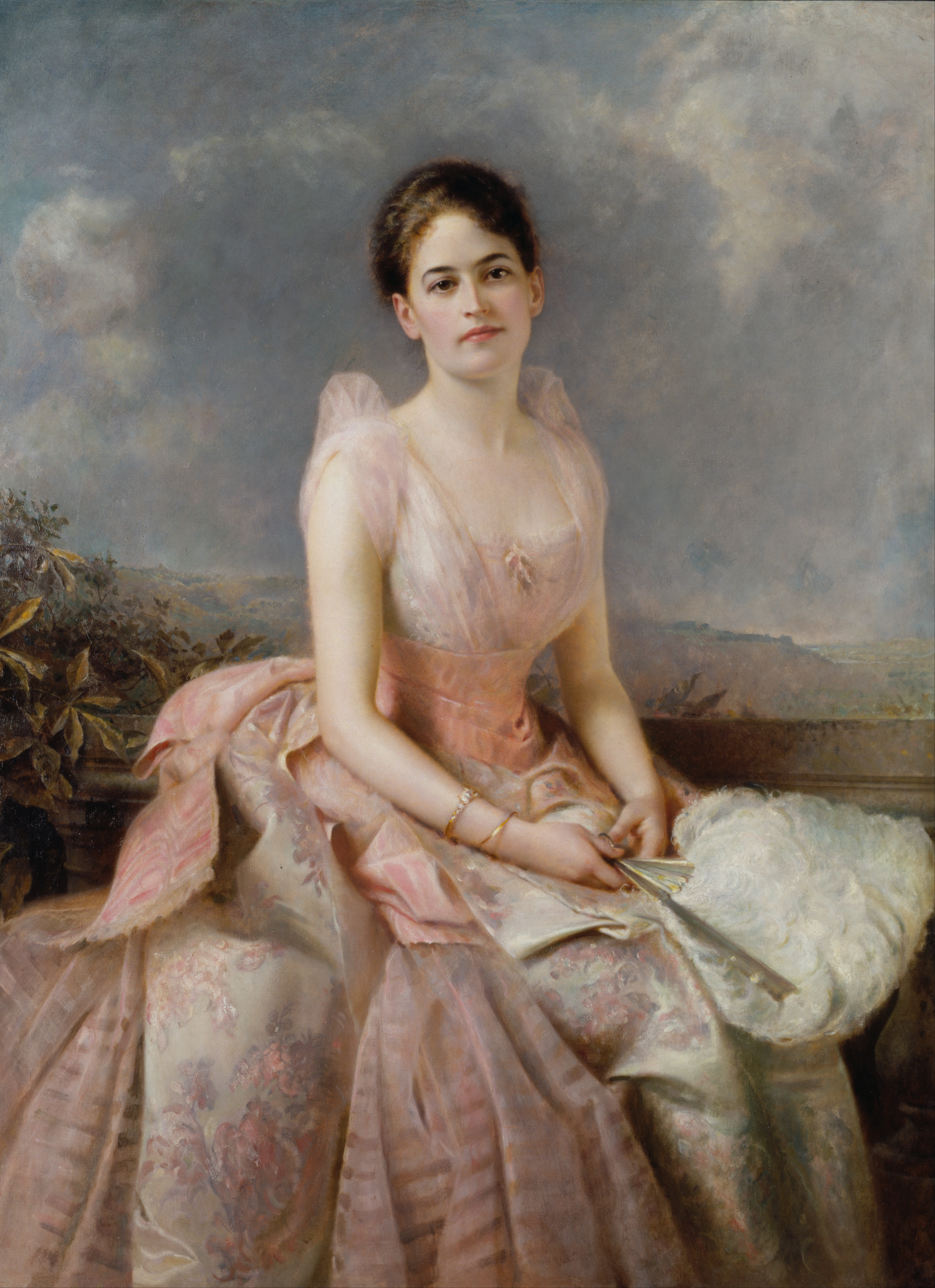
English evening dress with a V-shaped neckline, higher shoulder placement and simple trims, 1887

==== Dresses ====
Some of the tailored dresses were in one piece, buttoning down the front from neckline to hemline with no excess fabric for decorations. More masculinized versions had jackets, vests or waistcoats and even neckties. Some of the tailored dresses had overskirts and separate bodices. The fitted bodices of traditional dresses and the skirts that were straight down in front and on the sides as well as having bustles and trains could make even normal walking difficult.

In the traditional style, the bodice looked more like a suit jacket with a high neckline and a white blouse with a ruffled collar or some kind of feminine neck treatment. Sleeves tightened again during the 1880s and the armscye moved back up the shoulders. Necklines became higher again, with a high collar being ubiquitous for daytime, a trend that would continue into the 1890s. For the evening, the bertha fell out of favor, replaced by V-shaped necklines or draped styles due to the new higher shoulder (V-shaped neckline, right). Near the end of the decade sleeves developed more fullness at the shoulder.

==== Laura Ingalls Wilder's Bustle ====
Even though it sounds like Laura Ingalls Wilder is describing a cage crinoline in the following description of handling her "hoops" in the wind, she is actually describing a structure that has hoops that can be tightened and a bustle attachment that can be flattened. In her 1941 Little Town on the Prairie, Laura Ingalls Wilder writes a scene in which the fictional Laura's hoops have crept up under skirts because of the wind. Set in 1882, (??) this very unusual scene shows a young woman highly skilled at getting her hoops back down without letting her undergarments show. No other writer from this time describes any solution to the problem of the wind under hoops or, indeed, a skill like Laura's:

"Well," Laura began; then she stopped and spun round and round, for the strong wind blowing against her always made the wires of her hoop skirt creep slowly upward under her skirts until they bunched around her knees. Then she must whirl around and around until the wires shook loose and spiraled down to the bottom of her skirts where they should be.

As she and Carrie hurried on she began again. "I think it was silly, the way they dressed when Ma was a girl, don't you? Drat this wind!" she exclaimed as the hoops began creeping upward again.

Quietly Carrie stood by while Laura whirled. "I'm glad I'm not old enough to have to wear hoops," she said. "They'd make me dizzy."

"They are rather a nuisance," Laura admitted. "But they are stylish, and when you're my age you'll want to be in style."

The 15-year-old Laura reads the American women's domestic and fashion monthly Godey's Lady's Book and would know what was stylish in Paris and London. Her flexible hoops give her a great deal of control over the shape of her skirt, flattening it in front and reducing or emphasizing the bustle behind, as long as she can manage the wind.

=== 1890s dress style ===
==== Silhouette ====
By 1890, the crinoline and bustle were completely left behind, and skirts flared in an A-line. If bustles were the focal point of the ensemble in the 1880s, then sleeves were the focal point in the 1890s. Menswear influences like necktie-inspired neckwear continued from the previous decade. The two silhouettes of the 1880s marked the abandonment of a single, dominant look, and subsequent periods offered many more choices for women.

Much of the excess trim of the tradititonal style of the 1880s disappeared in the 1890s, and dresses had a softer, less restrictive look. Although they closely fitted the body, dresses were not tight, allowing more freedom of movement. Many more women were participating in sports and other physical activities that required a less structured fit.

The new century would let go of boned foundation garments altogether and shorten skirts radically and bring even more unprecedented changes and variety to feminine attire.

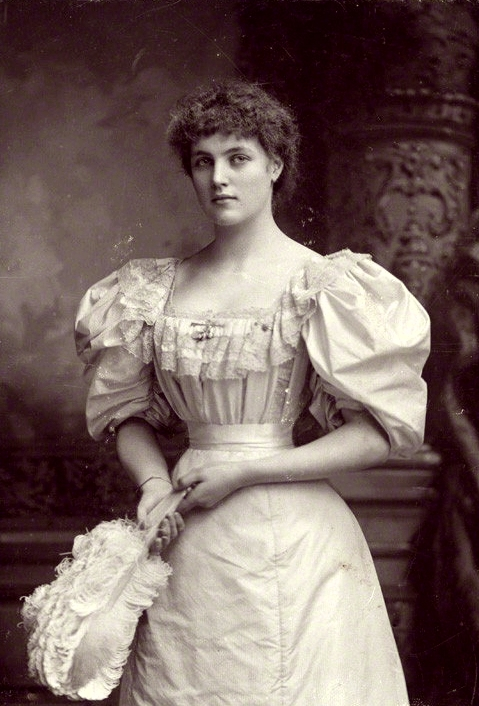
English socialite Lady Beatrice Pole-Carew with puffed sleeves, mid-1890s

==== Foundations ====
Larger busts were more fashionable, leading to a variety of different kinds of padding to place in the corset and make the bust look bigger. Corsets continued to reach well below the waist, smoothing the front of the dress.

==== Skirts ====
Bustles were left behind in the 1880s and skirts, cut in gores, were smooth, fitted close to the waist and hips until they flared outward. Away from the knees, the gores widened the skirts into an A-line.

==== Necklines and Sleeves ====
Daywear dresses had very high necks with a kind of Mandarin collar or military band of fabric around the neck. A large brooch could be worn on such a collar.

At the beginning of the 1890s a small puff of fullness was seen at the shoulders but increased in size in the middle of the decade to a puffed leg-of-mutton style. From the elbow to the wrist or onto the hand, sleeves were tight fitting. By 1896 sleeves grew to a volume rivaling the 1830s from the natural shoulder line to the elbow and even sometimes required stuffing or padding to retain their fullness (see portrait of Lady Beatrice Pole-Carew, right). By 1900 the entire sleeve was "straight and narrow again." Even though leg-of-mutton sleeves lasted only a few years (beginning to shrink the first season after their peak in 1896) we associate the 1890s with them, perhaps because they are so distinctive.

== Hats and headwear ==
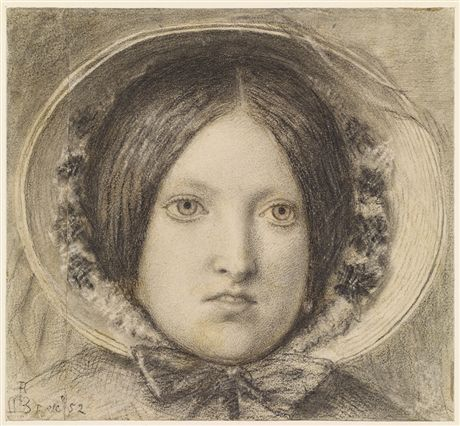
Emma Hill by Ford Madox Brown (1853), a woman wearing a later version of the poke bonnet

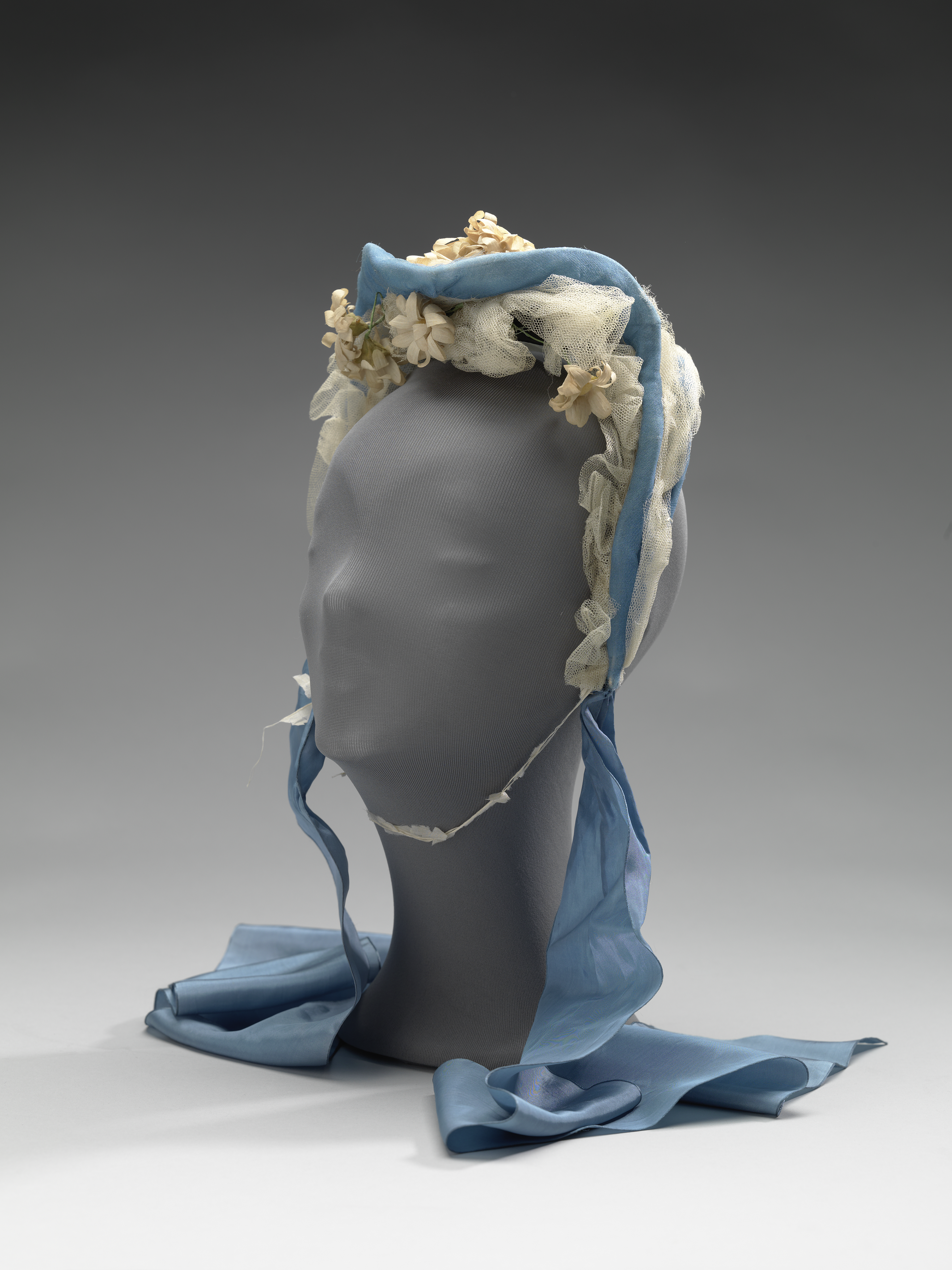
Perched bonnet style of the early 1870s.

Hats were crucial to a respectable appearance for both men and women. To go bareheaded was simply not proper. The top hat, for example, was standard formal wear for upper- and middle-class men. According to Blanche Payne, "The high top hat, usually black or dark gray, had reacched its characteristic shape by 1798 and dominated the entire nineteenth century." (457–58)

For women, the styles of hats changed over time and were designed to match their outfits.

During the early Victorian decades, hats were modest in size and design, straw and fabric bonnets being the popular choice. Poke bonnets, which had been worn during the late Regency period, had high, small crowns and brims that grew larger until the 1830s, when the face of a woman wearing a poke bonnet could only be seen directly from the front. They had rounded brims, echoing the rounded form of the bell-shaped hoop skirts.

Bonnets shrunk at the end of the 1860s and moved to a perched position in the early 1870s as hairstyles grew in scale and intricacy. This led to the popularization of hats, which became the headwear of choice for the remainder of the Victorian era.

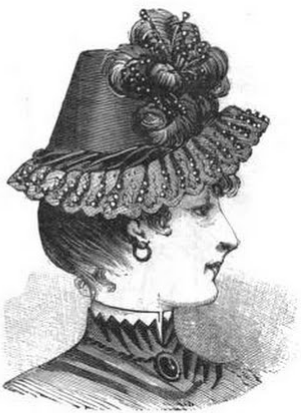
Flower pot style hat of 1885.

The 1880s saw a hat inspired by the top hat for women known as the flowerpot hat, and the 1890s saw the popularity of the boater. The hats of the late Victorian era were covered with elaborate creations of silk flowers, ribbons, and above all, exotic plumes; hats sometimes included entire exotic birds that had been stuffed. Many of these plumes came from birds in the Florida everglades, which were nearly made entirely extinct by overhunting. By 1899, early environmentalists like Adeline Knapp were engaged in efforts to curtail the hunting for plumes. By 1900, more than five million birds a year were being slaughtered, and nearly 95 per cent of Florida's shore birds had been killed by plume hunters.

== Shoes ==
The women's shoes of the early Victorian period were narrow and heelless, in black or white satin. By the 1850s and 1860s, they were slightly broader with a low heel and made of leather or cloth. Ankle-length laced or buttoned boots were also popular. From the 1870s to the twentieth century, heels grew higher and toes more pointed. Low-cut pumps were worn for the evening.

== Men's fashion ==
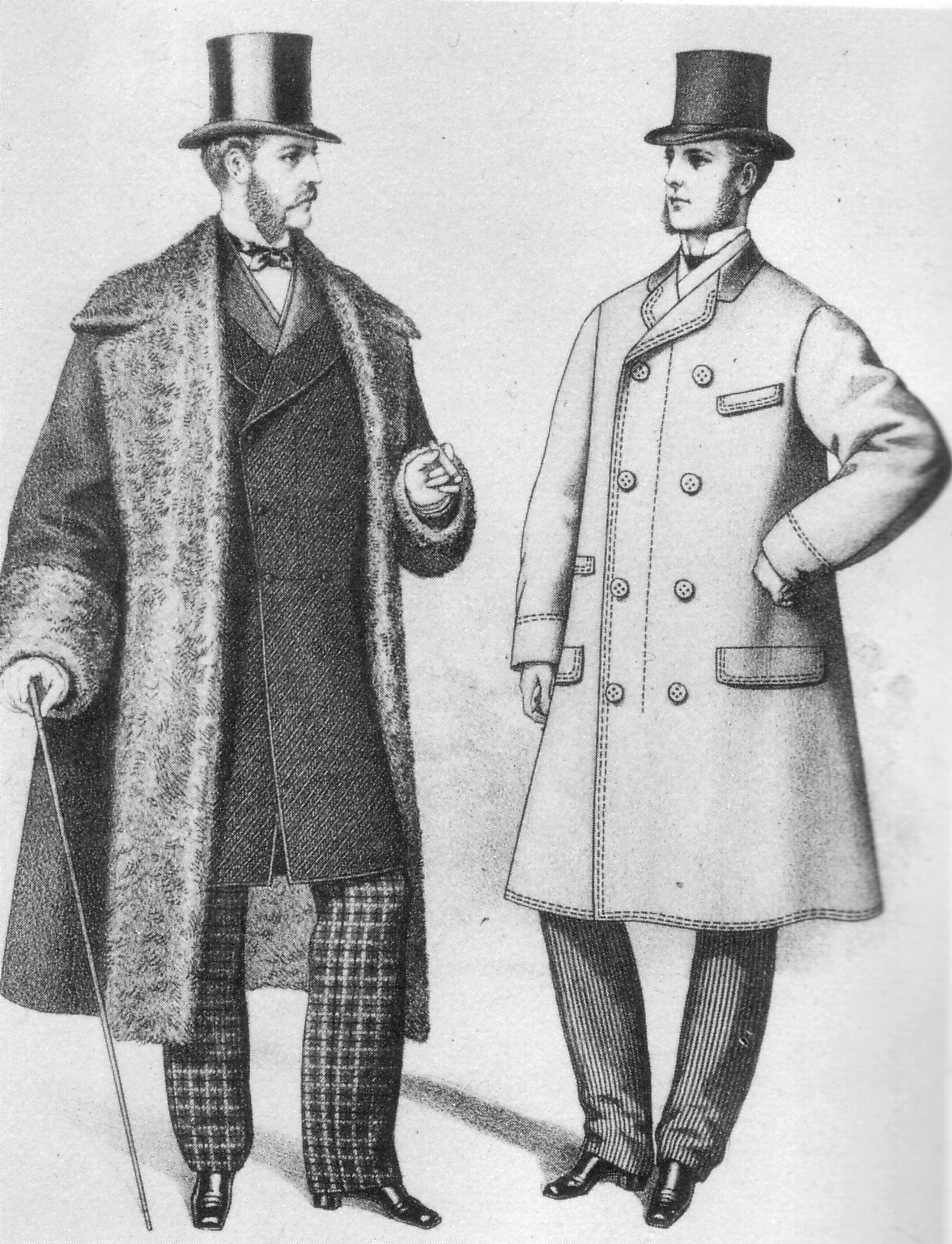
Drawing of Victorian men 1870s

During the 1840s, men wore tight-fitting, calf length frock coats and a waistcoat or vest. Sleeves were full at the top and waists were tight, creating an hourglass form. Waistcoats were single- or double-breasted, with shawl or notched collars, and might be finished in double points at the lowered waist. For more formal occasions, a cutaway morning coat was worn with light trousers during the daytime, and a dark tail coat and trousers was worn in the evening. Shirts were made of linen or cotton with low collars, occasionally turned down, and were worn with wide cravats or neck ties. Trousers had fly fronts, and breeches were used for formal functions and when horseback riding. Men wore top hats, with wide brims in sunny weather.

During the 1850s, men started wearing shirts with high upstanding or turnover collars and four-in-hand neckties tied in a bow, or tied in a knot with the pointed ends sticking out like "wings". The upper-class continued to wear top hats, and bowler hats were worn by the working class.

In the 1860s, men started wearing wider neckties that were tied in a bow or looped into a loose knot and fastened with a stickpin. Frock coats were shortened to knee-length and were worn for business, while the mid-thigh length sack coat slowly displaced the frock coat for less-formal occasions, with the overall effect of a looser silhouette. Top hats briefly became the very tall "stovepipe" shape, but a variety of other hat shapes were popular.

During the 1870s, three-piece suits grew in popularity along with patterned fabrics for shirts. Neckties were the four-in-hand and, later, the Ascot ties. A narrow ribbon tie was an alternative for tropical climates, especially in the Americas. Both frock coats and sack coats became shorter and more form fitting. Flat straw boaters were worn when boating.

During the 1880s, formal evening dress remained a dark tail coat and trousers with a dark waistcoat, a white bow tie, and a shirt with a winged collar. In mid-decade, the dinner jacket or tuxedo, was used in more relaxed formal occasions. The Norfolk jacket and tweed or woolen breeches were used for rugged outdoor pursuits such as shooting. Knee-length topcoats, often with contrasting velvet or fur collars, and calf-length overcoats were worn in winter. Men's shoes had higher heels and a narrow toe.

Starting from the 1890s, the blazer was introduced, and was worn for sports, sailing, and other casual activities.

Throughout much of the Victorian era most men wore fairly short hair. This was often accompanied by various forms of facial hair including moustaches, side-burns, and full beards. A clean-shaven face did not come back into fashion until the end of the 1880s and early 1890s.

Distinguishing what men really wore from what was marketed to them in periodicals and advertisements is difficult, as reliable records do not exist.

== Mourning black ==
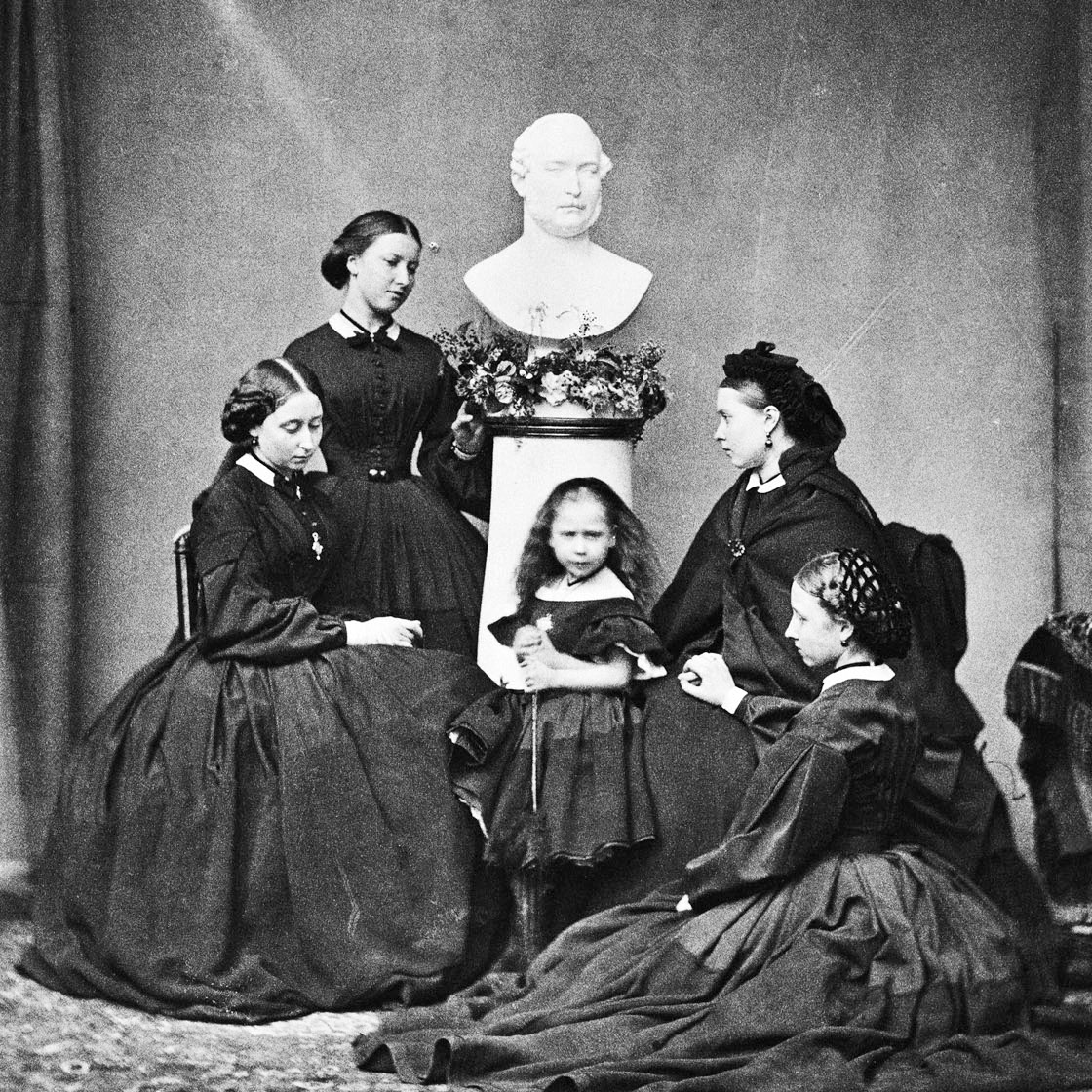
Victoria's five daughters (Alice, Helena, Beatrice, Victoria and Louise), photographed wearing mourning black beneath a bust of their late father, Prince Albert (1862)

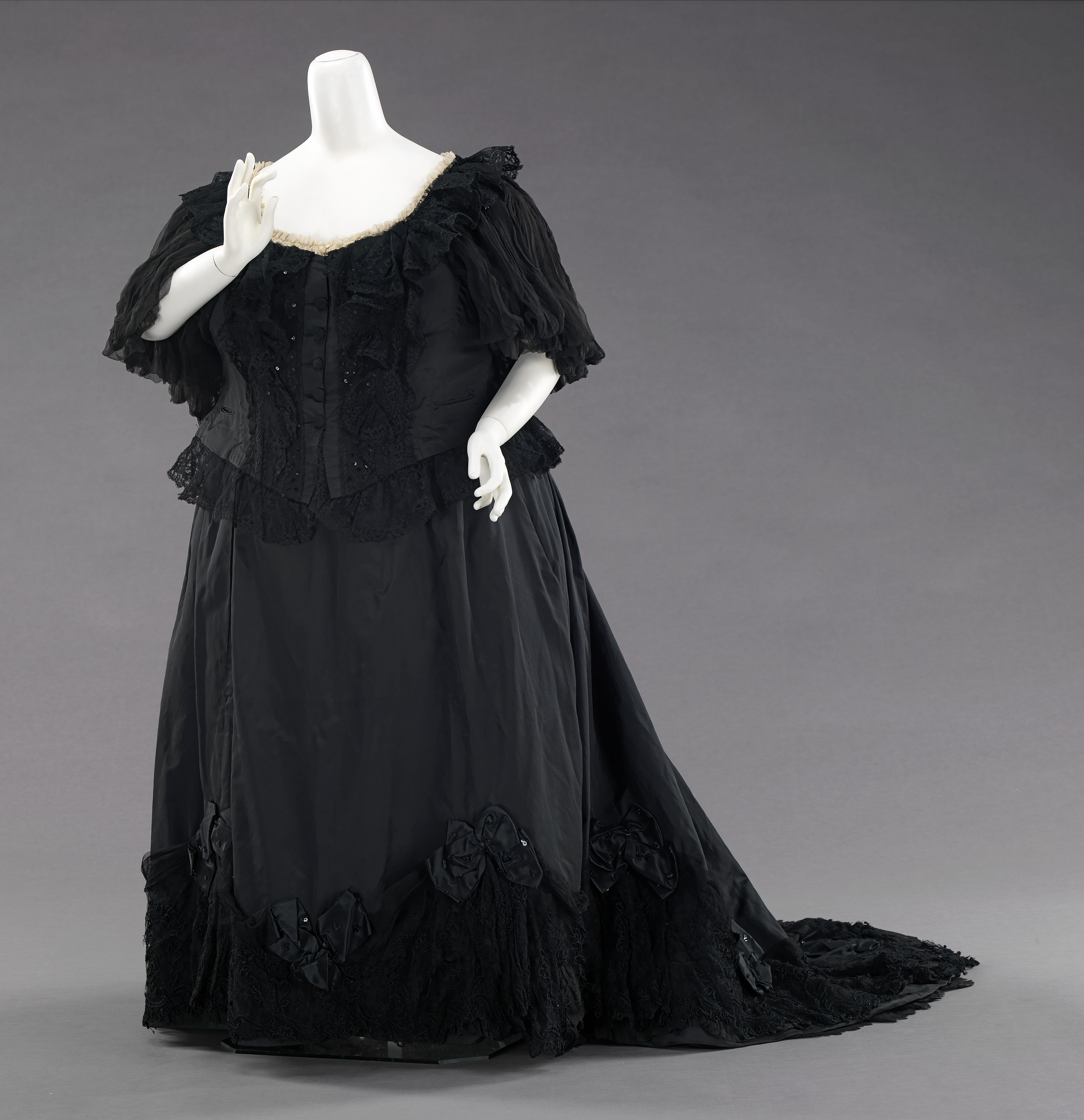
Mourning Dress, 1894–95

In Britain, black is the colour traditionally associated with mourning for the dead. The customs and etiquette expected of men, and especially women, were rigid during much of the Victorian era. The expectations depended on a complex hierarchy of close or distant relationship with the deceased. The closer the relationship, the longer the mourning period and the wearing of black. The wearing of full black was known as First Mourning, which had its own expected attire, including fabrics, and an expected duration of 4 to 18 months. Following the initial period of First Mourning, the mourner would progress to Second Mourning, a transition period of wearing less black, which was followed by Ordinary Mourning, and then Half-mourning. Some of these stages of mourning were shortened or skipped completely if the mourner's relationship to the deceased was more distant. Half-mourning was a transition period when black was replaced by acceptable colours such as lavender and mauve, possibly considered acceptable transition colours because of the tradition of Church of England (and Catholic) clergy wearing lavender or mauve stoles for funeral services, to represent the Passion of Christ.

The mourning dress on the right was worn by Queen Victoria, "it shows the traditional touches of mourning attire, which she wore from the death of her husband, Prince Albert (1819–1861), until her own death."

=== Norms for mourning ===
Manners and Rules of Good Society, or, Solecisms to be Avoided (London, Frederick Warne & Co., 1887) gives clear instructions, such as the following:

Relationship to deceased	First mourning	Second mourning	Ordinary mourning	Half-mourning
Wife for husband	1-year, 1-month; bombazine fabric covered with crepe; widow's cap, lawn cuffs, collars	6 months: less crepe	6 months: no crepe, silk or wool replaces bombazine; in last 3 months jet jewellery and ribbons can be added	6 months: colours permitted are grey, lavender, mauve, and black-and-grey
Daughter for parent	6 months: black with black or white crepe (for young girls); no linen cuffs and collars; no jewellery for first 2 months	4 months: less crepe	–	2 months as above
Wife for husband's parents	18 months in black bombazine with crepe	–	3 months in black	3 months as above
Parent for son- or daughter-in-law's parent	– Black armband in representation of someone lost	–	1-month black	–
Second wife for parent of a first wife	–	–	3 months black	–

The complexity of these etiquette rules extends to specific mourning periods and attire for siblings, step-parents, aunts and uncles distinguished by blood and by marriage, nieces, nephews, first and second cousins, children, infants, and "connections" (who were entitled to ordinary mourning for a period of "1–3 weeks, depending on level of intimacy"). Men were expected to wear mourning black to a lesser extent than women, and for a shorter mourning period. After the mid-19th century, men would wear a black hatband and black suit, but for only half the prescribed period of mourning expected of women. Widowers were expected to mourn for a mere three months, whereas the proper mourning period expected for widows was up to four years. Women who mourned in black for longer periods were accorded great respect in public for their devotion to the departed, the most prominent example being Queen Victoria herself.

Women with lesser financial means tried to keep up with the example being set by the middle and upper classes by dyeing their daily dress. Dyers made most of their income during the Victorian period by dyeing clothes black for mourning.

== Technological advancement ==
Technological advancements not only influenced the economy but brought a major change in the fashion styles worn by men and women. As the Victorian era was based on the principles of gender, race and class. Much advancement was in favor of the upper class as they were the ones who could afford the latest technology and change their fashion styles accordingly. In the 1830s there was introduction of horse hair crinoline that became a symbol of status and wealth as only the upper-class women could wear it. In the 1850s there were more fashion technological advancements hence 1850s could rightly be called a revolution in the Victorian fashion industry such as the innovation of artificial cage crinoline that gave women an artificial hourglass silhouette without layers of petticoats, which was lighter and more hygienic. Synthetic dyes, such as mauveine (aniline purple), were introduced in 1856, adding bright colours to garments. In 1855's Haute couture was introduced as tailoring became more mainstream in years to follow.

Charles Frederick Worth, a prominent English designer, became popular amongst the upper class though its city of destiny always is Paris. Haute couture became popular at the same time that sewing machines were invented. Princess Eugenie of France wore the Englishman dressmaker, Charles Frederick Worth's couture and he instantly became famous in France though he had just arrived in Paris a few years ago. In 1855, Queen Victoria and Prince Albert of Britain welcomed Napoleon III and Eugenie of France to a full state visit to England. Eugenie was considered a fashion icon in France. Queen Victoria, who had been the fashion icon for European high fashion, was inspired by Eugenie's style and the fashions she wore. Later, Queen Victoria also appointed Charles Frederick Worth as her dress maker and he became a prominent designer amongst the European upper class. Charles Frederick Worth is known as the father of the haute couture as later the concept of labels were also invented in the late 19th century as custom, made to fit tailoring became mainstream.

By the 1860s, when made-to-fit tailoring was popular in Europe, crinolines were considered impractical. In the 1870s, women preferred more slimmer silhouettes, hence bodices grew longer and the polonaise, a skirt and bodice made together, was introduced. In the 1870s the Cuirass Bodice, a piece of armour that covers the torso and functions like a corset, was invented. Towards the end of Victoria's reign, dresses were flared naturally as crinolines were rejected by middle-class women. Designers such as Charles Frederick Worth were also against them. All these inventions and changes in fashion led to women's liberation as tailored looks improved posture and were more practical.

== Home decor ==
Home decor started spare, veered into the elaborately draped and decorated style we today regard as Victorian, then embraced the retro-chic of William Morris as well as pseudo-Japonaiserie.

== Contemporary stereotypes ==
=== Modesty ===
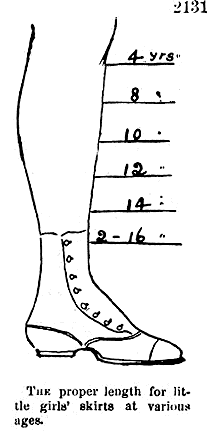
"The proper length for little girls' skirts at various ages", from Harper's Bazaar, showing a 1900 idea of how the hemline should descend towards the ankle as a girl got older

Many myths and exaggerations about the period persist to the modern day. Examples include the idea of men's clothing is seen as formal and stiff, women's as elaborate and over-done; clothing covered the entire body, and even the glimpse of an ankle was scandalous. Critics contend that corsets constricted women's bodies and lives. Homes are described as gloomy, dark, cluttered with massive and over-ornate furniture and proliferating bric-a-brac. Myth has it that even piano legs were scandalous, and covered with tiny pantalettes.

In truth, men's formal clothing may have been less colourful than it was in the previous century, but brilliant waistcoats and cummerbunds provided a touch of colour, and smoking jackets and dressing gowns were often of rich Oriental brocades. This phenomenon was the result of the growing textile manufacturing sector, developing mass production processes, and increasing attempts to market fashion to men. Corsets stressed a woman's sexuality, exaggerating hips and bust by contrast with a tiny waist. Women's evening gowns bared the shoulders and the tops of the breasts. The jersey dresses of the 1880s may have covered the body, but the stretchy novel fabric fit the body like a glove.

Home furnishing was not necessarily ornate or overstuffed. However, those who could afford lavish draperies and expensive ornaments, and wanted to display their wealth, would often do so. Since the Victorian era was one of increased social mobility, there were ever more nouveaux riches making a rich show.

The items used in decoration may also have been darker and heavier than those used today, simply as a matter of practicality. London was noisy and its air was full of soot from countless coal fires. Hence those who could afford it draped their windows in heavy, sound-muffling curtains, and chose colours that didn't show soot quickly. When all washing was done by hand, curtains were not washed as frequently as they might be today.

There is no actual evidence that piano legs were considered scandalous. Pianos and tables were often draped with shawls or cloths—but if the shawls hid anything, it was the cheapness of the furniture. There are references to lower-middle-class families covering up their pine tables rather than show that they couldn't afford mahogany. The piano leg story seems to have originated in the 1839 book, A Diary in America written by Captain Frederick Marryat, as a satirical comment on American prissiness.

Victorian manners may have been as strict as imagined—on the surface. One simply did not speak publicly about sex, childbirth, and such matters, at least in the respectable middle and upper classes. However, as is well known, discretion covered a multitude of sins. Prostitution flourished. Upper-class men and women indulged in adulterous liaisons.

== Gallery ==
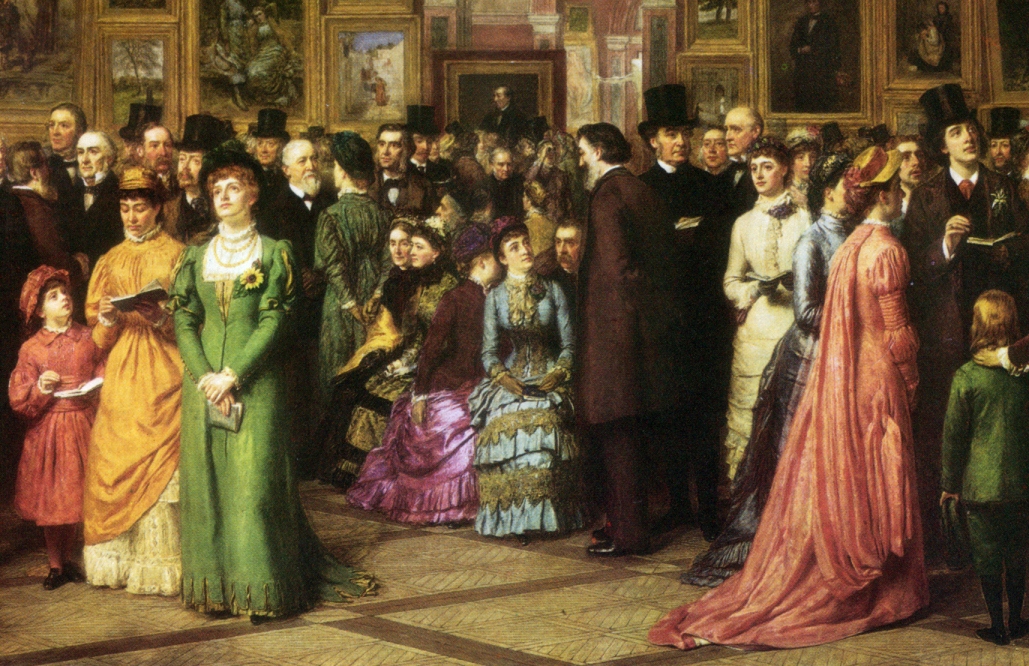
William Powell Frith's painting of 1883 contrasts women's Aesthetic dress (left and right) with fashionable attire (center).

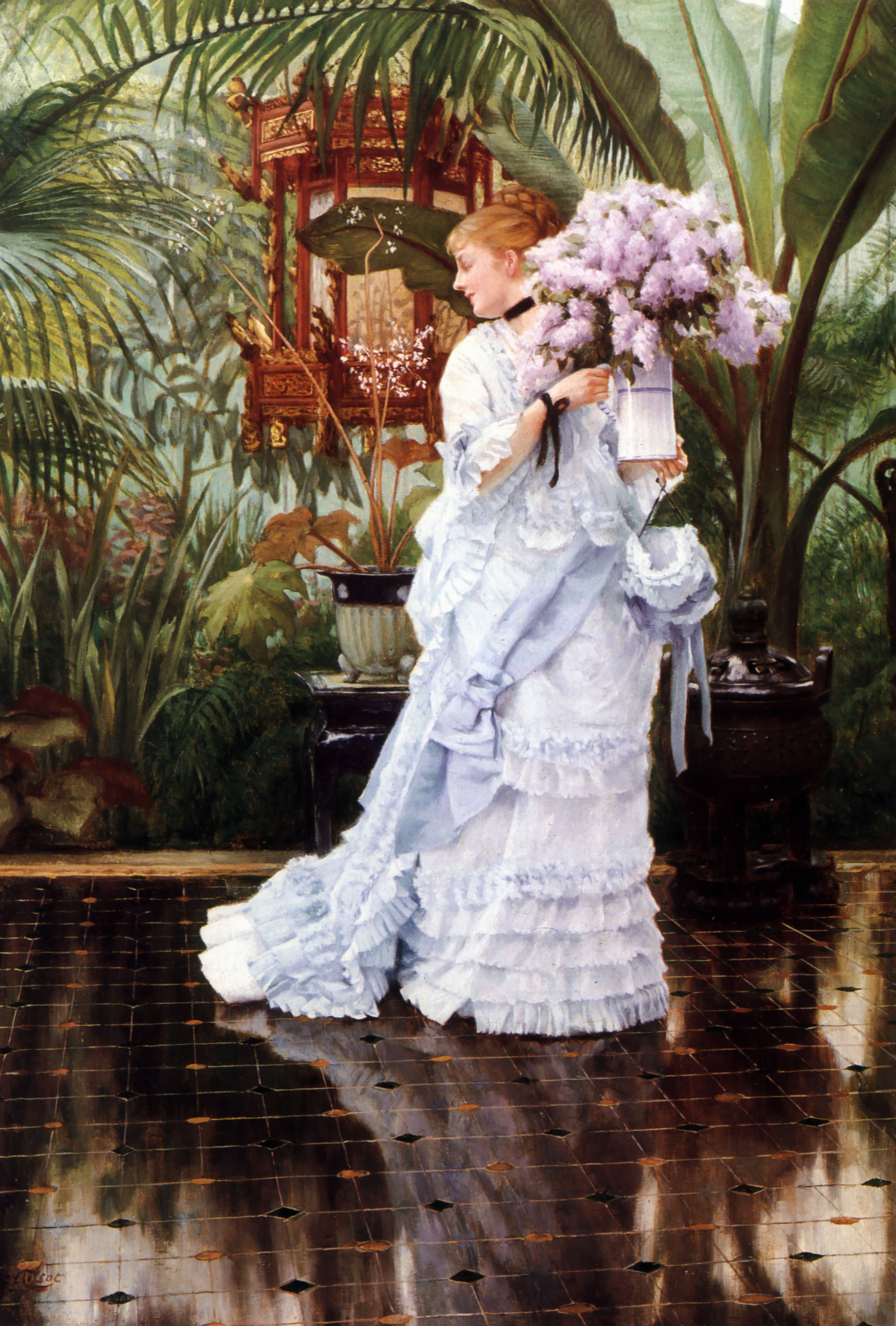
Day dress, c. 1875 James Tissot painting.

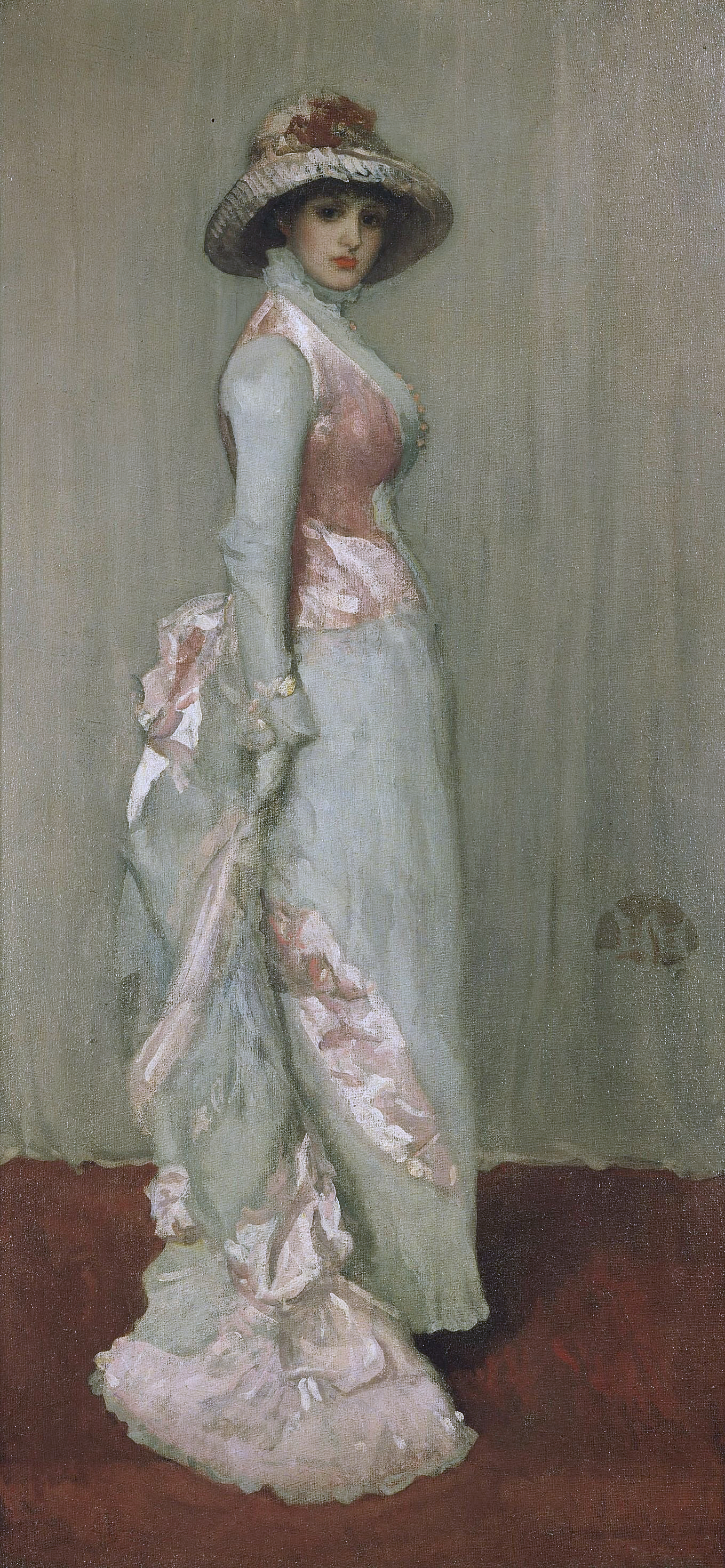

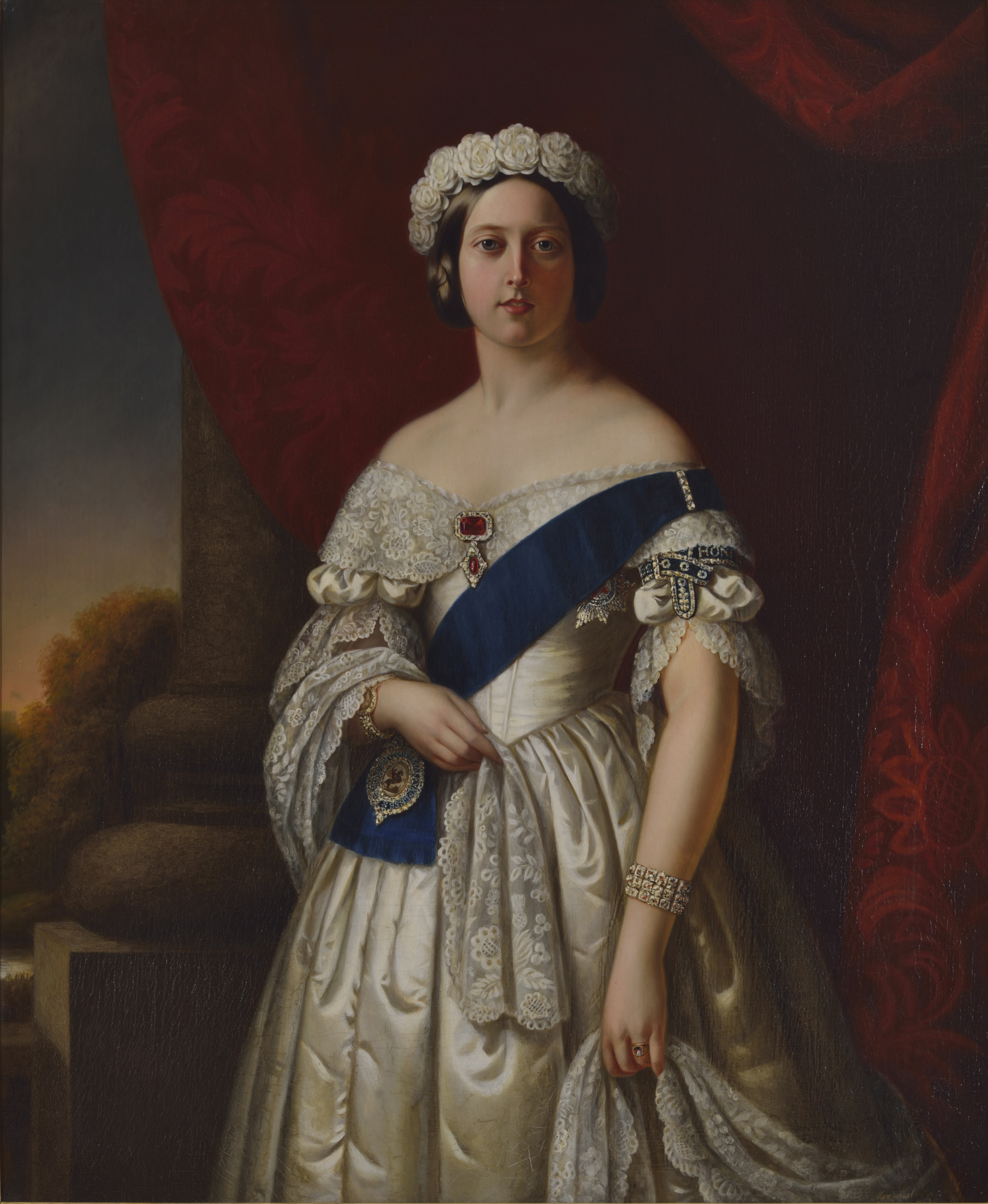
Portrait by Alexander Melville of Queen Victoria, 1845

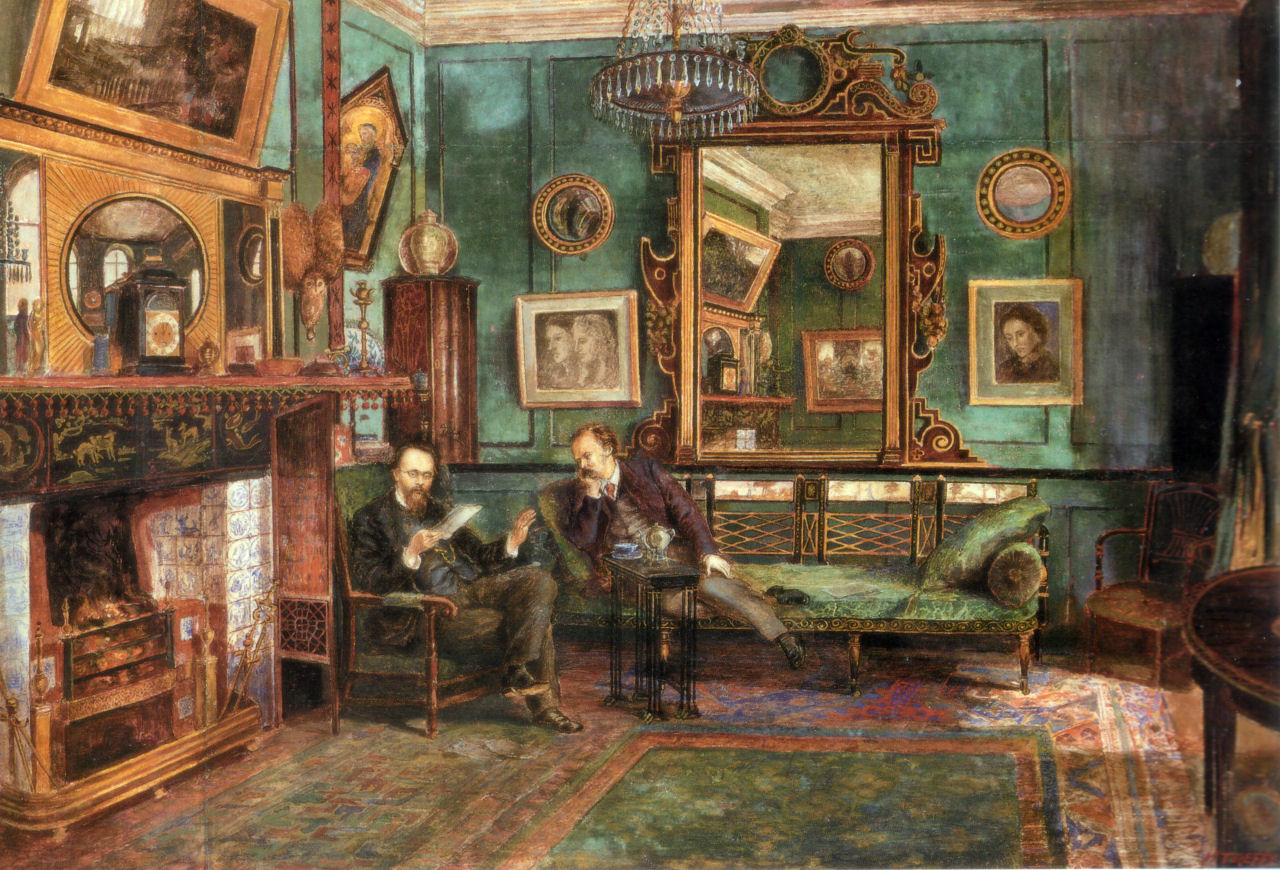
An artistic interior: Dante Gabriel Rossetti reading to Theodore Watts-Dunton in the drawing room at No. 16 Cheyne Walk, 1882

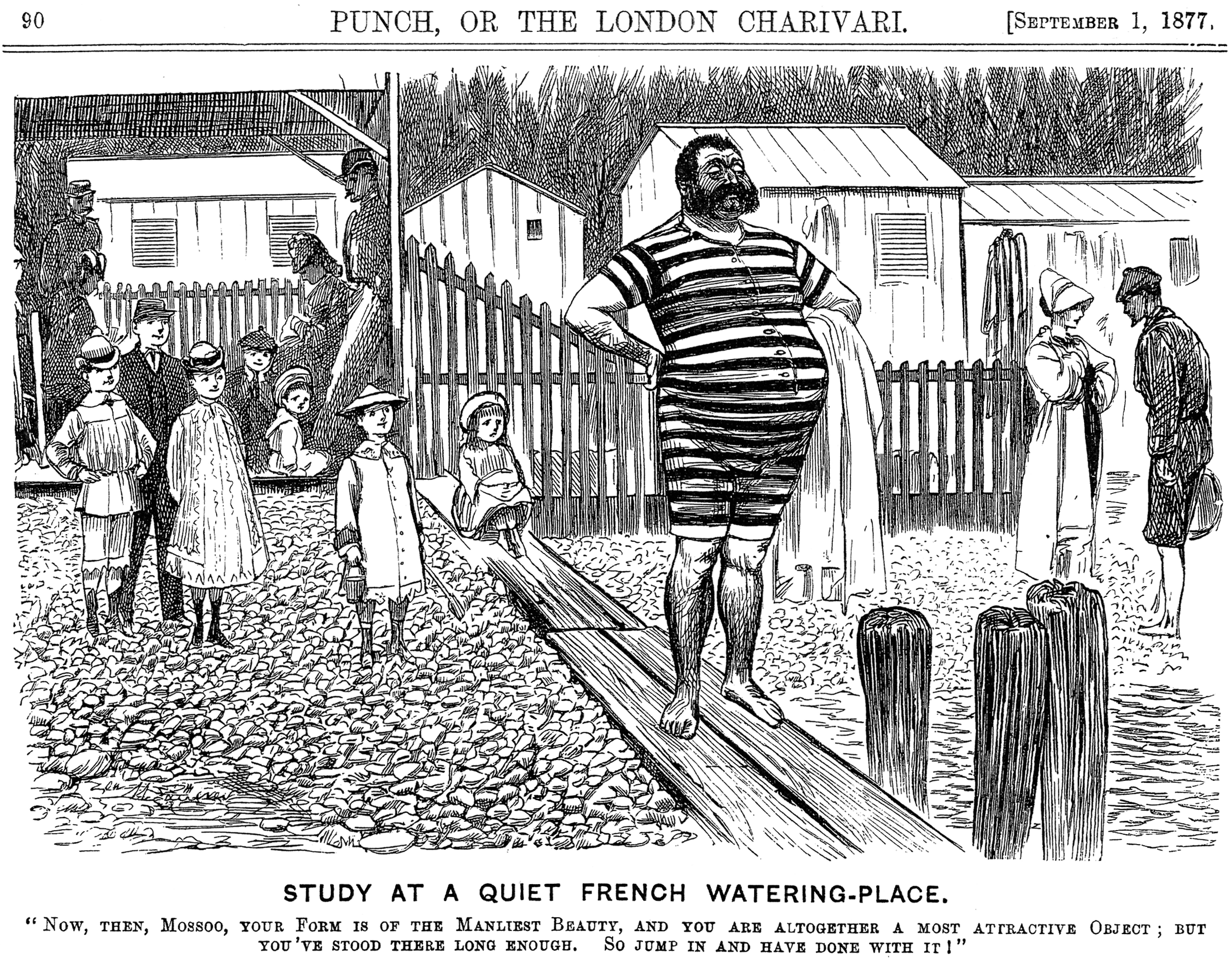
Men's swimwear: Cartoon from Punch by George du Maurier

== See also ==
- Emily Clapham
- Victorian decorative arts
- Victorian dress reform
- Victorian morality
- Victoriana
- Women in the Victorian Era
- Charles Frederick Worth

=== Time periods ===
- 1830s in fashion
- 1840s in fashion
- 1850s in fashion
- 1860s in fashion
- 1870s in fashion
- 1880s in fashion
- 1890s in fashion

=== Women's clothing ===
- Corset
- Corset controversy
- Tightlacing
- Bloomers
- Bodice

=== Contemporary interpretations ===
- Steampunk
- Neo-Victorian
- Lolita
