= Emily Clapham =

English couturier (1857–1952)

- Born: Emily McVitie; 22 December 1857; Cheltenham, England
- Died: 10 January 1952 (aged 64); Cottingham, England

Emily Clapham (1857–1952) was a dress designer. She is known for clothing she created during the Victorian and Edwardian eras.

Clapham, née McVitie, was born on 22 December 1857 in Cheltenham, England. In 1886 she married Haigh Clapham (1854–1950). The following year the couple opened a dressmaking shop in Hull. She began referring to herself as "Madame Clapham".

In the late 1800s amid complaints from workers about long hours and few breaks, she was fined for violating the Factory Acts. Her dressmaking was in high demand and by 1914 the shop employed around 150 workers, most of whom were women. During the period of her greatest popularity, high society clothing was informed by the strict rules for Victorian and Edwardian dress. The best known of her clients was Queen Maud of Norway.

Clapham's popularity waned with the change in style of dressing after World War I and suffered further with rationing during World War II.

Clapham died on 10 January 1952 in Cottingham, England. Her shop remained open after her death and was run by her niece Emily Wall. It eventually closed in 1967.

She is the subject of the book and exhibition Madame Clapham : Hull's celebrated dressmaker.
